= National Register of Historic Places listings in Coventry, Rhode Island =

List of Registered Historic Places in Coventry, Rhode Island, which has been transferred from and is an integral part of National Register of Historic Places listings in Kent County, Rhode Island

Contents: Counties in Rhode Island

Bristol | Kent | Newport | Providence | Washington

This National Park Service list is complete through NPS recent listings posted April 3, 2026.

	Name on the Register	Image	Date listed	Location	City or town	Description
1	Anthony Village Historic District	Anthony Village Historic District	September 20, 2010 (#10000770)	Washington St. between Battey Ave. and Hazard St. and various properties on 12 adjacent streets and the Pawtuxet River; 41°41′39″N 71°33′13″W	Coventry	
2	Arkwright Bridge	Arkwright Bridge	December 12, 1978 (#78000061)	Crosses the Pawtuxet River at Hill St.; closed. 41°43′49″N 71°32′49″W	Coventry	Extends into Providence County
3	Isaac Bowen House	Isaac Bowen House	June 27, 1980 (#80000076)	Northeast of Coventry on Maple Valley Rd. 41°43′09″N 71°41′53″W	Coventry	
4	Joseph Briggs House-Coventry Town Farm	Joseph Briggs House-Coventry Town Farm	June 18, 1987 (#87000997)	Town Farm Rd. 41°42′30″N 71°36′55″W	Coventry	
5	Carbuncle Hill Archaeological District, RI-1072-1079		September 28, 1985 (#85002692)	Address Restricted	Coventry	
6	Christopher Rhodes Greene House	Christopher Rhodes Greene House	August 30, 2007 (#07000891)	2 Potter Court; 41°43′49″N 71°32′25″W	Coventry	
7	Gen. Nathanael Greene Homestead	Gen. Nathanael Greene Homestead	October 7, 1971 (#71000014)	20 Taft St. 41°41′38″N 71°32′36″W	Coventry	
8	Harris Mill	Harris Mill	July 27, 2007 (#07000761)	618 Main St. 41°43′29″N 71°32′11″W	Coventry	
9	Hopkins Hollow Village	Hopkins Hollow Village	January 27, 2010 (#09001290)	Hopkins Hollow Rd., Narrow Ln., and Perry Hill Rd. 41°40′59″N 71°45′06″W	Coventry and West Greenwich	
10	Interlaken Mill Bridge	Interlaken Mill Bridge	December 22, 1978 (#78000064)	Spans the Pawtuxet River at Arkwright; 41°43′41″N 71°32′39″W	Coventry	
11	Moosup River Site (RI-1153)		December 10, 1987 (#87002083)	Address Restricted	Coventry	
12	Paine House	Paine House	May 1, 1974 (#74000039)	Station St. 41°41′29″N 71°33′54″W	Coventry	
13	Pawtuxet Valley Dyeing Company	Pawtuxet Valley Dyeing Company	November 16, 2005 (#05001296)	9 Howard Ave. 41°43′25″N 71°32′17″W	Coventry	
14	Read School	Read School	March 20, 2002 (#02000231)	1670 Flat River Rd. 41°42′20″N 71°35′50″W	Coventry	
15	Rice City Historic District	Rice City Historic District	June 9, 1980 (#80000078)	West of Coventry Center at RI 14 and RI 117; 41°42′37″N 71°45′52″W	Coventry	
16	South Main Street Historic District	South Main Street Historic District	July 10, 1987 (#87001064)	Cady, S. Main, and Wood Sts. 41°41′17″N 71°34′03″W	Coventry	
17	Waterman Tavern	Waterman Tavern	July 24, 1974 (#74000040)	283 Maple Valley Rd. 41°43′10″N 71°39′37″W	Coventry	
18	William Waterman House	William Waterman House	November 14, 1980 (#80000080)	RI 102; 41°42′13″N 71°41′51″W	Coventry	
19	Wilson-Winslow House	Wilson-Winslow House	November 4, 1993 (#93001182)	2414 Harkney Hill Rd. 41°41′09″N 71°40′45″W	Coventry	

== See also ==
- National Register of Historic Places listings in Kent County, Rhode Island
- List of National Historic Landmarks in Rhode Island
