= Kent County, Rhode Island =

County in Rhode Island, United States

Kent County
- County
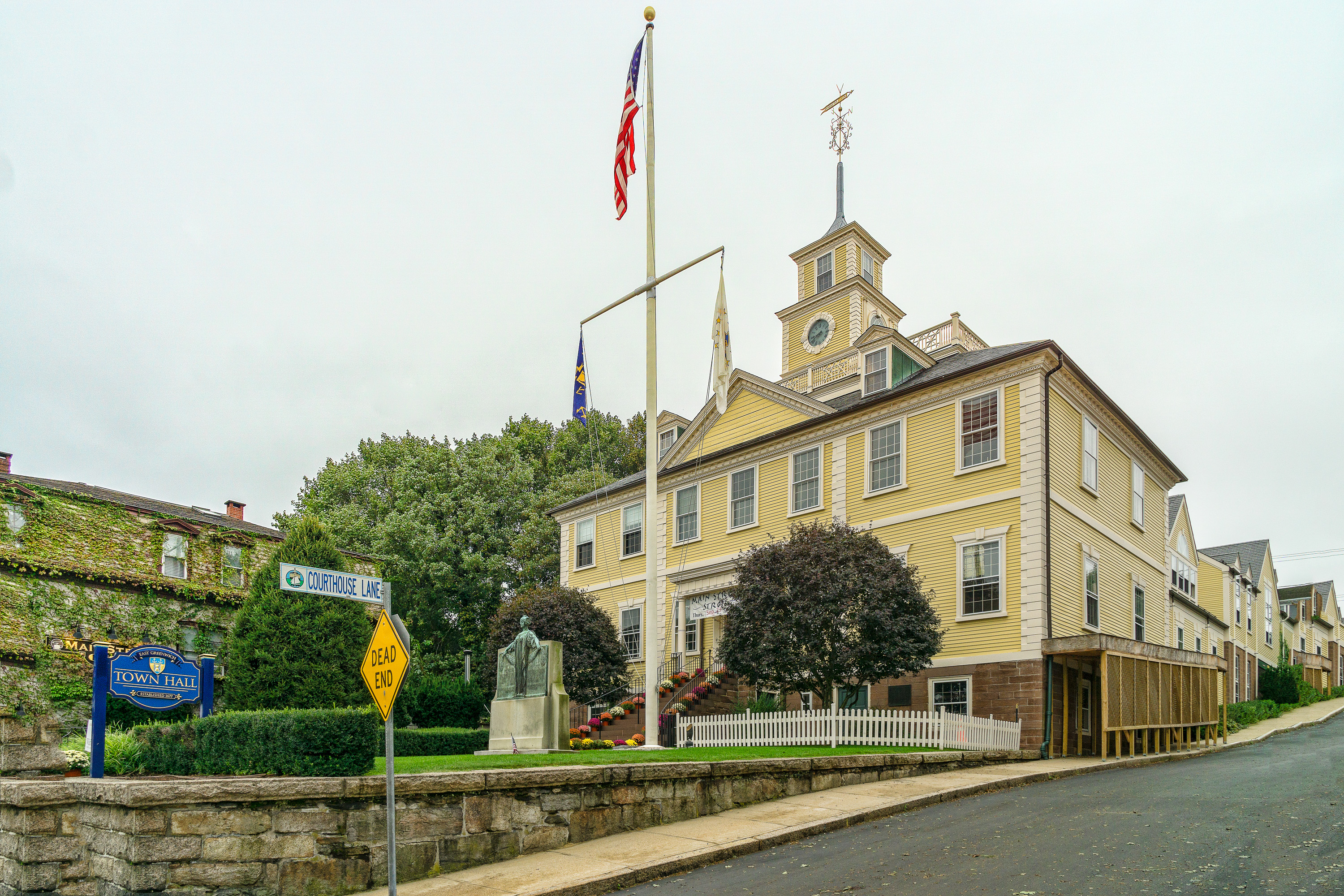
- The East Greenwich Town Hall historically served as the Kent County Courthouse
- Interactive map of Kent County
- Coordinates: 41.68°N 71.58°W
- Country: United States
- State: Rhode Island
- Region: New England
- Metro area: Providence
- Formed: June 11, 1750; 276 years ago
- Named for: Kent, England
- County town: East Greenwich
- Largest city: Warwick
- Incorporated municipalities: 5 (total): 1 city, 4 towns

Area
  - Total: 188 sq mi (490 km^{2})
  - Land: 169 sq mi (440 km^{2})
  - Water: 20 sq mi (52 km^{2}) 10%
- Highest elevation: 629 ft (192 m)
- Lowest elevation: 0 ft (0 m)

Population (April 1, 2020)
  - Total: 170,363
  - Estimate (2025): 173,495 ▲
  - Density: 910/sq mi (350/km^{2})

GDP
  - Total: $11.417 billion (2022)
- Time zone: UTC−5 (EST)
  - Summer (DST): UTC−4 (EDT)
- ZIP Code format: 028xx
- Area code: 401
- FIPS code: 44-003
- GNIS feature ID: 1219778
- Congressional district: 2nd

Kent County is a county located in the U.S. state of Rhode Island. As of the 2020 census, the population was 170,363, making it the second-most populous county in Rhode Island. The county was formed in 1750 from the southern third of Providence County. It was named after the county of Kent, England. Kent County, like other counties in Rhode Island, no longer has governmental functions (other than as court administrative and sheriff corrections boundaries). Its seat is East Greenwich. Kent County is included in the Providence metropolitan area, which in turn constitutes a portion of Greater Boston.

== Geography ==
According to the U.S. Census Bureau, the county has a total area of 188 square miles (490 km^{2}), of which 169 square miles (440 km^{2}) is land and 20 square miles (52 km^{2}) (10%) is water.

=== Adjacent counties ===
- Providence County - north
- Bristol County - east
- Washington County - south
- New London County, Connecticut - southwest
- Windham County, Connecticut - west
- Newport County - southeast

=== Major highways ===
- I-95
- I-295
- US 1
- US 1A
- Route 2
- Route 3
- Route 4
- Route 5
- Route 14
- Route 33
- Route 37
- Route 51
- Route 102
- Route 113
- Route 115
- Route 116
- Route 117
- Route 117A
- Route 118
- Route 401
- Route 402
- Route 403

== Demographics ==
Historical population
Census	Pop.	Note	%±
1790	8,851		—
1800	8,487		−4.1%
1810	9,834		15.9%
1820	10,228		4.0%
1830	12,789		25.0%
1840	13,083		2.3%
1850	15,068		15.2%
1860	17,303		14.8%
1870	18,595		7.5%
1880	20,588		10.7%
1890	26,754		29.9%
1900	29,976		12.0%
1910	36,378		21.4%
1920	38,269		5.2%
1930	51,390		34.3%
1940	58,311		13.5%
1950	77,763		33.4%
1960	112,619		44.8%
1970	142,382		26.4%
1980	154,163		8.3%
1990	161,135		4.5%
2000	167,090		3.7%
2010	166,158		−0.6%
2020	170,363		2.5%
2025 (est.)	173,495	▲	1.8%
U.S. Decennial Census; 1790-1960 1900-1990; 1990-2000 2010-2019

=== 2020 census ===
As of the 2020 census, the county had a population of 170,363. Of the residents, 18.3% were under the age of 18 and 20.2% were 65 years of age or older; the median age was 44.6 years. For every 100 females there were 94.2 males, and for every 100 females age 18 and over there were 91.7 males. 92.8% of residents lived in urban areas and 7.2% lived in rural areas.

The racial makeup of the county was 86.3% White, 1.9% Black or African American, 0.3% American Indian and Alaska Native, 2.9% Asian, 2.3% from some other race, and 6.3% from two or more races. Hispanic or Latino residents of any race comprised 5.7% of the population.

There were 72,063 households in the county, of which 25.2% had children under the age of 18 living with them and 28.3% had a female householder with no spouse or partner present. About 31.1% of all households were made up of individuals and 14.0% had someone living alone who was 65 years of age or older.

There were 76,084 housing units, of which 5.3% were vacant. Among occupied housing units, 70.1% were owner-occupied and 29.9% were renter-occupied. The homeowner vacancy rate was 1.1% and the rental vacancy rate was 4.7%.

Kent County, Rhode Island – Racial and ethnic composition Note: the US Census treats Hispanic/Latino as an ethnic category. This table excludes Latinos from the racial categories and assigns them to a separate category. Hispanics/Latinos may be of any race.
Race / Ethnicity (NH = Non-Hispanic)	Pop 2000	Pop 2010	Pop 2020	% 2000	% 2010	% 2020
White alone (NH)	158,086	152,141	144,761	94.61%	91.56%	84.97%
Black or African American alone (NH)	1,451	2,157	2,889	0.86%	1.29%	1.69%
Native American or Alaska Native alone (NH)	335	355	364	0.20%	0.21%	0.21%
Asian alone (NH)	2,220	3,346	4,830	1.32%	2.01%	2.83%
Pacific Islander alone (NH)	27	29	32	0.01%	0.01%	0.01%
Other race alone (NH)	222	277	767	0.13%	0.16%	0.45%
Mixed race or Multiracial (NH)	1,922	2,544	7,055	1.15%	1.53%	4.14%
Hispanic or Latino (any race)	2,827	5,309	9,665	1.69%	3.19%	5.67%
Total	167,090	166,158	170,363	100.00%	100.00%	100.00%

=== 2010 census ===
As of the 2010 United States census, there were 166,158 people, 68,645 households, and 43,747 families living in the county. The population density was 985.9 inhabitants per square mile (380.7/km^{2}). There were 73,701 housing units at an average density of 437.3 per square mile (168.8/km^{2}). The racial makeup of the county was 93.4% white, 2.0% Asian, 1.4% black or African American, 0.3% American Indian, 1.0% from other races, and 1.8% from two or more races. Those of Hispanic or Latino origin made up 3.2% of the population. The largest ancestry groups were:

(Republic of Ireland) 26.7% Irish

(Italy) 23.2% Italian

(England) 17.3% English

(France) 16.3% French

(Portugal) 8.9% Portuguese

(Germany) 7.6% German

(Poland) 4.8% Polish

(Canada) 4.4% French Canadian

(United States) 3.3% American

(Sweden) 2.9% Swedish

(Scotland) 2.4% Scottish

(Northern Ireland) 1.7% Scotch-Irish

(Russia) 1.4% Russian

Of the 68,645 households, 28.7% had children under the age of 18 living with them, 48.1% were married couples living together, 11.1% had a female householder with no husband present, 36.3% were non-families, and 29.2% of all households were made up of individuals. The average household size was 2.40 and the average family size was 2.98. The median age was 42.7 years.

The median income for a household in the county was $61,088 and the median income for a family was $77,100. Males had a median income of $53,458 versus $41,380 for females. The per capita income for the county was $31,221. About 4.9% of families and 7.9% of the population were below the poverty line, including 9.5% of those under age 18 and 8.6% of those age 65 or over.

=== 2000 census ===
As of the census of 2000, there were 167,090 people, 67,320 households, and 44,969 families living in the county. The population density was 982 inhabitants per square mile (379/km^{2}). There were 70,365 housing units at an average density of 414 per square mile (160/km^{2}). The racial makeup of the county was 95.54% White, 0.93% Black or African American, 0.23% Native American, 1.34% Asian, 0.02% Pacific Islander, 0.65% from other races, and 1.28% from two or more races. 1.69% of the population were Hispanic or Latino of any race. 20.1% were of Italian, 18.9% Irish, 11.1% English, 10.1% French, 6.1% French Canadian and 6.1% Portuguese ancestry, 92.0% spoke English, 1.9% Spanish, 1.5% French, 1.4% Portuguese and 1.1% Italian as their first language.

There were 67,320 households, out of which 29.90% had children under the age of 18 living with them, 52.70% were married couples living together, 10.50% had a female householder with no husband present, and 33.20% were non-families. 27.60% of all households were made up of individuals, and 11.40% had someone living alone who was 65 years of age or older. The average household size was 2.45 and the average family size was 3.02.

In the county, the population was spread out, with 23.20% under the age of 18, 7.00% from 18 to 24, 30.50% from 25 to 44, 24.20% from 45 to 64, and 15.10% who were 65 years of age or older. The median age was 39 years. For every 100 females, there were 92.30 males. For every 100 females age 18 and over, there were 88.70 males.

The median income for a household in the county was $47,617, and the median income for a family was $57,491. Males had a median income of $40,052 versus $29,130 for females. The per capita income for the county was $23,833. About 4.80% of families and 6.60% of the population were below the poverty line, including 7.90% of those under age 18 and 8.10% of those age 65 or over.

== Communities ==
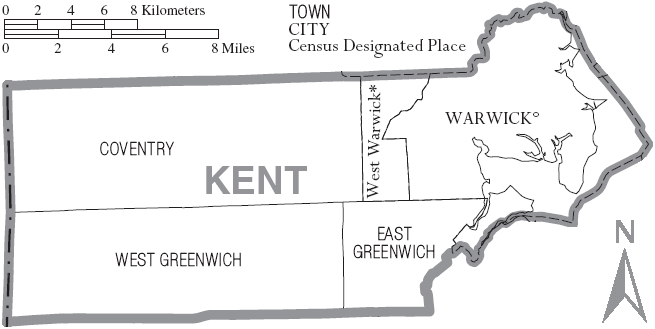
Map of Kent County, Rhode Island showing cities, towns, and CDPs

=== City ===
- Warwick

=== Towns ===
- Coventry
- East Greenwich (traditional county seat)
- West Greenwich
- West Warwick

=== Census-designated place ===
- Greene

=== Other villages ===
- Anthony
- Arkwright
- Blackrock
- Coventry Centre
- Crompton
- Fairbanks
- Harris
- Hillsgrove
- Hopkins Hollow
- Nooseneck
- Lippitt
- Quidnick
- Spring Lake
- Summit
- Tiogue
- Washington
- Whaley's Hollow

== Politics ==
United States presidential election results for Kent County, Rhode Island
Year	Republican		Democratic		Third party(ies)	
Year	No.	%	No.	%	No.	%
1880	1,759	59.99%	1,153	39.32%	20	0.68%
1884	1,602	62.17%	886	34.38%	89	3.45%
1888	1,988	59.99%	1,261	38.05%	65	1.96%
1892	2,244	58.81%	1,469	38.50%	103	2.70%
1896	2,817	77.37%	645	17.71%	179	4.92%
1900	2,613	66.19%	1,126	28.52%	209	5.29%
1904	2,981	60.30%	1,859	37.60%	104	2.10%
1908	3,617	65.42%	1,700	30.75%	212	3.83%
1912	2,170	38.90%	2,030	36.39%	1,379	24.72%
1916	4,038	59.39%	2,632	38.71%	129	1.90%
1920	8,474	69.98%	3,394	28.03%	242	2.00%
1924	11,100	65.84%	5,429	32.20%	331	1.96%
1928	11,487	60.44%	7,460	39.25%	58	0.31%
1932	11,096	50.95%	10,398	47.74%	286	1.31%
1936	13,550	48.36%	13,238	47.25%	1,231	4.39%
1940	14,790	50.74%	14,333	49.17%	28	0.10%
1944	13,710	49.27%	14,059	50.52%	57	0.20%
1948	16,299	51.28%	15,287	48.10%	199	0.63%
1952	27,745	60.85%	17,824	39.09%	24	0.05%
1956	31,548	65.94%	16,298	34.06%	0	0.00%
1960	24,344	44.26%	30,662	55.74%	0	0.00%
1964	12,297	21.66%	44,476	78.34%	0	0.00%
1968	22,493	37.07%	35,609	58.69%	2,576	4.25%
1972	40,534	58.19%	29,004	41.64%	115	0.17%
1976	34,131	48.61%	35,855	51.07%	227	0.32%
1980	28,331	39.90%	31,350	44.15%	11,324	15.95%
1984	40,427	56.15%	31,352	43.55%	214	0.30%
1988	34,314	47.79%	37,221	51.84%	266	0.37%
1992	25,217	30.59%	35,934	43.60%	21,274	25.81%
1996	19,992	27.95%	41,018	57.35%	10,516	14.70%
2000	25,291	34.42%	43,265	58.89%	4,914	6.69%
2004	33,699	43.19%	42,830	54.90%	1,489	1.91%
2008	33,780	40.18%	48,406	57.58%	1,888	2.25%
2012	31,567	40.00%	45,564	57.73%	1,792	2.27%
2016	38,336	46.72%	37,788	46.05%	5,929	7.23%
2020	42,001	45.12%	49,113	52.76%	1,979	2.13%
2024	44,526	47.80%	46,269	49.67%	2,353	2.53%

Kent County, like most of Rhode Island, has been strongly Democratic for the last half century. In 2016, Donald Trump became the first Republican to win the county since Ronald Reagan in 1984, although Joe Biden was able to bring it back over to the Democratic side four years later in 2020. Kamala Harris retained the county in 2024 for the Democrats, though the margin narrowed by over five points.

Gubernatorial elections results

Gubernatorial elections results
Year	Republican	Democratic	Third parties
2022	44.1% 30,204	52.8% 36,122	3.1% 2,119
2018	44.8% 29,921	44.0% 29,673	11.2% 7,835
2014	38.99% 23,009	34.19% 20,176	26.82% 15,830
2010	36.79% 23,303	19.26% 12,199	43.96% 27,841

United States Senate election results for Kent County, Rhode Island1
Year	Republican		Democratic		Third party(ies)	
Year	No.	%	No.	%	No.	%
2024	41,403	45.68%	49,019	54.09%	207	0.23%
2018	30,749	45.49%	36,704	54.30%	145	0.21%
2012	30,217	40.44%	44,332	59.33%	170	0.23%

United States Senate election results for Kent County, Rhode Island2
Year	Republican		Democratic		Third party(ies)	
Year	No.	%	No.	%	No.	%
2020	35,255	39.12%	54,770	60.77%	100	0.11%
2014	19,663	40.91%	28,320	58.92%	80	0.17%

== See also ==
- National Register of Historic Places listings in Kent County, Rhode Island
