= Greene, Rhode Island =

Census-designated place in Rhode Island, United States

- Census designated place
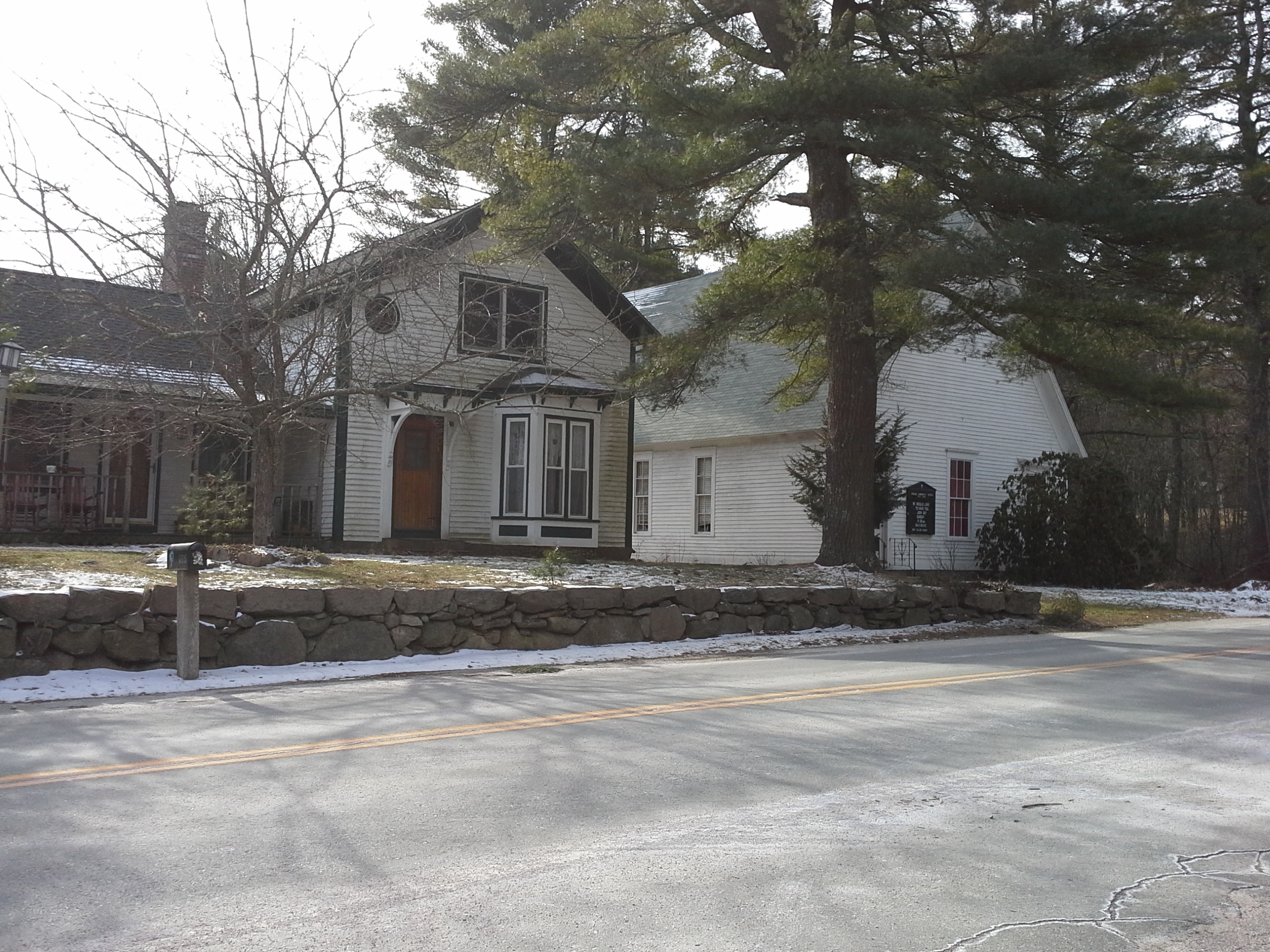
- Greene Community Church and House

- Location in Kent County and the state of Rhode Island
- Coordinates: 41°41′28″N 71°44′45″W
- Country: United States
- State: Rhode Island
- County: Kent
- Town: Coventry

Area
  - Total: 6.09 sq mi (15.78 km^{2})
  - Land: 6.07 sq mi (15.73 km^{2})
  - Water: 0.015 sq mi (0.04 km^{2})
- Elevation: 558 ft (170 m)

Population (2020)
  - Total: 914
  - Density: 150/sq mi (58.1/km^{2})
- Time zone: UTC−5 (Eastern)
  - Summer (DST): UTC−4 (Eastern)
- ZIP Code: 02827
- Area code: 401
- FIPS code: 44-31240
- GNIS feature ID: 1219521

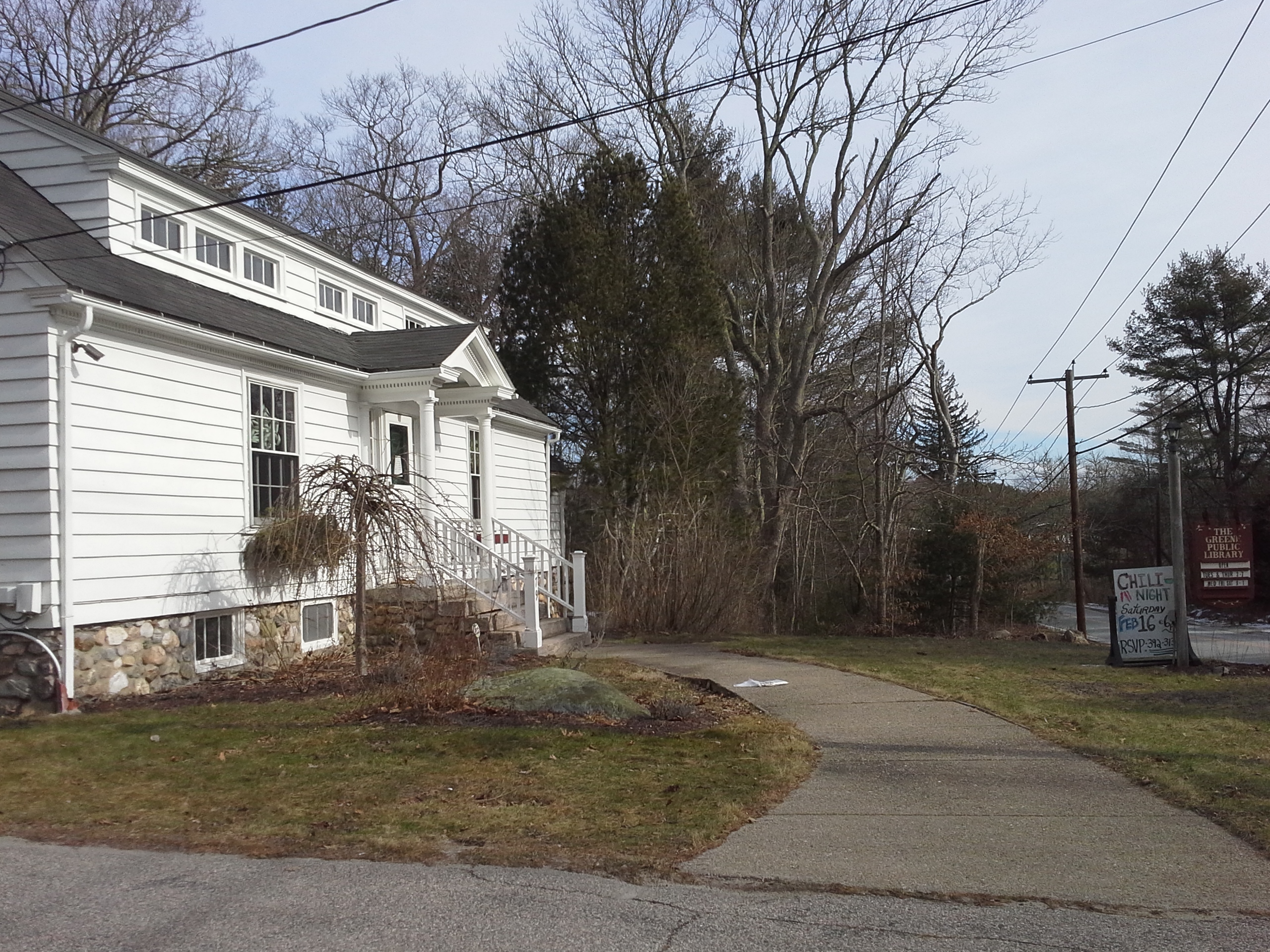
Greene Public Library

Greene is an unincorporated village and census-designated place in the western part of the town of Coventry, Rhode Island. As of the 2010 census, it had a population of 888. It is 2 miles (3 km) east of the Connecticut border and the same distance north of West Greenwich, Rhode Island. It is named in honor of Nathanael Greene, a Rhode Island-born general in the American Revolution who led the American forces in the Southern Theater of the war and helped turn the tide toward America's victory.

== History ==
Until 1854, Greene was a swamp with a cart path running through it. The path connected Hopkins Hollow to the south and Rice City to the north. The railroad came to the area in the early 1850s, and the original train stop was known as "Coffin Station" because Coffin Road was the nearest road. In 1856, railroad officials renamed the station "Greene" after Revolutionary War hero Nathanael Greene. The railroad wanted to build a depot where local farmers could sell their produce to the trains heading towards Providence, Rhode Island and Hartford, Connecticut, and the Greene depot became an important station in western Rhode Island. Every morning, farmers would bring their produce to sell to the 7:25 milk train going to Providence.

As the station grew in importance, a village grew up around it, shipping large amounts of milk, wood, and cranberries via train. Eventually, a school, church, library, and meeting hall were built, as well as a religious campground where the Advent Christian Church held annual camp meetings starting in 1880. The religious campground became important in Rhode Island, where camp meetings were held throughout the summer. The railroad would add on extra cars to their trains during the summer months, and up to 10,000 people would attend. After the beginning of the 20th century, the camp meeting declined and ended decades later.

The railroad's importance declined greatly in the 20th century with the advent of the automobile, and the depot closed in 1969. Today, Greene is a shadow of what it once was. However, the village is mostly intact, with most of the buildings dating from the late 19th century.

== Geography ==
The Greene census-designated place includes the communities of Greene, Fairbanks Corner, Rice City and Summit. Rhode Island Route 14 runs along the northern edge of the CDP through Fairbanks Corner, and leads northeast 23 miles (37 km) to Providence and west 7 miles (11 km) to Moosup, Connecticut. Rhode Island Route 117 passes through the center of the CDP, from Fairbanks Corner through Greene village, and over to Summit, eventually leading 16 miles (26 km) to Apponaug in the city of Warwick. Rhode Island Route 102 forms the eastern border of the CDP; it leads north 7 miles (11 km) to Clayville in the town of Scituate and south the same distance to Interstate 95 in the town of West Greenwich.

The Coventry Greenway, part of the East Coast Greenway running from Maine to Florida, is a rail trail that runs through the community on the route of the old New York, New Haven and Hartford Railroad.

According to the U.S. Census Bureau, the Greene CDP has a total area of 6.1 square miles (15.8 km^{2}), of which 0.02 square miles (0.04 km^{2}), or 0.28%, are water. The community is drained by the Moosup River, which flows west to the Quinebaug River in Connecticut.

== Demographics ==
Historical population
Census	Pop.	Note	%±
2020	914		—
U.S. Decennial Census

=== 2020 census ===
The 2020 United States census counted 914 people, 325 households, and 273 families in Greene. The population density was 150.5 per square mile (58.1/km^{2}). There were 336 housing units at an average density of 55.3 per square mile (21.4/km^{2}). The racial makeup was 93.11% (851) white or European American (92.23% non-Hispanic white), 0.66% (6) black or African-American, 0.0% (0) Native American or Alaska Native, 0.98% (9) Asian, 0.22% (2) Pacific Islander or Native Hawaiian, 0.11% (1) from other races, and 4.92% (45) from two or more races. Hispanic or Latino of any race was 2.63% (24) of the population.

Of the 325 households, 31.4% had children under the age of 18; 64.0% were married couples living together; 15.4% had a female householder with no spouse or partner present. 14.2% of households consisted of individuals and 8.6% had someone living alone who was 65 years of age or older. The average household size was 3.0 and the average family size was 3.2. The percent of those with a bachelor's degree or higher was estimated to be 27.6% of the population.

22.3% of the population was under the age of 18, 6.9% from 18 to 24, 22.9% from 25 to 44, 31.1% from 45 to 64, and 16.8% who were 65 years of age or older. The median age was 43.3 years. For every 100 females, the population had 94.5 males. For every 100 females ages 18 and older, there were 96.1 males.

The 2016–2020 5-year American Community Survey estimates show that the median household income was $83,200 (with a margin of error of +/- $12,321) and the median family income was $83,850 (+/- $13,654). Males had a median income of $55,660 (+/- $5,067) versus $29,844 (+/- $16,770) for females. The median income for those above 16 years old was $41,607 (+/- $10,403). Approximately, 0.0% of families and 3.3% of the population were below the poverty line, including 0.0% of those under the age of 18 and 4.1% of those ages 65 or over.
