= Blackrock, Rhode Island =

Coordinates: 41°43′0″N 71°32′37″W

Blackrock
- Village
- Interactive map of Blackrock
- Country: United States
- State: Rhode Island
- County: Kent County

Population
  - Total: 40

Blackrock is a village in Kent County, Rhode Island, United States, located in the town of Coventry between the villages of Anthony and Arkwright.

The area was named after a large dark rock which was rumored to be the site of Native American marriage ceremonies. The rock is located on Blackrock Road. The village of 40 people was founded in 1814 when William Greene first sold a parcel of his land to the Black Rock Cotton Manufacturing Company for the initial construction of a dam on the Black Rock Brook which flows from Black Rock Pond. The dam provided power for a mill. Nicholas Potter bought the mill in 1824 and converted it into a machine shop and later a broom factory. Samuel Greene was a prominent teacher in the area. With expansion, the village of Blackrock is now largely a continuation of the village of Anthony. There is an elementary school named after the Black Rock.
