= Pawtuxet Valley =

Pawtuxet Valley may be:

- Pawtuxet Valley Dyeing Company
- Pawtuxet Valley Railroad
- Pawtuxet River Valley
