= Tiogue =

Village in Coventry, Rhode Island, USA

Coordinates: 41.674°N 71.555°W

Tiogue, (Note: Pronounced /taɪˈoʊk, -ˈoʊɡ/ ty-OHK, -OHG) previously named Barclay and Pleasant Vale, is a village in Coventry, Rhode Island near the village of Washington.

Fones Potter (1759-1833), an American Revolution veteran, started a textile mill in the area, which was originally named Pleasant Vale. The Potters named it "Barclay" after the eighteenth-century Scottish Quaker Minister and Writer, Robert Barclay. Potter sold the mill and water rights to Jabez Anthony and Perez Peck who founded the Rope Walk, a manufacturer of anchor rope, twine, and cotton banding and built a long rope twisting building on a stream flowing from the Tiogue Reservoir in the area bordered by Holmes Road, Lydia Road, York Drive, and Arnold Road. Anthony's son and grandson continued the business after his death. By the late nineteenth century the mill closed and a summer colony developed around Lake Tiogue, which has largely altered the village and the only two nineteenth century buildings that remain are the William H. Anthony House located on Holmes Road and the Samuel Tarbox House located on Arnold Road.
