= Quidnick, Rhode Island =

Village in Coventry, Rhode Island, U.S.

Coordinates: 41°41′47″N 71°32′13″W

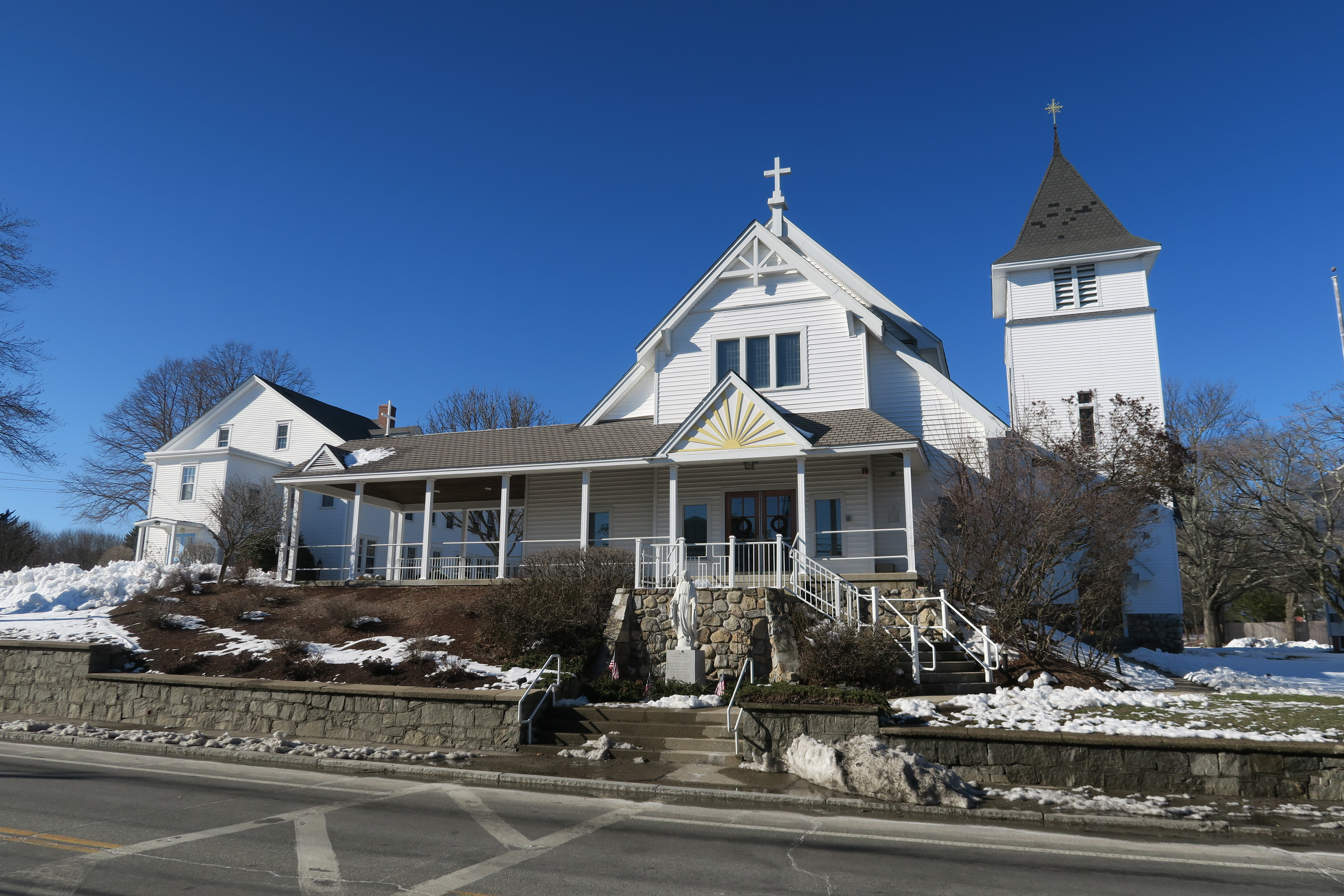
Our Lady of Czestochowa

Quidnick is a village within the town of Coventry, Rhode Island.

Before the American Revolution the area where Anthony and Quidnick are today was originally named Greeneville for the Greene Family who had operated an iron forge in the mid-18th century. By 1811 the village was renamed Taftville for Stephen Taft a local cotton manufacturer. After the Sprague family acquired the village in 1840, they changed the name to Quidnick, which is a Native American word meaning “at the end of the hill.” The current Quidnick Mill Complex was constructed in 1848.
