= Spring Lake, Rhode Island =

Village in Coventry, Rhode Island, U.S.

Coordinates: 41°40′47″N 71°34′33″W

Spring Lake is a village in the town of Coventry, Rhode Island.

The Johnson family were early owners of the land in the area and, in 1818, sold the property to Ezra Ramsdell to build a warp thread mill along the Mishnock River. Mill housing was constructed along the highway from Washington Village to the Maple Root Meeting House. After the mill burned in 1830, Christopher A. Whitman acquired the land and constructed another called Whitmans’ Yard, which produced shirting material.

In 1852, Whitman leased the complex to Pardon Olney; it operated for another 30 years. In 1865, the Peckham family bought the mill, and ran it until it burned around 1907. Today, the area is settled with private businesses.
