= Fairbanks, Rhode Island =

Village in Rhode Island, US

Coordinates: 41°42′28″N 71°45′24″W

Fairbanks (also known as Fairbanks Corner) is a village in the town of Coventry, Rhode Island on Route 14, Plainfield Pike, right after the village of Rice City and near the Connecticut border.

In the 1783 Colonel John McGregor, a Revolutionary War veteran, opened a tavern on the Plainfield Pike in the area, and in 1831 the tavern became associated with the Temperance Movement until it burned in the late 1800s. In 1826 George Fairbank from Sudbury, Massachusetts purchased a grist, card and fulling mill on the Moosup River, which was owned by the Blanchard family. Fairbank then constructed a woolen mill on the spot, which eventually utilized wool from local sheep farmers and used local seamstresses. The village was eventually named after Fairbank. Fairbank's House still remains in the village as do the foundations of the McGregor Tavern and the Fairbank Mill along the banks of the Moosup River.
