= Isaac Bowen House =

Historic house in Rhode Island, United States

- U.S. National Register of Historic Places
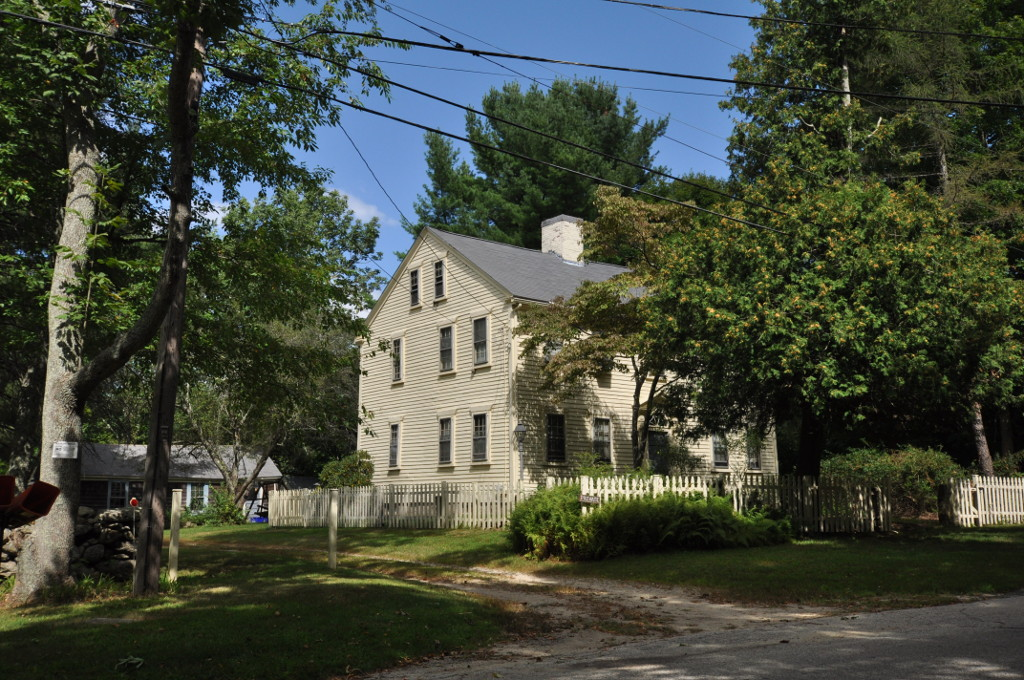

- Location within Rhode Island Location within the United States
- Nearest city: Coventry, Rhode Island
- Coordinates: 41.7167°N 71.699°W
- Area: 83.5 acres (33.8 ha)
- Built: 1750
- NRHP reference No.: 80000076
- Added to NRHP: June 27, 1980

The Isaac Bowen House is an historic house in Coventry, Rhode Island. The 2 1/2-story center-chimney wood-frame house, built c. 1750, stands on Maple Valley Road, near its junction with Rhode Island Route 102. The property, more than 3 acres (1.2 ha) extending to the road junction, is adjacent to the Audubon Society's George B. Parker Woodland Sanctuary, and is also owned by the society. The house was built by Isaac Bowen, a member of the locally prominent Bowen family, and is the only Bowen house to survive from that time. The house now serves as home to the Parker Sanctuary's caretaker.

The house was listed on the National Register of Historic Places in 1980.

== See also ==
- National Register of Historic Places listings in Kent County, Rhode Island
