= Waterman Tavern =

- U.S. National Register of Historic Places
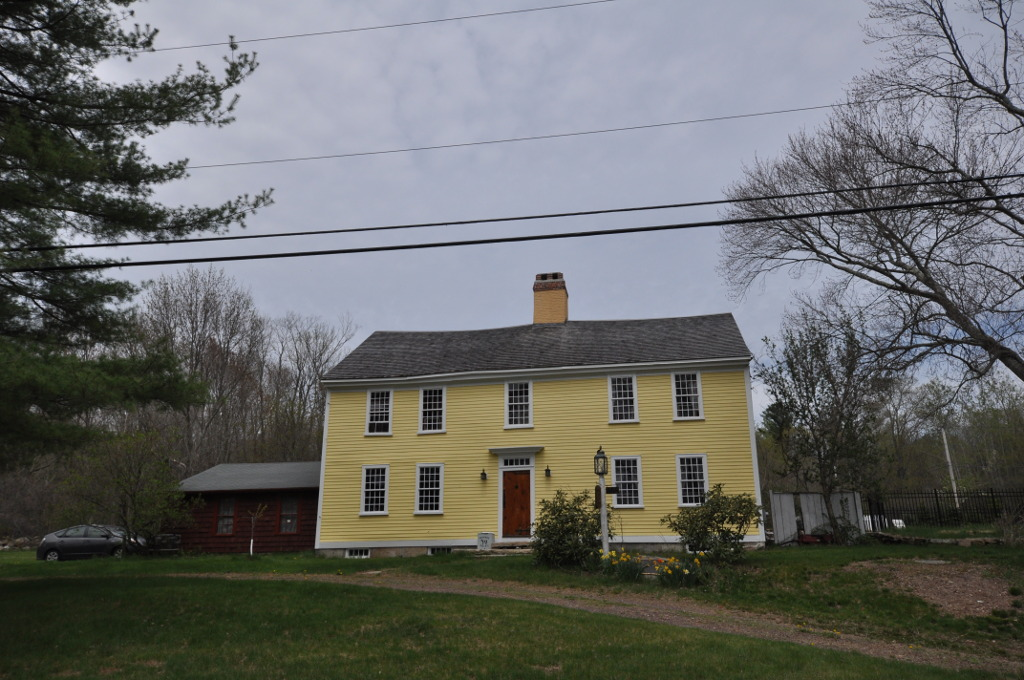

- Location within Rhode Island Location within the United States
- Location: 283 Maple Valley Rd., Coventry, Rhode Island
- Coordinates: 41°43′10″N 71°39′35″W
- Area: 3 acres (1.2 ha)
- Built: 1744
- NRHP reference No.: 74000040
- Added to NRHP: July 24, 1974

The Waterman Tavern is a historic house and tavern at 486 Maple Valley Road, near Whaley's Hollow in Coventry, Rhode Island. The 2 1/2-story wood-frame house was built before 1747 by John Waterman, who was licensed to operate a tavern on the premises in that year. It is five bays wide with a central chimney. The site was advantageously located on the main road between Providence and Plainfield, Connecticut. The tavern was a center of civic discourse, and town meetings were regularly held there until 1835.

The tavern was one of the first stops along the route taken by Count de Rochambeau's army during its 1781 march from Providence to Yorktown, Virginia during the American Revolutionary War. The main army camped near the tavern, while the officers were quartered in the tavern itself.

The building was listed on the National Register of Historic Places in 1974.

== See also ==
- Washington–Rochambeau Revolutionary Route
- List of historic sites preserved along Rochambeau's route
- National Register of Historic Places listings in Kent County, Rhode Island
