= Paine House (Coventry, Rhode Island) =

Historic house in Rhode Island, United States

- U.S. National Register of Historic Places
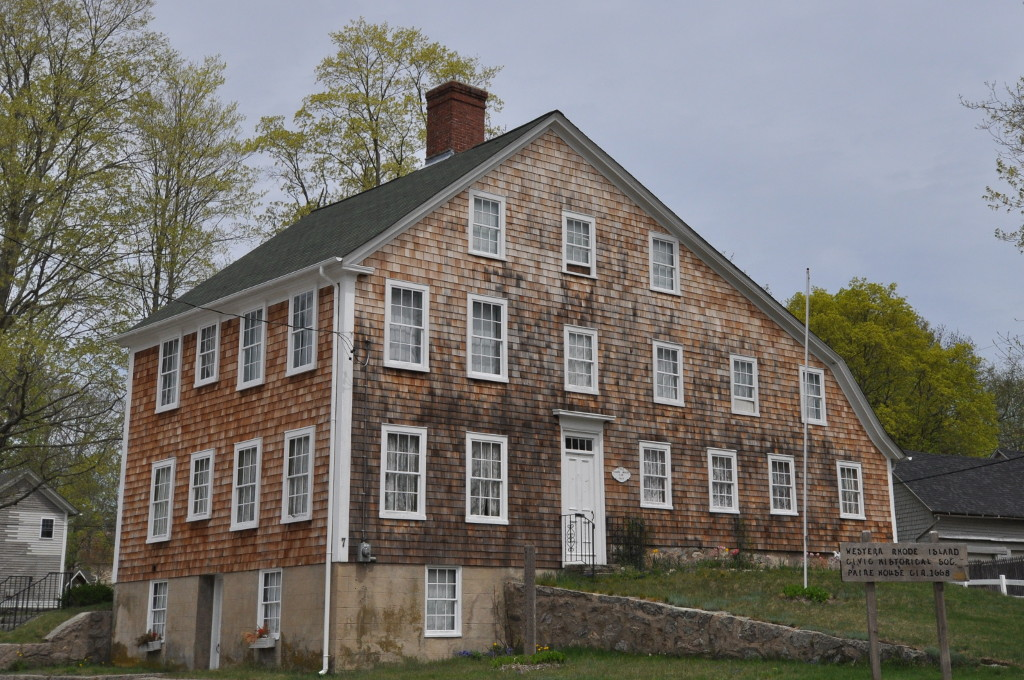

- Location within Rhode Island Location within the United States
- Location: Coventry, Rhode Island
- Coordinates: 41°41′29″N 71°33′54″W
- Built: 1748
- NRHP reference No.: 74000039
- Added to NRHP: May 1, 1974

The Paine House Museum is an historic house at 7 Station Street in the village of Washington in the town Coventry, Rhode Island. The oldest portion of this large 2 1/2-story wood-frame house may have been built as early as 1691 by Samuel Bennett, who was known to operate a sawmill on the nearby Pawtuxet River. The house was significantly enlarged c. 1748 by Francis Brayton. His son, Francis Jr., was granted a license to operate a tavern on the premises in 1785. The property was acquired by the Paine family in 1866, whose descendants gave it to the Western Rhode Island Civic Historical Society in 1953.

The house has been furnished to reflect the Colonial era, and is now operated by the society as a historic house museum. Visitation is from May through September on Saturdays.

The house was listed on the National Register of Historic Places in 1974.

== See also ==
- List of historical societies in Rhode Island
- National Register of Historic Places listings in Kent County, Rhode Island
