= Coventry Centre, Rhode Island =

Village in Coventry, Rhode Island, U.S.

Coordinates: 41.7025°N 71.6351°W

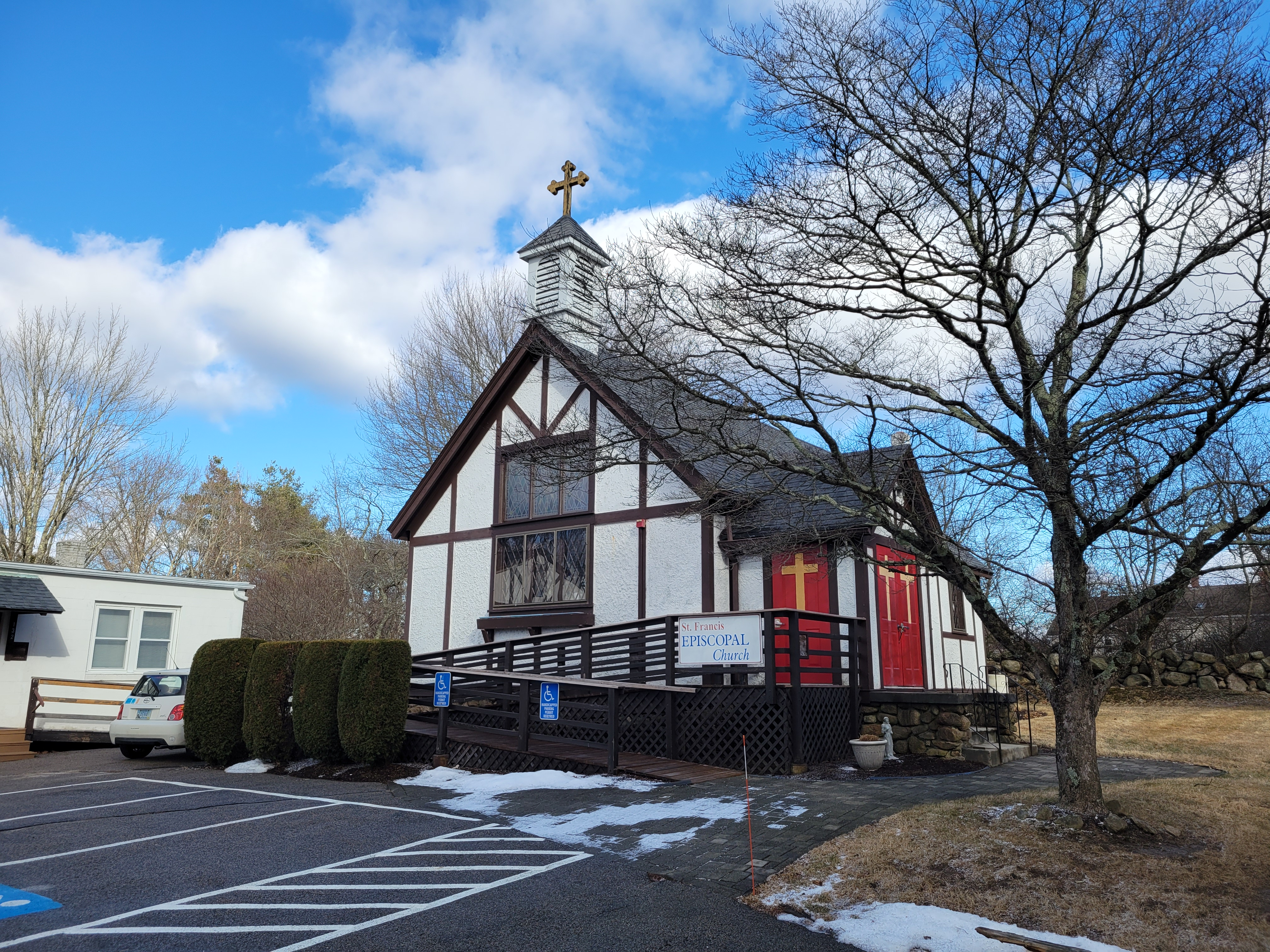
St. Francis Episcopal Church

Coventry Centre is a historic village in Coventry, Rhode Island.

The village was founded in 1809 and was originally called "Shoethread." The village was renamed Coventry Centre because it is the geographic center of the town. In the 18th century Bog iron was mined in Maroon Swamp (named after the color of the iron deposits), an area now known as Stump Pond. The area also contains Foster Ledge Quarry from which granite was transported by the Hartford Fishkill Railroad and used in various buildings across the state.
