= Coventry, Rhode Island =

- Town
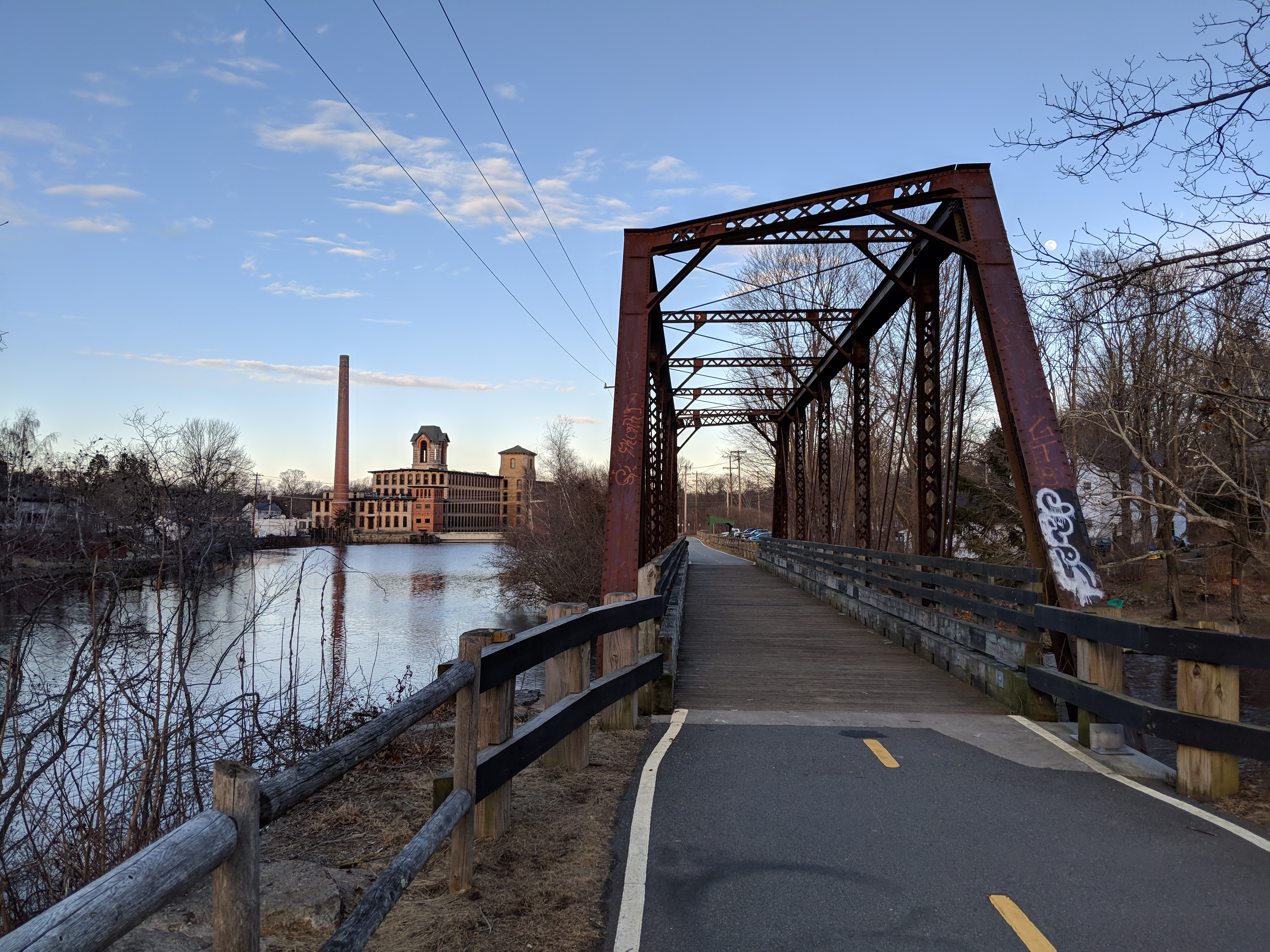
- Anthony Village Historic District

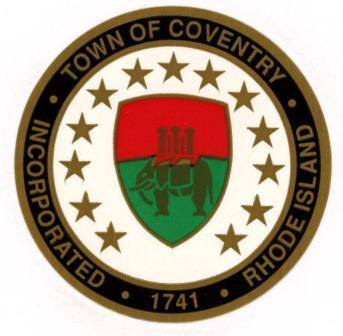
- Seal

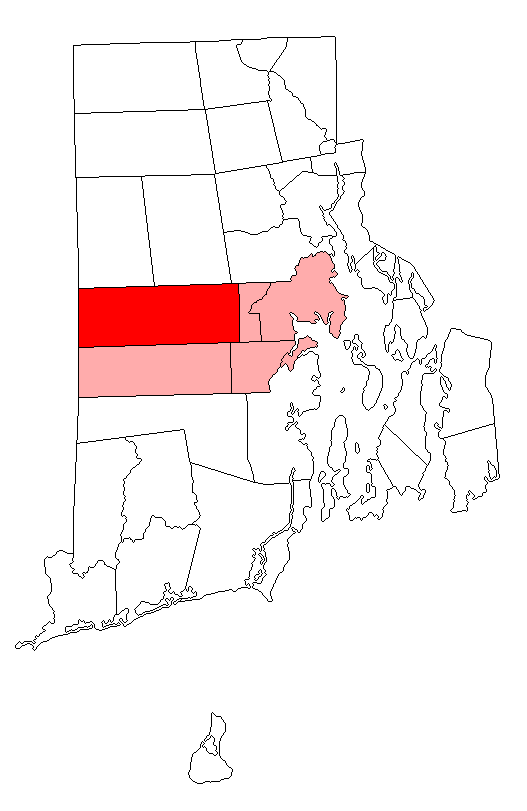
- Location in Kent County and the state of Rhode Island.
- Coordinates: 41°41′38″N 71°35′45″W
- Country: United States
- State: Rhode Island
- County: Kent

Area
  - Total: 62.4 sq mi (161.5 km^{2})
  - Land: 59.5 sq mi (154.2 km^{2})
  - Water: 2.8 sq mi (7.3 km^{2})
- Elevation: 381 ft (116 m)

Population (2020)
  - Total: 35,688
  - Density: 599/sq mi (231.4/km^{2})
- Time zone: UTC−5 (EST)
  - Summer (DST): UTC−4 (EDT)
- ZIP code: 02816
- Area code: 401
- FIPS code: 44-18640
- GNIS feature ID: 1220082
- Website: coventryri.gov

Coventry is a town in Kent County, Rhode Island. The population was 35,688 at the 2020 census and is part of the Pawtuxet River Valley.

== Geography ==
According to the United States Census Bureau, the town has a total area of 62.3 sq mi (161 km^{2}). 59.5 sq mi (154 km^{2}) of it is land and 2.8 sq mi (7.3 km^{2}) of it (4.49%) is water. The town is bordered by West Warwick to the east, Foster, Scituate, and Cranston to the north, West Greenwich and East Greenwich to the south, and Sterling, Connecticut, to the west. It is the largest town in land area in Rhode Island, being surpassed in total area only by South Kingstown, Rhode Island, with water and land area of 79.8 square miles (207 km^{2}).

== Climate ==
According to the Köppen Climate Classification system, Coventry has an oceanic climate, abbreviated "Cfb" on climate maps.

Climate data for Coventry, Rhode Island, 1991-2020 normals
Month	Jan	Feb	Mar	Apr	May	Jun	Jul	Aug	Sep	Oct	Nov	Dec	Year
Mean daily maximum °F (°C)	36.4 (2.4)	38.5 (3.6)	47.0 (8.3)	60.5 (15.8)	71.0 (21.7)	79.6 (26.4)	85.0 (29.4)	82.0 (27.8)	74.3 (23.5)	62.3 (16.8)	51.5 (10.8)	41.8 (5.4)	60.8 (16.0)
Daily mean °F (°C)	27.4 (−2.6)	29.4 (−1.4)	36.3 (2.4)	48.4 (9.1)	59.2 (15.1)	68.3 (20.2)	74.3 (23.5)	72.0 (22.2)	64.1 (17.8)	52.3 (11.3)	41.8 (5.4)	33.1 (0.6)	50.5 (10.3)
Mean daily minimum °F (°C)	18.4 (−7.6)	20.3 (−6.5)	25.6 (−3.6)	36.3 (2.4)	47.4 (8.6)	56.9 (13.8)	63.6 (17.6)	61.9 (16.6)	53.9 (12.2)	42.2 (5.7)	32.1 (0.1)	24.3 (−4.3)	40.2 (4.6)
Average precipitation inches (mm)	4.47 (114)	3.45 (88)	5.03 (128)	4.72 (120)	3.62 (92)	4.11 (104)	3.21 (82)	4.33 (110)	3.86 (98)	5.27 (134)	4.40 (112)	5.49 (139)	51.96 (1,321)
Source: NOAA

== History ==
Coventry was settled by English colonists in the early 18th century, when it was part of Warwick. The area was far from the center of Warwick and grew very slowly. However, by 1741, enough farmers (about 100 families) had settled in the area that they petitioned the General Assembly of Rhode Island to create their own town. The petition was granted, and the new town was named Coventry after the English city. For the rest of the 18th century, Coventry remained a rural town populated by farmers. Among the buildings that survive are the Waterman Tavern (1740s), the Nathanael Greene Homestead (1770), and the Paine Homestead (late 17th century to early 18th century). The oldest church is Maple Root Baptist Church which dates from the end of the 18th century. The congregation was organized in 1762 and was affiliated with the General Six-Principle Baptists.

During the Revolutionary War, the people of Coventry were supporters of the patriot cause. Nathanael Greene, a resident of Coventry, rose through the ranks to become a leading general of the American army. By the end of the war, Greene was second in command in the US army after George Washington.

In the 19th century, the Industrial Revolution came to Coventry with the building of the first mill in Anthony. Over the next century, the eastern end of town became very industrialized, with manufacturing centers being located in Anthony, Washington, Quidnick, and Harris villages. Many of the old factories still stand in the town, and the village centers remain mostly intact. The demographics of the town changed, as industrial jobs at these new mill villages attracted French Canadian and Irish immigrants. By the end of the 19th century, almost one fourth of the population was born outside the US, and French was the primary language for many of the people in the eastern part of Coventry. Not all immigrants worked in the factories. Census records from the late 19th century show that some owned farms.

By comparison, the western end of the town remained very rural, with the only centers of population being located at Greene and Summit, both established as railroad stations on the New York, New Haven and Hartford Railroad.

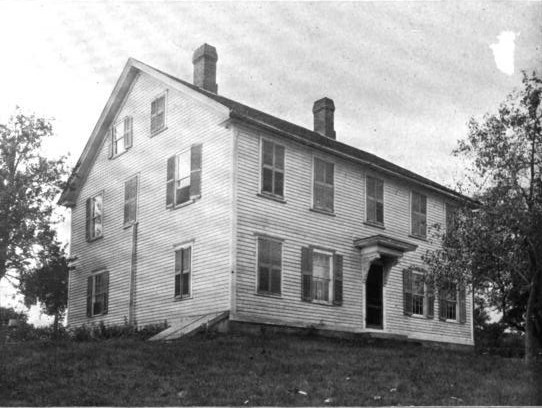
General Nathanael Greene Homestead pictured in 1902

In the 20th century, the town went through much change. The advent of the automobile brought an end of the railroad, and the track was dismantled in the 1970s. By the mid-20th century, industry had largely left the town and most of the factories closed.

In 2020, Soscia Holdings, a private company, purchased the dam and water flow rights to the Flat River Reservoir aka Johnson's Pond, [a man made reservoir, originally created to provide a backup water source for the towns mills in the event of a drought period]. for $1.7 million. Residents subsequently complained that Soscia was lowering water levels below historical norms, and in 2022 the Rhode Island General Assembly passed a law requiring the owners to obtain Department of Environmental Management approval before altering water levels. Soscia sued the state over the law; the suit was dismissed by a federal judge in 2024, and the dismissal was upheld by the First Circuit Court of Appeals in 2026. In June 2024, shortly after the initial dismissal, the Town of Coventry took the pond, dam, and associated land from Soscia Holdings by eminent domain, with a Superior Court judge approving the town's $157,000 valuation. Soscia filed a separate federal lawsuit against the town in 2025 challenging the taking, which remains ongoing.

== Recreation ==
Coventry offers a few recreation facilities. The town has youth sport leagues for football (boasting the 2006 American Youth Football National title), basketball, baseball, and softball. Carbuncle Pond off Route 14 (Plainfield Pike) near the Connecticut border is a 39-acre (160,000 m^{2}) pond that is popular for freshwater fishing. Johnson's Pond, a waterfront neighborhood, houses facilities for fishing and watersports. Wakeboarding Magazine rated Johnson's Pond as the best location for wakeboarding in Rhode Island. The 860-acre (3.5 km^{2}) George B. Parker woodland, owned by the Audubon Society of Rhode Island, offers several hiking trails. The woodland caretaker's home dates from the mid 18th century.

Audubon Trail in Coventry

The town has been investing in the Coventry Greenway, a pedestrian and bicycle path built on the old New York, New Haven and Hartford Railroad right-of-way and part of the East Coast Greenway, a trail running from Maine to Florida. The Coventry Greenway travels 15 miles (24 km) from the Connecticut state line to the West Warwick town line. The greenway has recently undergone a massive renovation and has reopened to the public as a walking, cycling, and horse trail.

== Villages ==
Coventry has numerous villages founded in the 19th century:

- Anthony – Mill village in the eastern part of the town
- Arkwright – Mill village founded by James DeWolf
- Blackrock – Named after a large dark rock rumored to be the site of Indian marriage ceremonies
- Colvintown – Named after original settlers
- Coventry Centre – Village in the geographic center of Coventry
- Fairbanks – Mill village along the Moosup River
- Greene – Old railroad village in the western end of town
- Harris – Mill village in the northeastern part of town
- Hopkins Hollow – Rural hamlet in the southwestern part of town
- Quidnick – Mill village on the border of West Warwick
- Rice City – Rural village in the northwestern part of town, dominated by Rice Tavern (1804), which used to serve travelers on their way to Connecticut
- Spring Lake – Former mill village
- Summit – Railroad village near Greene
- Tiogue – Formerly Barclay, after Robert Barclay
- Washington – Mill village in the center of the town
- Whaley's Hollow – Mill village and location of Waterman Tavern

== Historic homes ==
Coventry boasts many old homes, churches and cemeteries. Farmhouses from the 18th century can be found scattered around the town, and many are still private residences. On the eastern side of town, many homes from the 19th century can be found, ranging from the two-family mill workers residence to mansions owned by the town elites. The village of Greene and the Rice City and Hopkins Hollow parts of town have remained unchanged since the 19th century. Also, many of the churches in Coventry date from the 19th century and are still functioning churches.

== National Register of Historic Places listings in Coventry ==
- Isaac Bowen House (1795)
- Joseph Briggs House-Coventry Town Farm (1790)
- Carbuncle Hill Archaeological District, RI-1072-1079
- General Nathanael Greene Homestead (1770)
- Hopkins Hollow Village
- Interlaken Mill Bridge (1885)
- Moosup River Site (RI-1153)
- Paine House (1748)
- Pawtuxet Valley Dyeing Company (1859)
- Read School (1831)
- Rice City Historic District
- South Main Street Historic District (Coventry, Rhode Island)
- Waterman Tavern (1744) – Historical Marker for Waterman Tavern – HMdb
- William Waterman House
- Wilson-Winslow House (1812)

== Demographics ==
Historical population
Census	Pop.	Note	%±
1790	2,477		—
1800	2,423		−2.2%
1810	2,928		20.8%
1820	3,139		7.2%
1830	3,851		22.7%
1840	3,433		−10.9%
1850	3,620		5.4%
1860	4,247		17.3%
1870	4,349		2.4%
1880	4,519		3.9%
1890	5,068		12.1%
1900	5,279		4.2%
1910	5,848		10.8%
1920	5,670		−3.0%
1930	6,430		13.4%
1940	6,998		8.8%
1950	9,869		41.0%
1960	15,432		56.4%
1970	22,947		48.7%
1980	27,065		17.9%
1990	31,083		14.8%
2000	33,668		8.3%
2010	35,014		4.0%
2020	35,688		1.9%
U.S. Decennial Census

As of the census of 2020, there were 35,688 people and 14,503 households in the town. The population density was 604.2 inhabitants per square mile (233.3/km^{2}). There were 14,931 housing units in the town. The racial makeup of the town was 90.90% White, 0.94% African American, 0.23% Native American, 1.30% Asian, 0.03% Pacific Islander, 1.17% from other races, and 5.44% from two or more races. Hispanic or Latino of any race were 3.44% of the population.

There were 14,503 households, out of which 28.3% had children under the age of 18 living with them, 50.4% were married couples living together, 26.7% had a female householder with no spouse present, and 15.2% had a male householder with no spouse present. 8.5% of all households were made up of individuals, and 2.9% had someone living alone who was 65 years of age or older. The average household size was 2.43 and the average family size was 2.83.

In the town, the population was spread out, with 18.6% under the age of 18, 7.4% from 18 to 24, 25.8% from 25 to 44, 29.6% from 45 to 64, and 18.6% who were 65 years of age or older. The median age was 44 years.

The median income for a household in the town was $99,177, and the median income for a family was $115,718. The per capita income for the town was $46,557. About 7.9% of the population were below the poverty line, including 8.0% of those under age 18 and 6.0% of those age 65 or over.

== Government ==
Coventry town vote by party in presidential elections
Year	GOP	DEM	Others
2024	55.19% 11,222	42.42% 8,624	2.39% 486
2020	52.29% 10,461	45.61% 9,123	2.10% 420
2016	52.52% 9,199	40.15% 7,032	7.33% 1,283
2012	42.22% 6,969	55.26% 9,122	2.51% 415
2008	42.57% 7,367	55.60% 9,622	1.83% 316
2004	45.40% 7,249	52.71% 8,417	1.89% 301
2000	35.28% 5,111	58.08% 8,415	6.64% 962
1996	26.66% 3,633	54.92% 7,485	18.42% 2,511
1992	29.63% 4,466	40.38% 6,086	29.98% 4,519
1988	49.77% 6,348	49.88% 6,362	0.36% 46

Pursuant to its charter, Coventry's municipal government is classified as Council-Manager, with all powers vested in an elected Town Council, including the appointment of a Town Manager. Each Town councilperson represents one of five municipal districts. Members of the School Committee are also elected using these districts.

In the Rhode Island Senate, Coventry is a part of the 21st and 33rd Districts. In the Rhode Island House of Representatives it is part of the a part of the 25th, 26th, 27th, 28th, 29th and 40th Districts. At the federal level, Coventry is included in Rhode Island's 2nd congressional district and is currently represented by Democrat Seth M. Magaziner.

== Notable people ==
- Henry B. Anthony (1815–1884), US senator and the 21st governor of Rhode Island; anti-Catholic newspaperman; born in Coventry
- Henry P. Baldwin (1814–1892), US senator from and the 15th governor of Michigan; born in Coventry
- Allen Bestwick (born 1961), Race Announcer with NBC and ESPN/ABC. Notable for his NASCAR work
- Peter Frechette, actor
- Nathanael Greene (1742–1786), Continental Army general during the Revolutionary War
- Mike Stefanik, driver with NASCAR
- Desiree Washington, contestant of Miss Black America whom Heavyweight boxer Mike Tyson was found guilty of raping

== International relations ==
=== Twin towns – Sister cities ===
Coventry, Rhode Island is twinned with:

- Coventry, United Kingdom
