= Wilson–Winslow House =

Historic house in Coventry, Rhode Island, United States

- U.S. National Register of Historic Places
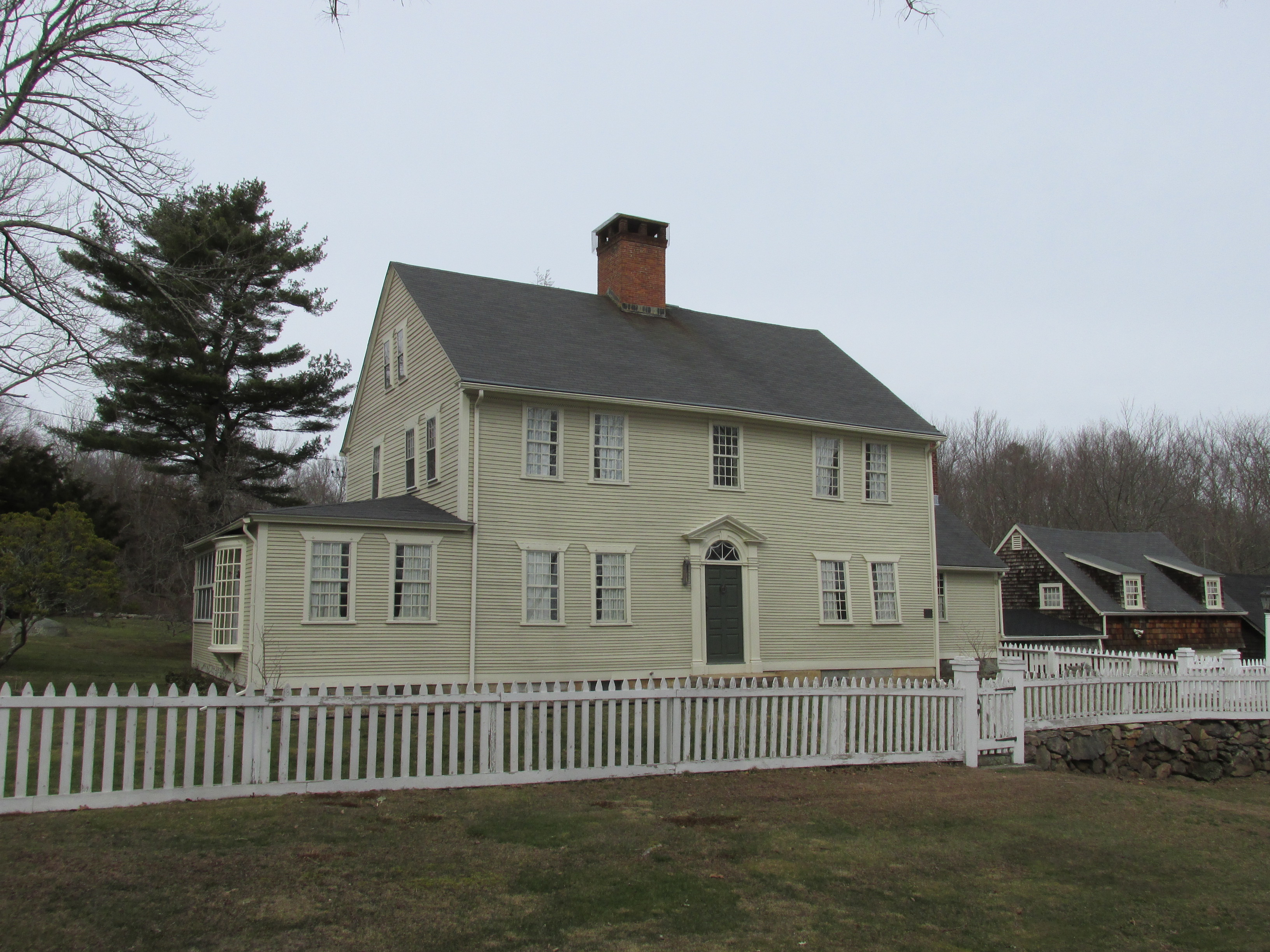
- Wilson–Winslow House

- Location within Rhode Island Location within the United States
- Location: 2414 Harkney Hill Road, Coventry, Rhode Island
- Coordinates: 41°41′9″N 71°40′45″W
- Area: 2 acres (0.81 ha)
- Built: 1814; 1936
- Architect: Edwin E. Cull (1936)
- Architectural style: Federal
- NRHP reference No.: 93001182
- Added to NRHP: November 4, 1993

The Wilson–Winslow House is a historic house in Coventry, Rhode Island. The main block of this 2 1/2-story wood-frame house was built in 1814 by Joseph Wilson, a farmer. It was occupied for most of the nineteenth century by his son, Israel Wilson, and it remained in the family's ownership until 1917. Architectural historian William Jordy noted that it was "very grand" for its rural location.

In 1935 the property was acquired by Winthrop Winslow and Agnes Parks Winslow of Providence for use as a summer home. The Winslows named the property Windy Parks Farm and hired architect Edwin E. Cull to extend and modernize the house. Cull was known for his skill in modernizing old houses while retaining their historic character. The property remained in the hands of the Mrs. Winslow until 1980.

The house was listed on the National Register of Historic Places in 1993.

== See also ==
- National Register of Historic Places listings in Kent County, Rhode Island
