= William Waterman House =

Historic house in Rhode Island, United States

- U.S. National Register of Historic Places
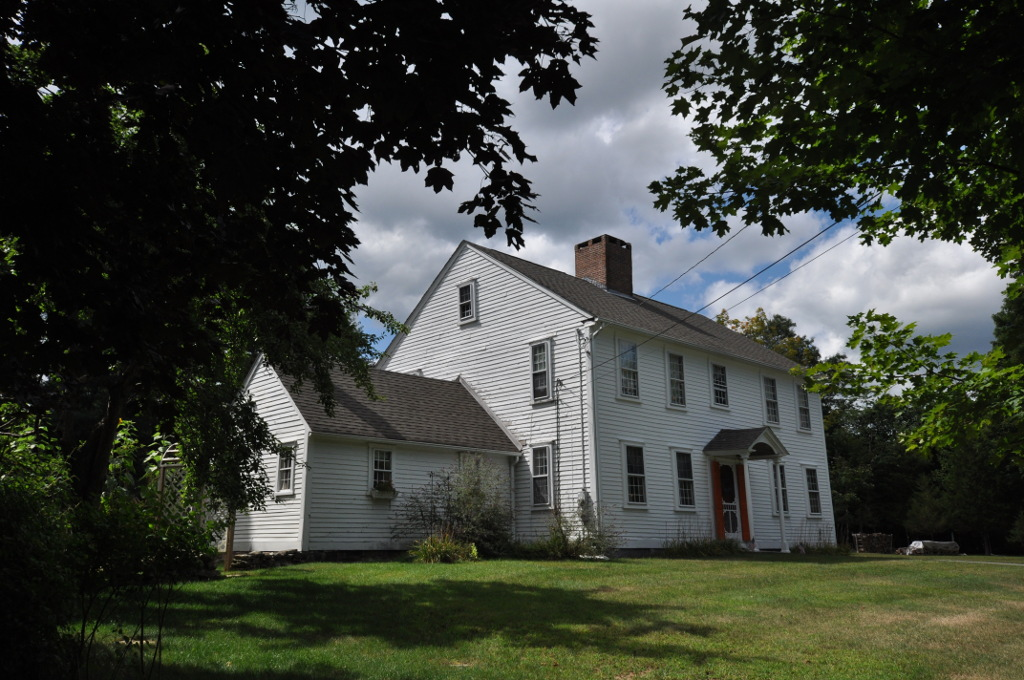

- Location within Rhode Island Location within the United States
- Location: Coventry, Rhode Island
- Coordinates: 41°42′16″N 71°41′47″W
- Architectural style: Federal
- NRHP reference No.: 80000080
- Added to NRHP: November 14, 1980

The William Waterman House is a historic house in Coventry, Rhode Island. It is located on the west side of Rhode Island Route 102, a short way north of its junction with Bowen Hill Road. The 2 1/2-story wood-frame house was built, probably before 1793, by William Waterman, a descendant of one of Coventry's earliest European settlers. It is five bays wide, with a large central chimney. Its entry is the most elaborate part of the main facade, flanked by paired pilasters and sheltered by a barrel-vaulted portico with triangular pediment.

The house was listed on the National Register of Historic Places in 1980.

== See also ==
- National Register of Historic Places listings in Kent County, Rhode Island
