= Joseph Briggs House =

Historic house in Rhode Island, United States

- Joseph Briggs House–Coventry Town Farm
- U.S. National Register of Historic Places
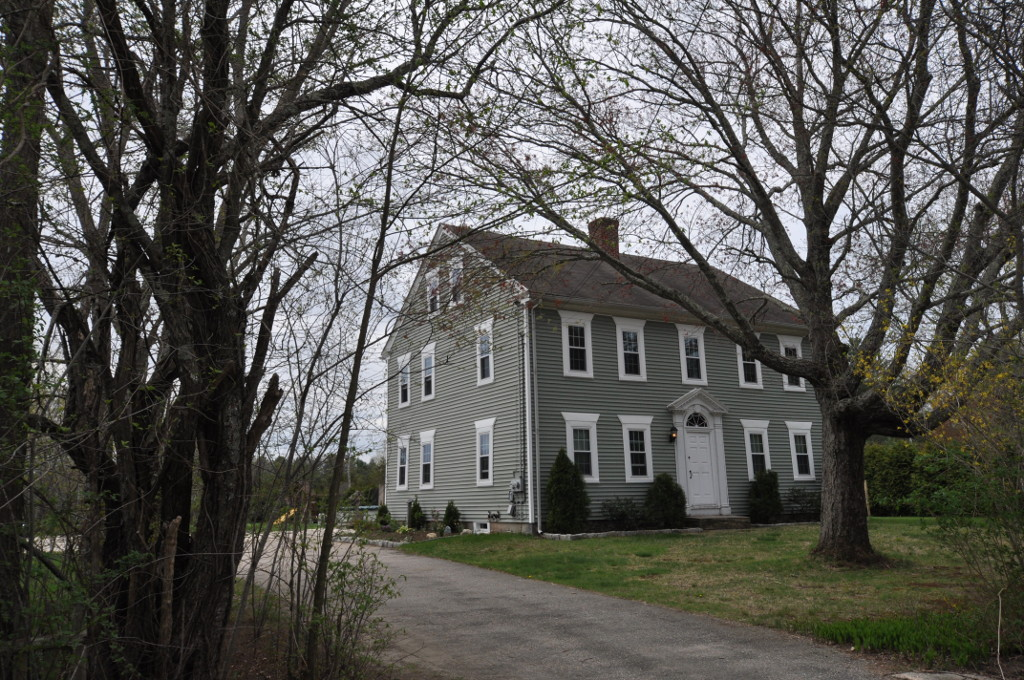

- Location within Rhode Island Location within the United States
- Location: 195 Town Farm Road, Coventry, Rhode Island
- Coordinates: 41°42′30″N 71°36′55″W
- Built: 1790
- Architectural style: Greek Revival, Federal
- NRHP reference No.: 87000997
- Added to NRHP: June 18, 1987

The Joseph Briggs House, also known as the Coventry Town Farm, is a historic house in Coventry, Rhode Island. The main block of the house, a 2 1/2-story wood-frame structure, was built c. 1790 by Joseph Briggs, and the property was purchased from his heirs in 1851 by the town for use as a poor farm. The town added a two-story ell to the rear of the house to provide additional housing space. The property is one of the few such poor farms to remain relatively intact. The farm was closed in the 1930s, after which the property fell into decline. It has since been rehabilitated as a two-family residence.

The house was listed on the National Register of Historic Places in 1987.

== See also ==
- National Register of Historic Places listings in Kent County, Rhode Island
