= South Main Street Historic District (Coventry, Rhode Island) =

Historic district in Rhode Island, United States

- U.S. National Register of Historic Places
- U.S. Historic district
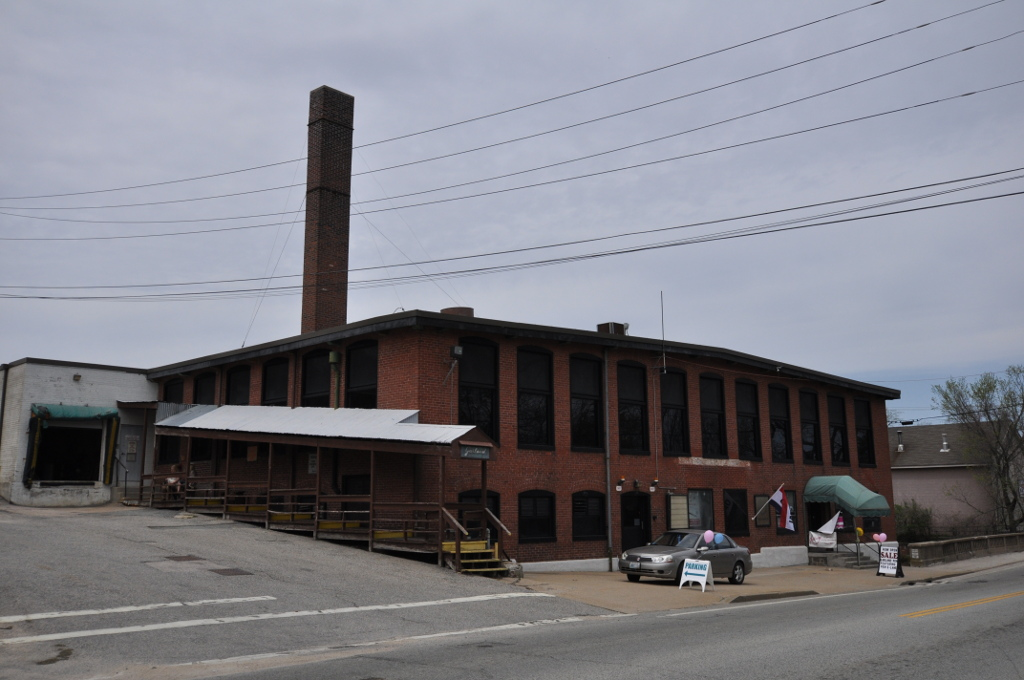
- Stillwater Mill building

- Location within Rhode Island Location within the United States
- Location: Coventry, Rhode Island
- Coordinates: 41°41′17″N 71°34′3″W
- Architectural style: Greek Revival, Federal
- NRHP reference No.: 87001064
- Added to NRHP: July 10, 1987

The South Main Street Historic District is a historic district in Coventry, Rhode Island. It extends along South Main Street from its crossing of the South Branch of the Pawtuxet River in the north, to just below Wood Street in the south, and includes a few properties on immediately adjacent streets. The area is almost entire residential, and was developed in the 19th century, providing housing for middle-class workers not directly affiliated with the mills that lined the river. About half the houses were built before 1850, and exhibit either Federal or Greek Revival styling, while most of the remaining houses were built before 1920. The principal non-residential structures are a VFW hall, which began as a mid-19th century residential structure associated with Rhode Island's prominent Whipple family, the Stillwater Company mill at the northern end of the district (1914), and the three-room Cady Street Schoolhouse (1844).

The area was added to the National Register of Historic Places in 1987.

== See also ==
- National Register of Historic Places listings in Kent County, Rhode Island
