= Moosup River Site (RI-1153) =

- U.S. National Register of Historic Places
- Nearest city: Coventry, Rhode Island
- NRHP reference No.: 87002083
- Added to NRHP: December 10, 1987

The Moosup River Site (RI-1153) is an archaeological site in Coventry, Rhode Island. The site is located on a bluff overlooking the Moosup River in western Coventry, not far from the Connecticut state line. The site was identified and excavated in 1985, yielding a quartzite Neville point, and radiocarbon dates to 3050 BCE.

The site was added to the National Register of Historic Places in 1987.

== See also ==
- National Register of Historic Places listings in Kent County, Rhode Island
