= Whaley's Hollow, Rhode Island =

Village in Rhode Island, United States

Coordinates: 41.719°N 71.669°W

Whaley's Hollow (also known as Pottersville and Maple Valley) is a village in Coventry, Rhode Island, United States.

Thomas Whaley was an early settler in the area who operated a saw mill and whose home still stands today on Maple Valley Road. John Waterman built Waterman’s Tavern circa 1747, which was used for town meetings until the new Town House was constructed in 1835 at Maple Valley Road and Matteson. The tavern also had stocks and a whipping post for punishment of crimes. During the American Revolution, the French Army under Rochambeau camped near the Tavern while marching to Virginia in 1781 and on their return in 1782. In 1851 Robert Potter, John Potter II and Albert Potter created a water-powered bobbin mill near Whaley's Hollow from Thomas Whaley’s old saw mill, and the village then became known as Pottersville. In 1872, the Union Bobbin Manufacturing Company was formed and operated from 1895 until the land was sold to Lewis E. Williams. Waterman’s Tavern still exists as a family home on Maple Valley Road and near the Whaley homesteads are three family cemeteries. Today, Whaley’s Hollow is often known as Maple Valley.
