= Moosup River =

River in Rhode Island and Connecticut, United States

Coordinates: 41.765989°N 71.771322°W

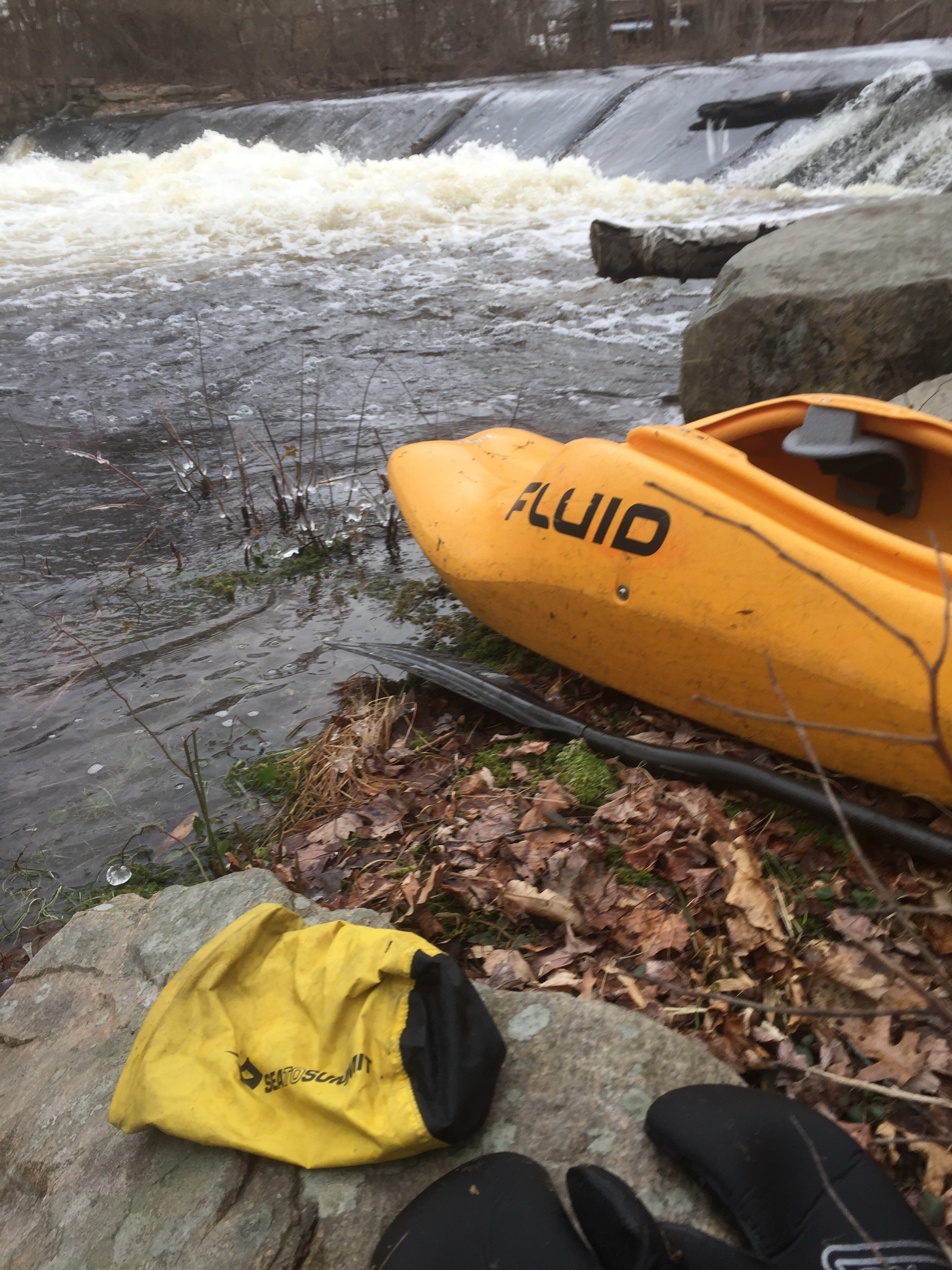
Action Paddling The Moosup River

The Moosup River is a river in the U.S. states of Rhode Island and Connecticut. It flows approximately 23.7 miles (38.1 km). The river is named after the Native American sachem Maussup.

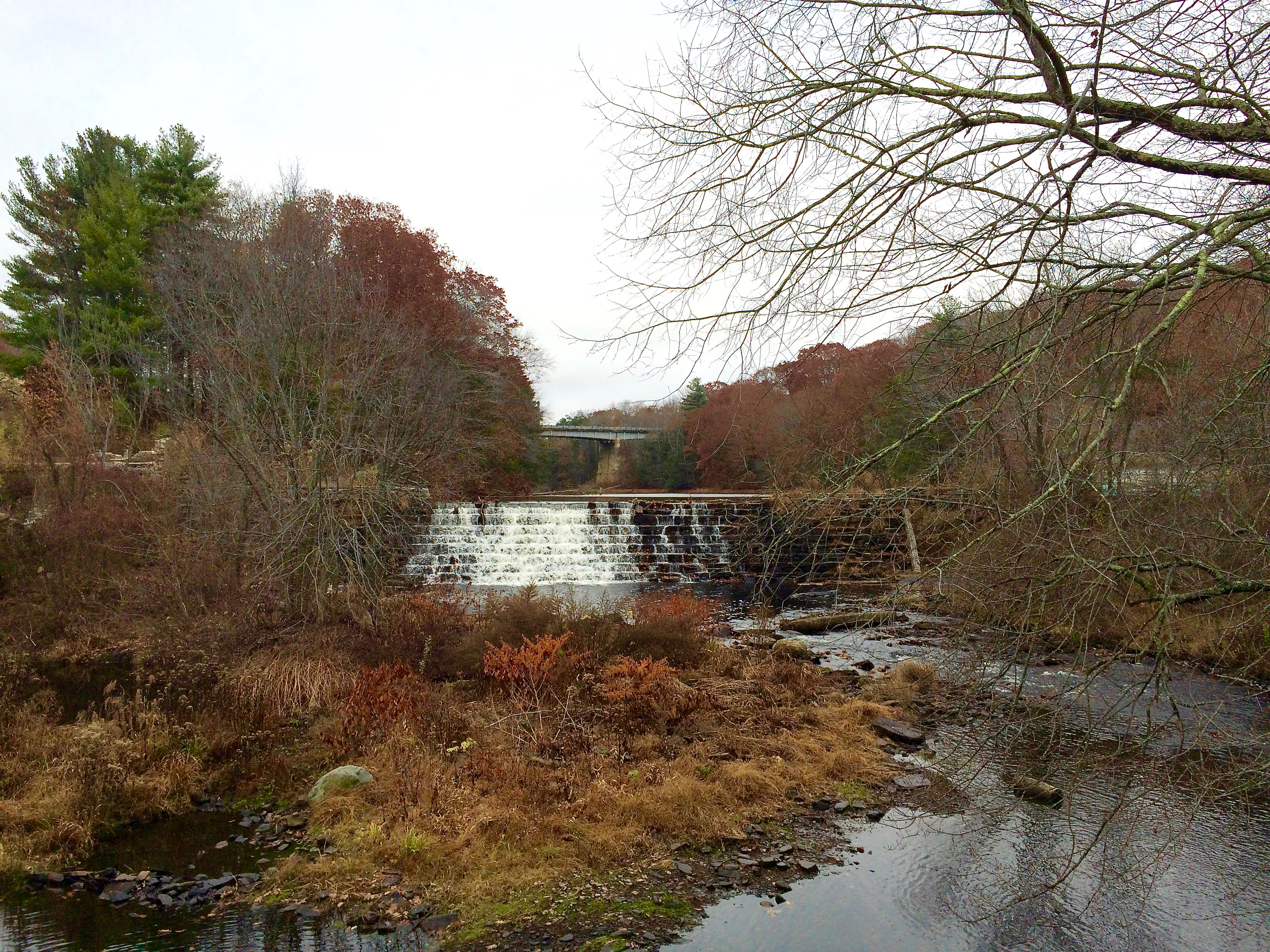
View north of the Moosup River's Brunswick Dam and the North Main Street (CT Route 14) bridge from the Moosup Valley State Park Trail in Plainfield, Connecticut.

== Course ==
The river rises from Clark Pond in Foster, Rhode Island. From there, it flows south through Foster and Coventry, then turns west and heads into Connecticut, flowing through Sterling and Plainfield to its mouth at the Quinebaug River.

== Dam Removal ==
The American Rivers organization has targeted the Moosup River for dam removal to help fish to swim upstream to spawn. In late June 2014 Moosup Dam #1 in Connecticut was removed and on September 29, 2015, the Griswold Rubber dam in Connecticut was removed.

== Crossings ==
Below is a list all crossings over the Moosup River. The list starts at the headwaters and goes downstream.

State	County	Town	Carrying
RI	Providence	Foster	Harrington Road
RI	Providence	Foster	Moosup Valley Road
RI	Kent	Coventry	Barbs Hill Road
RI	Kent	Coventry	RI 14
CT	Windham	Sterling	Deerfield Drive
CT	Windham	Sterling	Route 14A
CT	Windham	Sterling	Route 14
CT	Windham	Plainfield	Route 14
CT	Windham	Plainfield	Barber Hill Road
CT	Windham	Plainfield	River Street
CT	Windham	Plainfield	Pond Street
CT	Windham	Plainfield	South Main Street
CT	Windham	Plainfield	I-395
CT	Windham	Plainfield	Route 12
CT	Windham	Plainfield	Water Street
CT	Windham	Plainfield	Black Hill Road

== Tributaries ==
In addition to many unnamed tributaries, the following brooks feed the Moosup:

- West Meadow Brook
- Bucks Horn Brook
- Roaring Brook
- Vaughn Brook
- Quanduck Brook
- Angell Brook

== See also ==
- List of rivers in Rhode Island
- List of rivers in Connecticut
- Moosup River Site (RI-1153)
