= Summit, Rhode Island =

Village in Coventry, Rhode Island, U.S.

Coordinates: 41.6914°N 71.6977°W

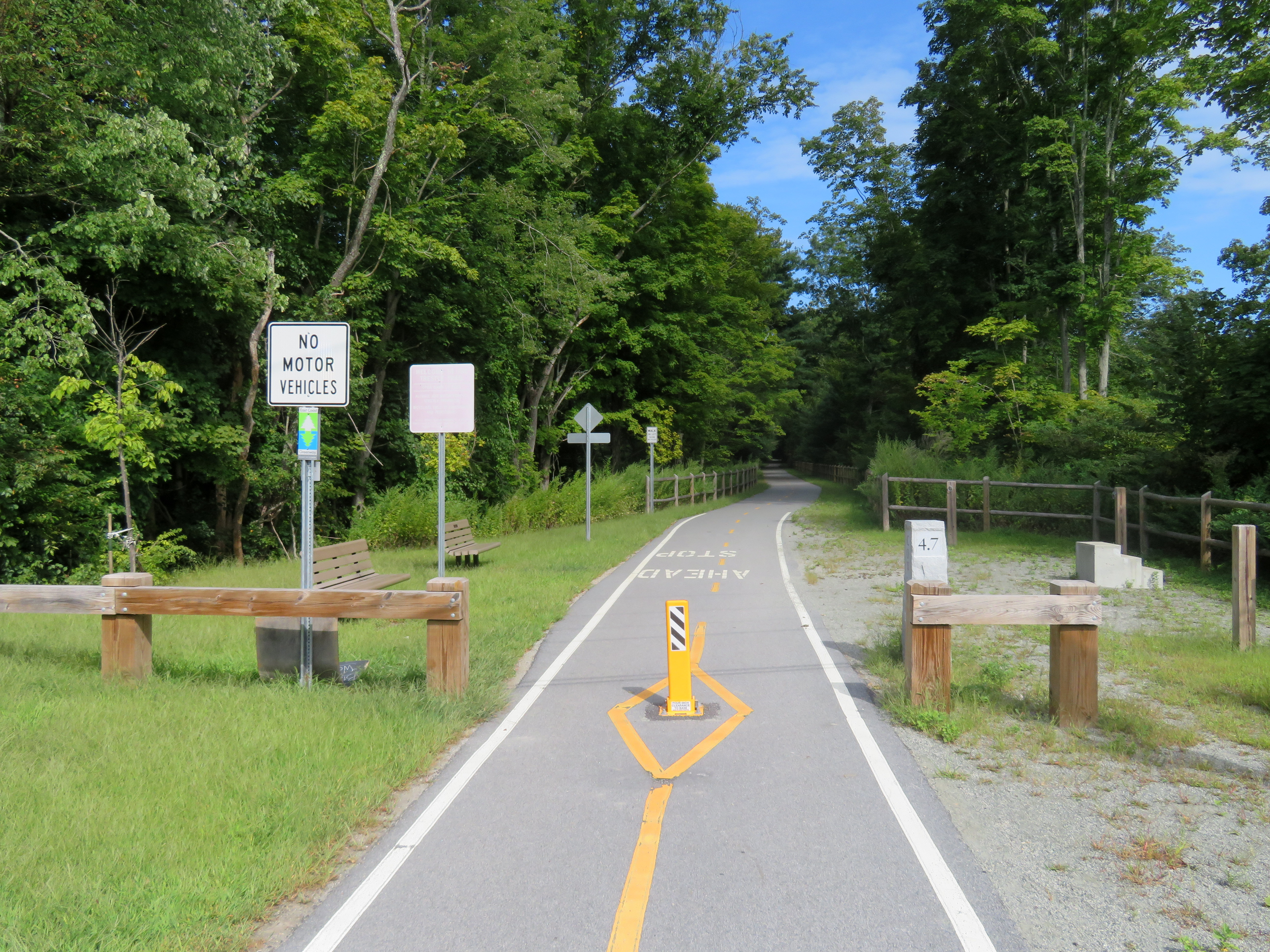
The Trestle Trail in Summit

Summit is a village within the town of Coventry, Rhode Island.

Summit developed as a railroad village near Greene, Rhode Island, with "half-dozen white clapboard houses [which] center around a church, a library, and a store." The original Summit Baptist Church building was constructed in 1862 and served the congregation until a new building was constructed nearby in 2001. The Coventry Historical Society now owns the old church building and maintains exhibits at the nearby Summit library. The Summit General Store, dating to 1888, has since been closed as of 2022. In 2025 the Summit General Store re-opened as Suzy-Q's Summit General. The village was once called Perry's Hollow, with the current name Summit signifying a high point of the area. Throughout the 1800s, the town hosted a station for the New York and New England Railroad, providing wood and water for incoming trains. The area has been mostly farmland, producing goods that were previously shipped to Providence, Rhode Island by train during its active years.
