= Carbuncle Hill Archaeological District, RI-1072-1079 =

Historic district in Rhode Island, United States

- U.S. National Register of Historic Places
- U.S. Historic district
- Location: Coventry, Rhode Island
- NRHP reference No.: 85002692
- Added to NRHP: September 28, 1985

The Carbuncle Hill Archaeological District encompasses a collection of archaeological sites in rural western Coventry, Rhode Island. Designated by the state as sites RI-1072 through RI-1079, this discontiguous cluster of sites has the potential to increase knowledge of prehistoric patterns of stone tool procurement, development, and use. The district was added to the National Register of Historic Places in 1985, primarily for its potential to yield further information.

== Background ==
The district includes eight discontiguous archaeological sites, located in the generally vicinity of Carbuncle Hill, located in far western Coventry, Rhode Island. These sites were identified in 1983 during a systematic archaeological survey of western Rhode Island, and all were subjected to shovel pit testing. The Carbuncle Hill area is judged to be desirable for prehistoric stone workers due to the presence of raw materials nearby, as well as having favorable conditions for subsistence hunting. None of the sites identified yielded datable material

== Sites ==
RI-1072 is a small site at which a single quartz flake was found. It is located adjacent to an outcropping containing raw quartz, and is assumed to be a site where activity was limited to the extraction of raw material. RI-1073 is a larger area with significant debitage, suggesting it is an area where raw materials where tools were manufactured and repaired. It has three distinct areas where work took place. RI-1074 is a small site at which a number of quartzite materials were found, including a quarry block weighing 30 to 50 pounds. RI-1075 is also a small site, at which primarily shattered stone remnants were found. This is an indication that fine edge production did not take place here; it may have been where larger chunks of raw material were reduced (to "good" material) for ease of transport.

RI-1076 is one of the district's largest sites, and its finds suggest a diversity of activities took place there. It may have been a short-term camp site at which subsistence activities took place, in addition to activities specifically geared toward tool production. RI-1077, RI-1078, and RI-1079 all appear to have been tool-making areas similar to RI-1073, but smaller. RI-1077 is the only site at which a marine shell fragment was found.

== See also ==
- National Register of Historic Places listings in Kent County, Rhode Island
