= Read School (Coventry, Rhode Island) =

- U.S. National Register of Historic Places
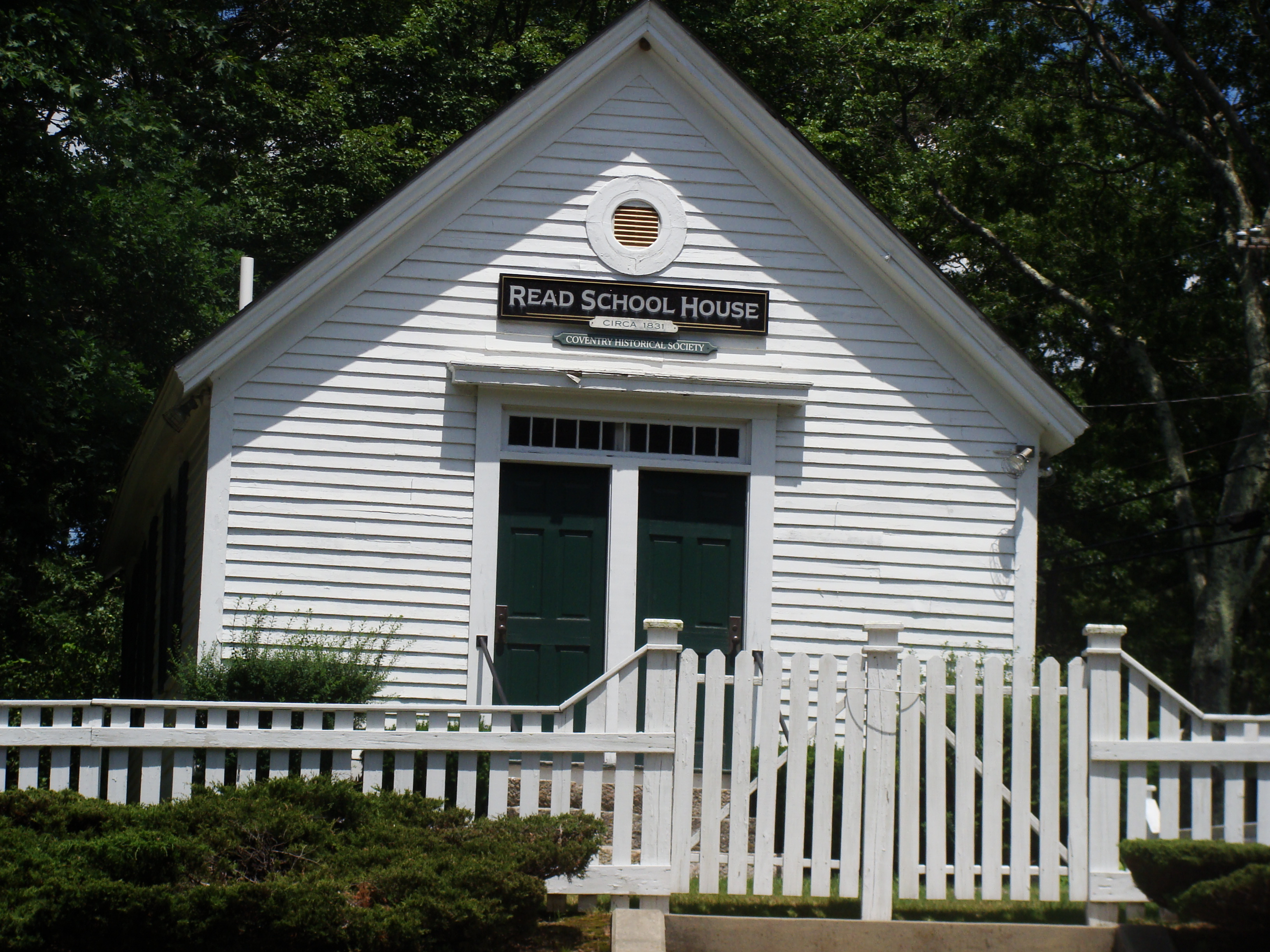
- Front of Read School

- Location within Rhode Island Location within the United States
- Location: Coventry, Rhode Island
- Coordinates: 41.70355°N 71.59728°W
- Built: 1831
- Architectural style: Greek Revival
- NRHP reference No.: 02000231
- Added to NRHP: March 20, 2002

The Read School is a historic schoolhouse at 1670 Flat River Road in Coventry, Rhode Island, United States. Built around 1831, it is one of the oldest, and the best-preserved, of Coventry's 19th-century schoolhouses. It is a rectangular wood-frame structure measuring 18 feet (5.5 m) by 24 feet (7.3 m), with a gable roof. The south side, its main facade, has a pair of doors under a ten-light transom window and a shallow entry cover. Above this is a round window, a detail echoed on the north side. It served the town as a school until 1951, and was then used for storage. It is now leased by the town to the Coventry Historical Society, who conduct tours and hold meetings there.

The building was listed on the National Register of Historic Places in 2002.

== Images ==
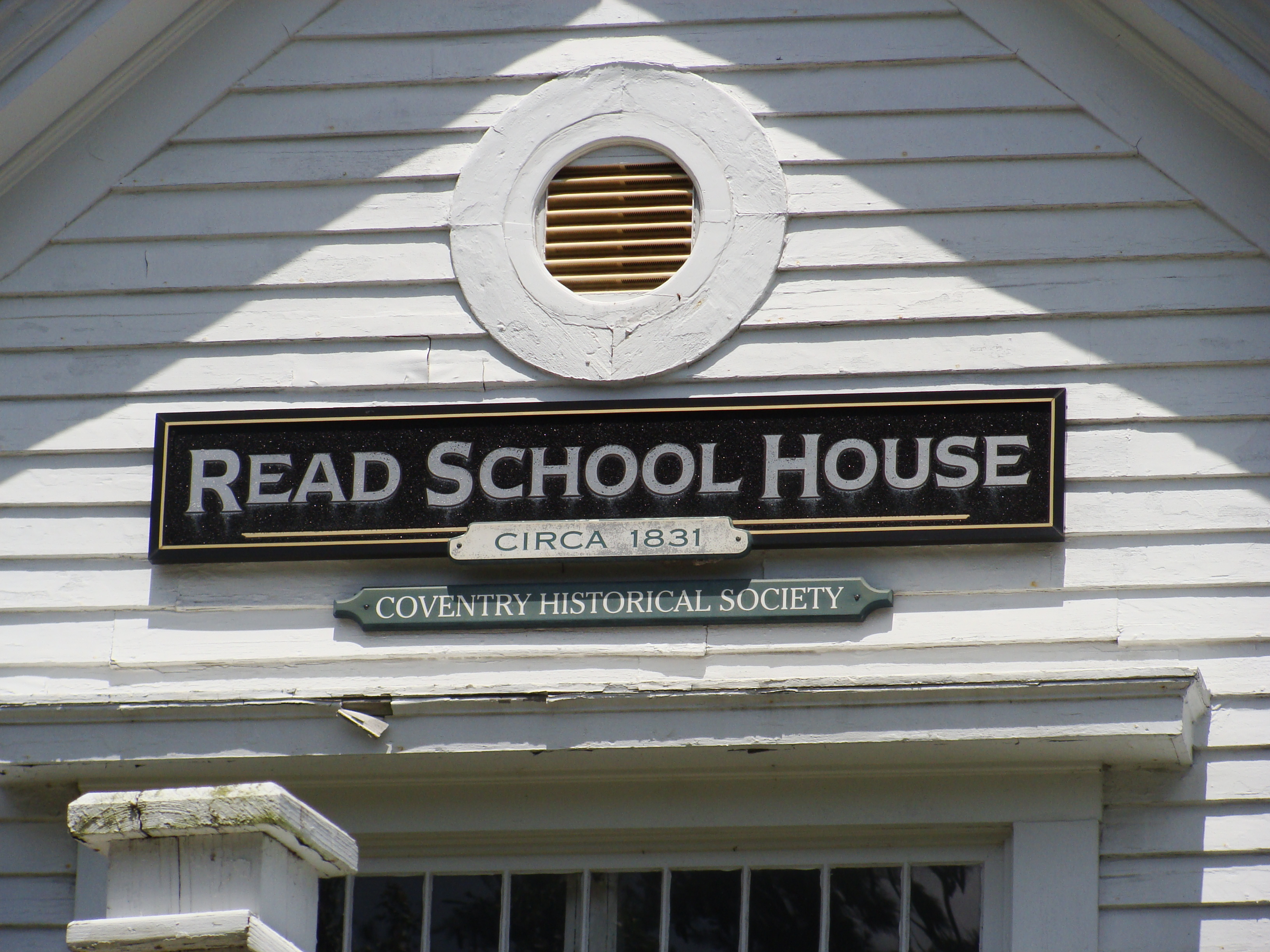
Sign on the front of Read School

== See also ==
- National Register of Historic Places listings in Kent County, Rhode Island
