= Arkwright, Rhode Island =

Census-designated place in Rhode Island, United States

Arkwright
- Village
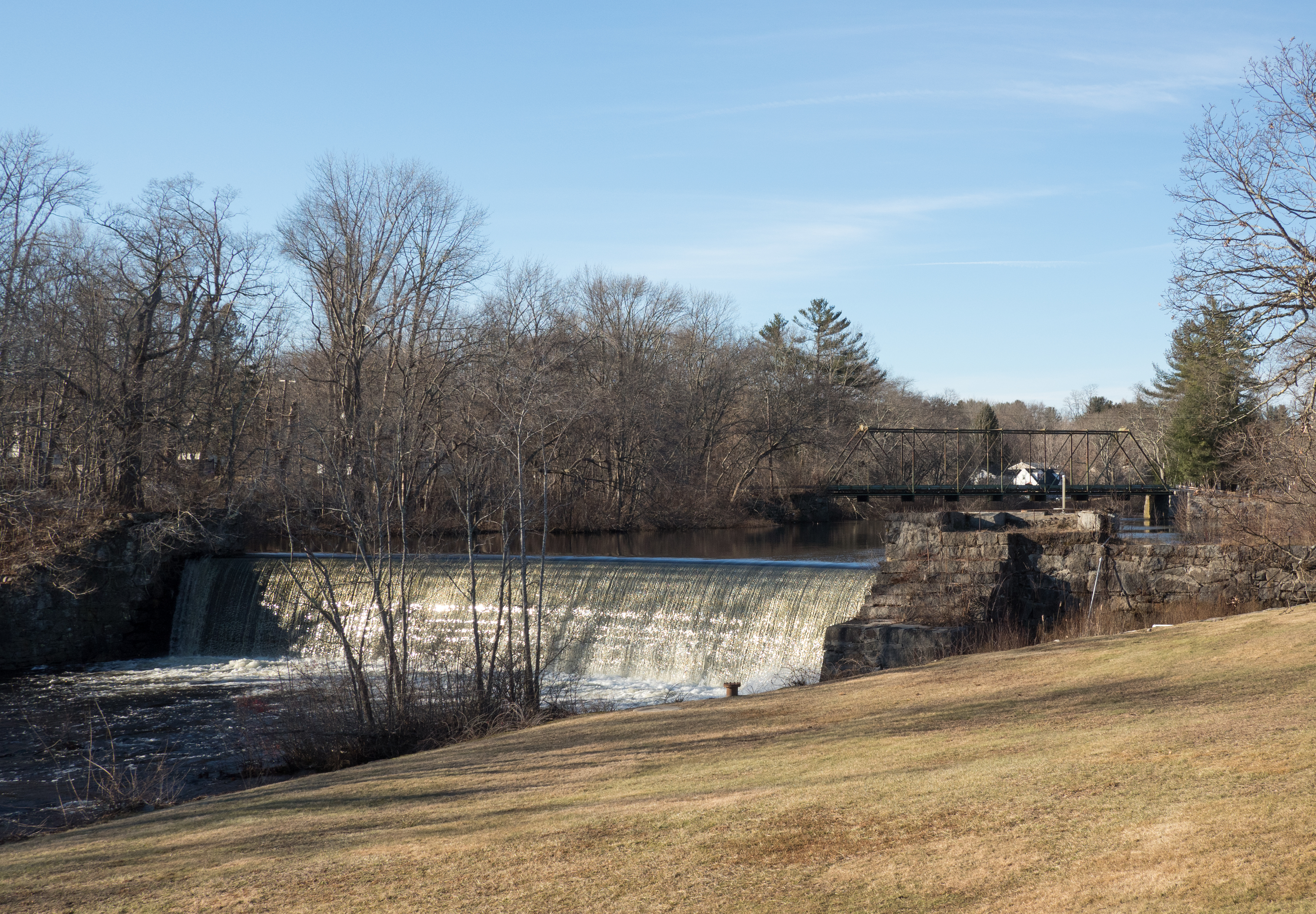
- Arkwright Bridge over the Pawtuxet River
- Interactive map of Arkwright
- Coordinates: 41°43′43″N 71°32′54″W
- Country: United States
- State: Rhode Island
- Established: 1700s
- Founder: Remington family
- Elevation: 50 m (164 ft)
- GNIS feature ID: 1218346

Arkwright is a village in the northeastern corner of Coventry, Rhode Island touching Cranston and Scituate, now connected by Route 115.

In the 1700s the Remington family owned a large parcel of land in the area, and the village became known as "Remington’s Run." In the early nineteenth century, the area was known as "Burlingame Mills" after the saw mill and grist mill run by Jabez and James Burlingame. In April 1809 the Burlingames, Elisha Arnold, and Nathan Potter sold the land to the Arkwright Manufacturing Company, which was owned by James DeWolf, a slave trader, estimated to have financed nearly 30 slaving voyages and transported 11,000 Africans to the United States; Doctor Caleb Fiske, Philip Fiske, and Asher Robbins. The company was named after Richard Arkwright, a British mill entrepreneur who had trained Samuel Slater.

Arkwright Manufacturing constructed its first textile mill in 1810. After a fire it was rebuilt in 1822, with various buildings being added later in the nineteenth and twentieth century. It was the beginning of the textile industry in New England, leading to strong economic ties with the Deep South, whose slave labor supplied the cotton. The mill passed through various owners. In 1883 it was sold and organized as the Arkwright–Interlaken Company to produce book cloth.

In 1922, its textile mills were temporarily shutdown by the New England Textile Strike over an attempted wage cut and hours increase.

The mill and various related buildings still survive today in the village; the mill is the last to operate in the villages of Coventry.
