= Washington, Rhode Island =

Village in Rhode Island, United States

Coordinates: 41°41′18″N 71°34′00″W

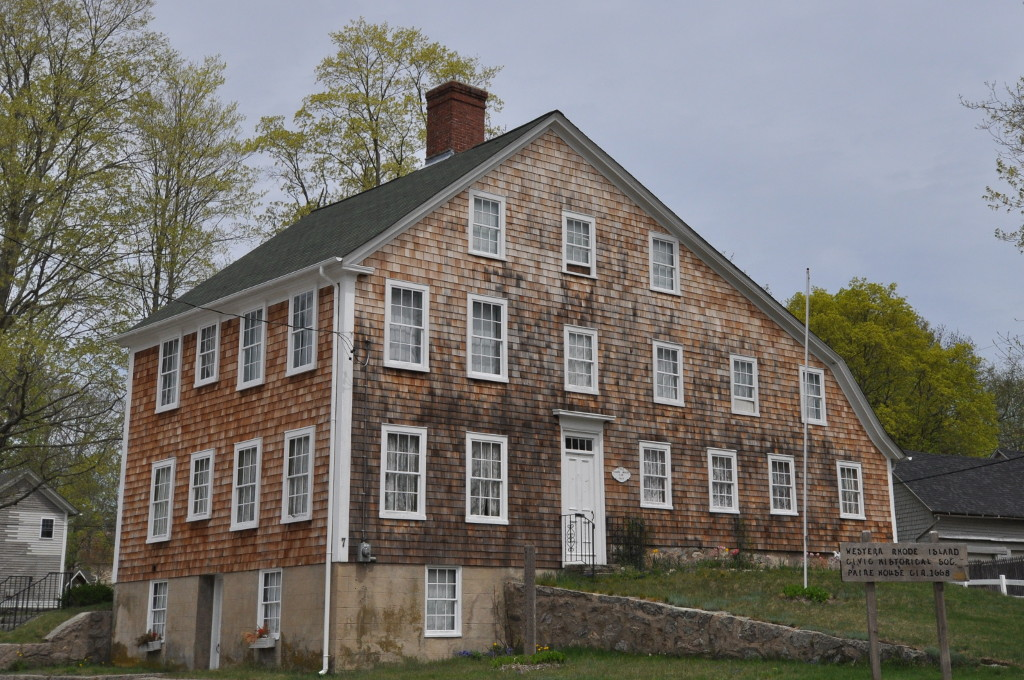
The Paine House in Washington

Washington is a village within the town of Coventry in Kent County, Rhode Island, and is part of the Pawtuxet River Valley.

== Background ==
The village was first settled in the 1670s around the time of King Philip's War. It was re-settled after the War and named Braytontown after a local family, the Braytons, who resided in the Paine House which is "the oldest surviving building in the village of Washington and was once a Tavern. This house was built in 1748 by Francis Brayton. Today the Paine House is home to the Western Rhode Island Civic Historical Society." The village was renamed "Washington" in 1810 after the Washington Manufacturing Company. The Hartford, Providence, and Fishkill Railroad maintained a train depot and other buildings near Station Street and along the bike path. The Spencer Marble Works (later Richmond Marble Work), which was located near the train depot, was operated by Oren Spencer and produced gravestones into the twentieth century. Starting around 1880 Calvin Hopkins operated a Blacksmith Shop at 137 South Main Street, which later developed into an automobile repair shop with the advent of the automobile. Coventry's town house was constructed in Washington in 1881. When the Flat River Road was widened the village-like character of the area changed drastically.
