= Rice City Historic District =

Historic district in Rhode Island, United States

- U.S. National Register of Historic Places
- U.S. Historic district
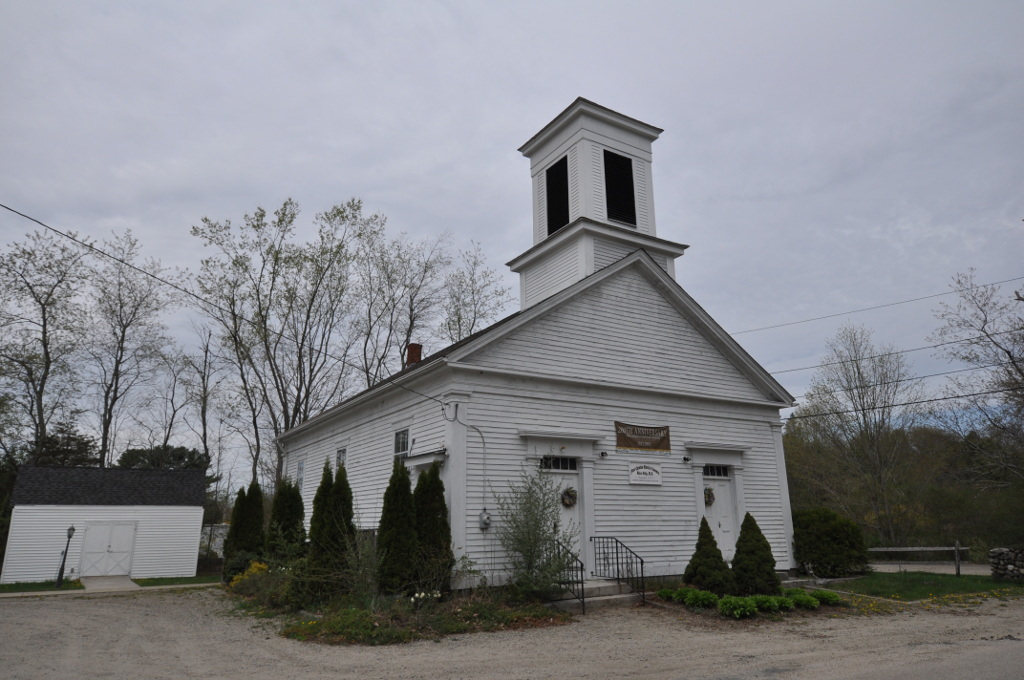
- Rice City Church

- Location within Rhode Island Location within the United States
- Nearest city: Coventry, Rhode Island
- Coordinates: 41°42′37″N 71°45′52″W
- Built: 1732
- Architectural style: Greek Revival, Federal
- NRHP reference No.: 80000078 (original); 00000551 (increase)

Significant dates
- Added to NRHP: June 9, 1980
- Boundary increase: May 26, 2000

The Rice City Historic District is a historic district in Coventry, Rhode Island. It encompasses the 19th-century village of Rice City, extending along Plainfield Pike (Rhode Island Route 14) for several miles between Sisson Road and Gibson Hill Road in the northwestern part of Coventry. The main village center is at the junction of the Pike and Vaughn Hollow Road, and there is a former industrial and commercial center at Fairbank's Corner, the junction with Flat River Road (Rhode Island Route 117). The architecture of the district is predominantly rural and residential, with Greek Revival and Federal style housing predominating. Rice City village is dominated by Rice Tavern (built 1804), which used to serve travelers on their way to Connecticut, as well as the Rice City Church (1846), the Democrat Schoolhouse, and the Obadiah Potter House (1846), all a short way up Vaughn Hill Road. At the western edge of the district, the modern Pike alignment diverges from the historical one at Gibson Hill Road, where the foundational remnants of agricultural settlements may be found.

The area was added to the National Register of Historic Places in 1980; an erroneously omitted property was formally added to the district in 2000.

== See also ==
- National Register of Historic Places listings in Kent County, Rhode Island
