= Pawtuxet Valley Dyeing Company =

- U.S. National Register of Historic Places
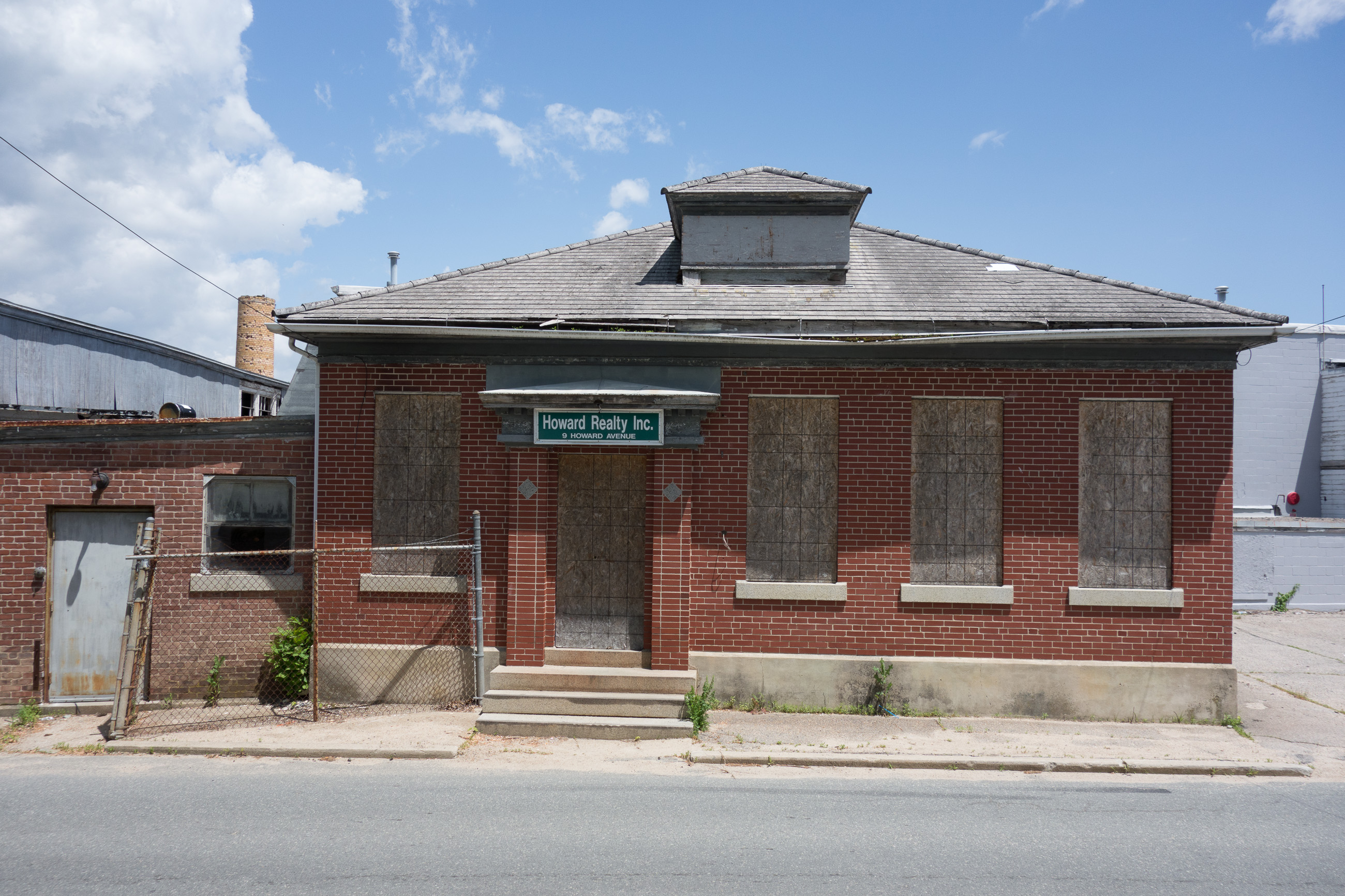
- Pawtuxet Valley Dyeing Company in 2014

- Location within Rhode Island Location within the United States
- Location: 9 Howard Ave., Coventry, Rhode Island
- Coordinates: 41°43′25″N 71°32′17″W
- Area: 9.2 acres (3.7 ha)
- Built: 1859
- NRHP reference No.: 05001296
- Added to NRHP: November 16, 2005

The Pawtuxet Valley Dyeing Company was a historic mill complex at 9 Howard Avenue in the town of Coventry, Rhode Island. The complex included three buildings: the main mill building and two pump houses, as well as the dam which impounds the Pearce Mill Pond, and the tailrace which evacuates water from the mill into the North Branch Pawtuxet River.

== Background ==
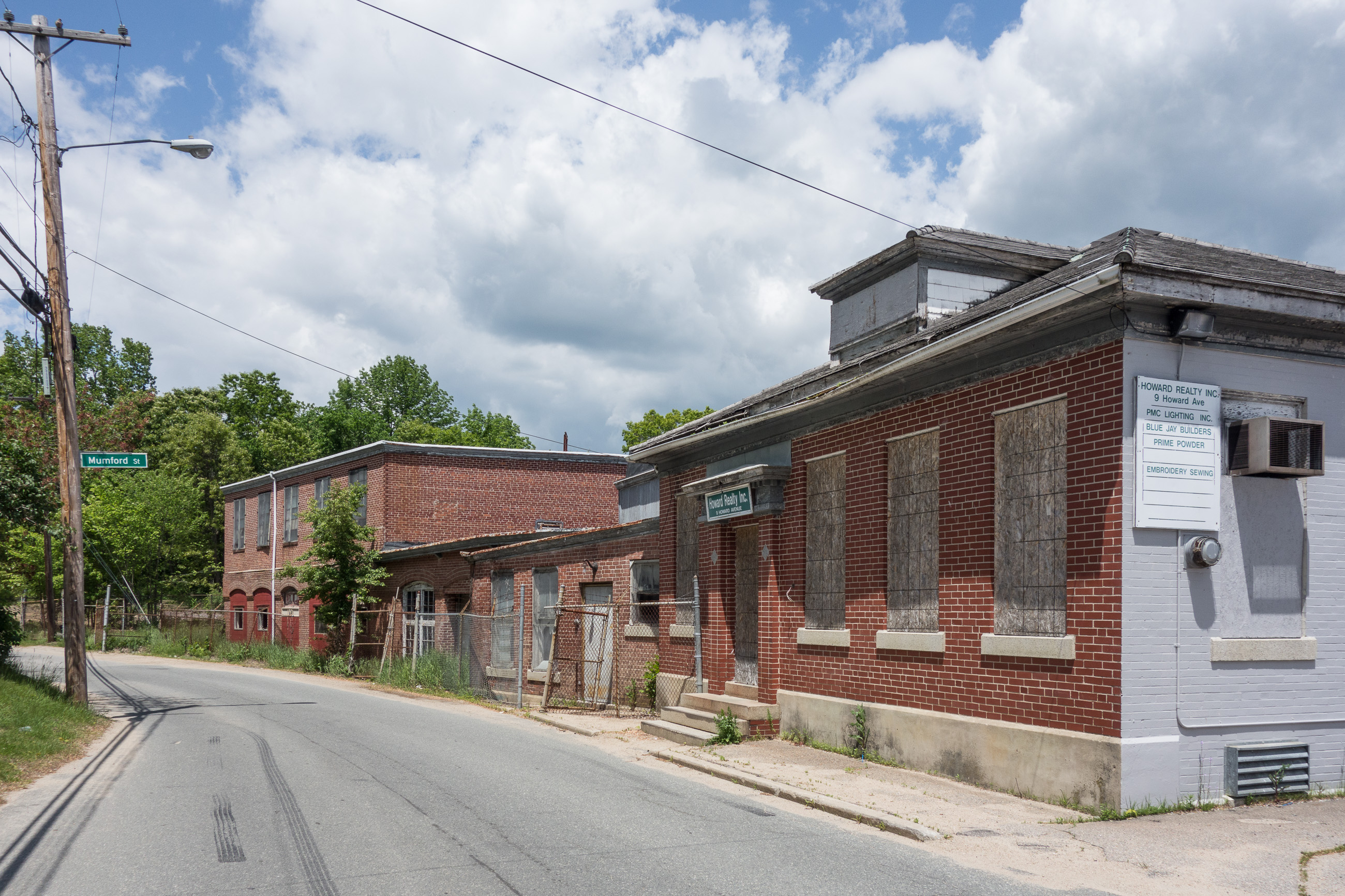
Pawtuxet Valley Dyeing Company in 2014

The main mill was an irregularly shaped complex of structures, which grew from the original Pearce Brothers Woolen Mill, a two-story rubble-stone structure that predates 1859, and has been extended in all directions. Most of the additions were made in the first two decades of the 20th century. The dam, about 100 feet (30 m) long, was an earth-fill structure faced in fieldstone and capped in 20th-century concrete, with a modern spillway. The tailrace was a trench lined with cut stone which exited from under the original mill building. The mill was established by Joseph W. Pearce, an English immigrant, and carded and spun wool. The March 11, 1916 Fibre & Faric, page 29, a trade publication, list William Waterhouse and the President of the Royal Chemical Co. and The Pawtuxet Valley Dyeing Co. The January 1918 edition of the trade publication "Textile Colorist", page 23, list the obituary for William Waterhouse and states that he was the president of The Pawtuxet Valley Dying Company beginning in 1907. The November 13, 1920 edition of Fibre and Fabric, a trade publication, lists James B. McDowell as president and J.B. Bennett as treasurer and general manager. A brief notice states that the company added a new machine, and is "quite busy with orders".

The mill complex was added to the National Register of Historic Places in 2005.

in December 2020, due to the now long abandoned structure's dangerously decrepit and collapsing condition and local youth and homeless population continually breaking in, the building was named a public hazard and completely torn down.

== See also ==
- National Register of Historic Places listings in Kent County, Rhode Island
