= Hopkins Hollow Village =

- U.S. National Register of Historic Places
- U.S. Historic district
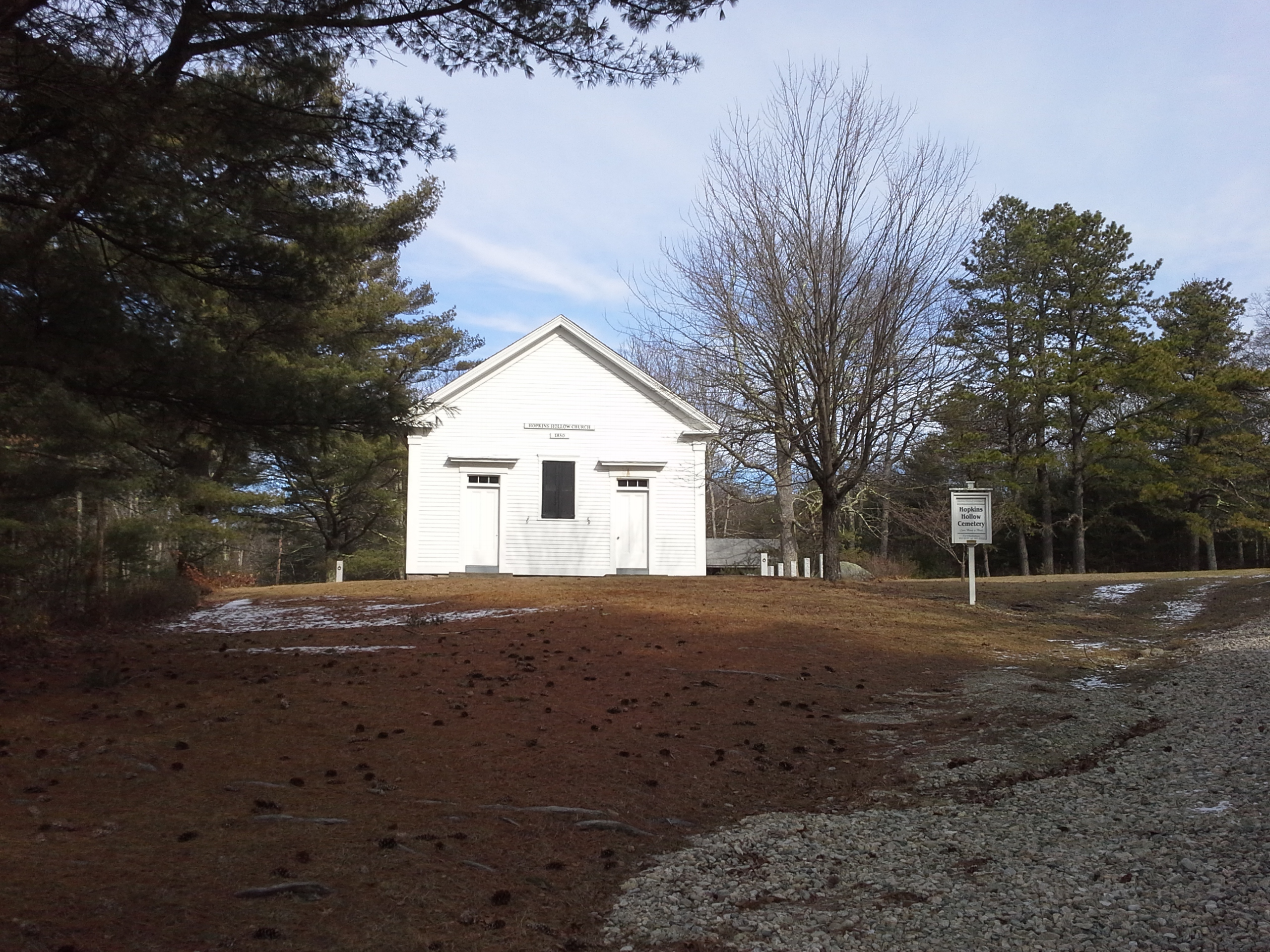
- Hopkins Hollow Church adjacent to the cemetery

- Location within Rhode Island Location within the United States
- Location: Hopkins Hollow Rd., Narrow Ln., Perry Hill Rd., Coventry and West Greenwich, Rhode Island
- Coordinates: 41.676°N 71.750°W
- Area: 2,000 acres (810 ha)
- Built: 1728
- Architectural style: Colonial, Federal
- NRHP reference No.: 09001290
- Added to NRHP: January 27, 2010

Hopkins Hollow Village is a historic district along Hopkins Hollow Road, Narrow Lane, and Perry Hill Road in Coventry and West Greenwich, Rhode Island. The village features American colonial and Federal era architecture. The Hopkins Hollow Church was built around 1850 in a Greek Revival style, located within the village adjacent to the Hopkins Hollow cemetery. The village was added to the National Register of Historic Places in 2010.

== See also ==
- National Register of Historic Places listings in Kent County, Rhode Island
