= Anthony, Rhode Island =

Village in Coventry, Rhode Island

Coordinates: 41.695°N 71.549°W

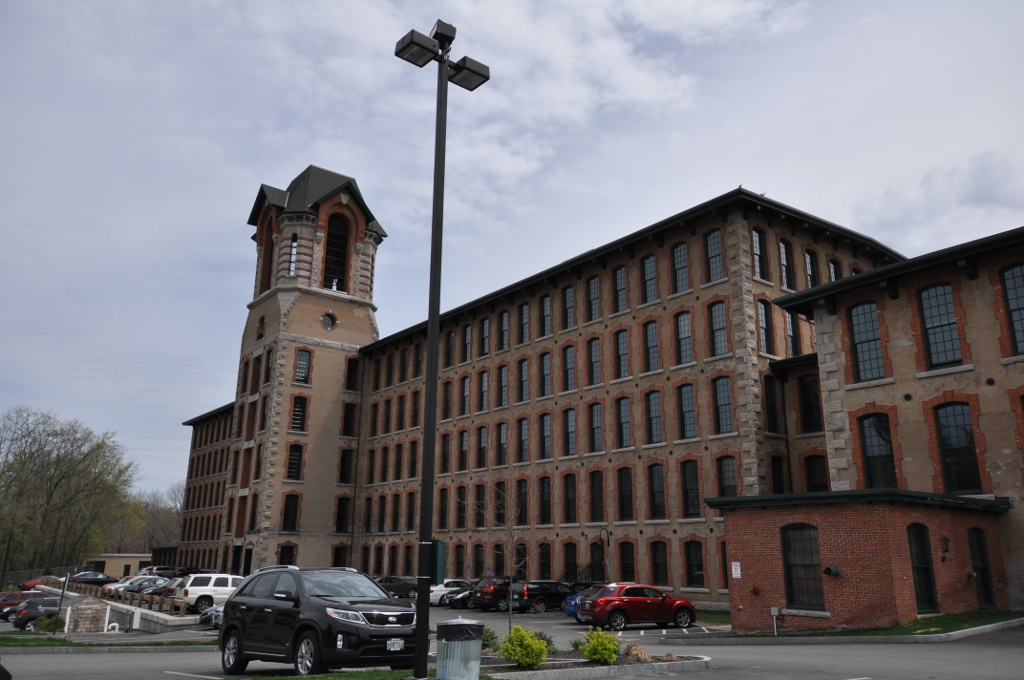
The Anthony Mills complex, today an apartment building

Anthony (previously known as Greenville and The Quaker Village) is a village along Route 117 within the town of Coventry, Rhode Island near the villages of Washington and Quidnick on the southwestern banks of the Pawtuxet River (Flat River). The village comprises "Anthony, Arnold, Boston, Mapledale, Meeting, Taft, Washington and Laurel Avenue."

Previously, Anthony was known as "Greenville" and "The Quaker Village." In the eighteenth century, the Greene Family were early owners of the land and gave their name to the village where they operated a gristmill, forge, and sawmill. Many of the village residents, including the Greene family, were Quakers, members of the Society of Friends and part of the Greenwich Monthly Meeting, attending meetings at the Quaker Meeting House on Meeting Street, which was used for services from 1825 to 1915. The building is now a club house. Anthony was established and renamed in 1805 by William and Richard Anthony who built a textile mill in the village as part of the Coventry Manufacturing Company. By 1811 another cotton mill was built and later the Coventry Manufacturing Company operated in the area as well. The General Nathanael Greene Homestead is located near the village.

The historic heart of the village, a 250-acre (100 ha) centered on Washington Street roughly between Sandy Bottom Road and Fairview Avenue and extending as far south as the Nathanael Greene Homestead, was named to the National Register of Historic Places in 2010 as the Anthony Village Historic District.

== See also ==
- National Register of Historic Places listings in Kent County, Rhode Island
