= National Register of Historic Places listings in Warwick, Rhode Island =

This is a list of Registered Historic Places in Warwick, Rhode Island, which has been transferred from and is an integral part of National Register of Historic Places listings in Kent County, Rhode Island.

Contents: Counties in Rhode Island

Bristol | Kent | Newport | Providence (Pawtucket | Providence (city) | Woonsocket) | Washington

This National Park Service list is complete through NPS recent listings posted May 1, 2026.

	Name on the Register	Image	Date listed	Location	City or town	Description
1	Apponaug Historic District	Apponaug Historic District	February 23, 1984 (#84001833)	3376, 3384, 3387, 3391, 3397-3399, and 3404 Post Rd. 41°38′18″N 71°27′04″W	Warwick	
2	John Waterman Arnold House	John Waterman Arnold House	September 10, 1971 (#71000013)	11 Roger Williams Ave. 41°45′18″N 71°23′56″W	Warwick	
3	Budlong Farm	Budlong Farm	August 18, 1983 (#83000165)	595 Buttonwoods Ave. 41°41′24″N 71°25′38″W	Warwick	
4	Buttonwoods Beach Historic District	Buttonwoods Beach Historic District	February 23, 1984 (#84001834)	Roughly bounded by Brush Neck Cove, Greenwich Bay, Cooper and Promenade Aves. 41°41′09″N 71°24′49″W	Warwick	
5	Cedar Hill	Cedar Hill	December 22, 2014 (#14001077)	4157 Post Rd. 41°40′42″N 71°27′10″W	Warwick	Now the Clouds Hill Victorian Museum.
6	Conimicut Lighthouse	Conimicut Lighthouse	March 30, 1988 (#88000269)	East of Conimicut Pt. in the Providence River; 41°43′01″N 71°20′45″W	Warwick	
7	Cowesett Pound	Cowesett Pound	September 4, 1987 (#87000994)	Cowesett Rd. 41°41′08″N 71°27′44″W	Warwick	
8	District Four School	District Four School	April 14, 1997 (#97000318)	1515 W. Shore Rd. 41°42′24″N 71°23′03″W	Warwick	
9	East Greenwich Historic District	East Greenwich Historic District	June 13, 1974 (#74000036)	Roughly bounded by Kenyon Ave., Division, Peirce, and London Sts., Greenwich Cove and Dark Entry Brook; 41°39′43″N 71°27′17″W	East Greenwich and Warwick	
10	Elizabeth Spring	Elizabeth Spring	August 18, 1983 (#83000166)	Off Forge Rd. 41°38′51″N 71°27′25″W	Warwick	
11	Forge Farm	Forge Farm	January 11, 1974 (#74000037)	40 Forge Rd. 41°38′19″N 71°27′06″W	Warwick	
12	Forge Road Historic District	Forge Road Historic District	February 23, 1984 (#84001861)	Forge Rd. from Ives Rd. to the Potowomut River; 41°38′18″N 71°27′04″W	Warwick	
13	Capt. Oliver Gardiner House	Capt. Oliver Gardiner House	August 18, 1983 (#83000167)	4451 Post Rd. 41°40′10″N 71°26′57″W	Warwick	
14	Gaspee Point	Gaspee Point	June 8, 1972 (#72000018)	Off Namquid Dr. 41°44′38″N 71°22′42″W	Warwick	
15	Caleb Gorton House	Caleb Gorton House	August 18, 1983 (#83000168)	987 Greenwich Ave. 41°42′30″N 71°27′53″W	Warwick	
16	Caleb Greene House	Caleb Greene House	November 28, 1978 (#78000063)	15 Centerville Rd. 41°41′55″N 71°27′39″W	Warwick	
17	Moses Greene House	Moses Greene House	August 18, 1983 (#83000169)	11 Economy Ave. 41°42′49″N 71°22′16″W	Warwick	
18	Peter Greene House	Peter Greene House	August 18, 1983 (#83000170)	1124 W. Shore Rd. 41°42′55″N 71°22′34″W	Warwick	
19	Richard Wickes Greene House	Richard Wickes Greene House	August 18, 1983 (#83000171)	27 Homestead Ave. 41°40′51″N 71°22′49″W	Warwick	
20	Greene-Bowen House	Greene-Bowen House	May 2, 1974 (#74000038)	100 Mill Wheel Rd. 41°41′26″N 71°25′19″W	Warwick	
21	Greene-Durfee House	Greene-Durfee House	August 18, 1983 (#83000172)	1272 W. Shore Rd. 41°42′46″N 71°22′48″W	Warwick	
22	Greenwich Cove Site		January 4, 1980 (#80000077)	Address Restricted	Warwick	
23	Greenwich Mills	Greenwich Mills	December 20, 2006 (#06001151)	42 Ladd St. 41°40′01″N 71°26′52″W	Warwick	
24	Hopelands	Hopelands	August 18, 1983 (#83000173)	Wampanoag Rd. 41°39′27″N 71°25′02″W	Warwick	Now the campus of the Rocky Hill School.
25	Indian Oaks	Indian Oaks	August 18, 1983 (#83000174)	836 Warwick Neck Ave. 41°40′55″N 71°22′35″W	Warwick	
26	Knight Estate	Knight Estate	February 23, 1984 (#84001864)	486 East Ave. 41°43′06″N 71°28′54″W	Warwick	
27	Lambert Farm Site, RI-269		November 3, 1983 (#83003798)	Address Restricted	Warwick	
28	Meadows Archeological District		November 3, 1983 (#83003800)	Address Restricted	Warwick	
29	Pawtuxet Village Historic District	Pawtuxet Village Historic District	April 24, 1973 (#73000050)	Bounded roughly by Bayside, S. Atlantic, and Ocean Aves., Pawtuxet and Providence rivers, and Post Rd. 41°45′49″N 71°23′27″W	Warwick	
30	Pontiac Mills	Pontiac Mills	June 5, 1972 (#72000019)	Knight St. 41°43′35″N 71°28′13″W	Warwick	
31	Rhode Island State Airport Terminal	Rhode Island State Airport Terminal	August 18, 1983 (#83000175)	572 Occupasstuxet Rd. 41°43′54″N 71°25′44″W	Warwick	
32	Christopher Rhodes House	Christopher Rhodes House	March 31, 1971 (#71000015)	25 Post Rd. 41°45′49″N 71°23′29″W	Warwick	
33	Trafalgar Site, RI-639		November 3, 1983 (#83003801)	Address Restricted	Warwick	
34	Warwick Civic Center Historic District	Warwick Civic Center Historic District	June 27, 1980 (#80000079)	Post Rd. 41°41′57″N 71°27′31″W	Warwick	
35	Warwick Lighthouse	Warwick Lighthouse	March 30, 1988 (#88000268)	1350 Warwick Neck Ave. 41°40′01″N 71°22′43″W	Warwick	
36	John R. Waterman House	John R. Waterman House	August 18, 1983 (#83000176)	100 Old Homestead Rd. 41°43′16″N 71°23′43″W	Warwick	
37	Oliver A. Wickes House	Oliver A. Wickes House	August 18, 1983 (#83000177)	794 Major Potter Rd. 41°40′25″N 71°28′30″W	Warwick	

== See also ==
- National Register of Historic Places listings in Kent County, Rhode Island
- List of National Historic Landmarks in Rhode Island
