= National Register of Historic Places listings in West Warwick, Rhode Island =

List of Registered Historic Places in West Warwick, Rhode Island, which has been transferred from and is an integral part of National Register of Historic Places listings in Kent County, Rhode Island

Contents: Counties in Rhode Island

Bristol | Kent | Newport | Providence (Pawtucket | Providence (city) | Woonsocket) | Washington

This National Park Service list is complete through NPS recent listings posted May 1, 2026.

== Current listings ==
	Name on the Register	Image	Date listed	Location	City or town	Description
1	Arctic Mill Historic District	Arctic Mill Historic District	April 4, 2025 (#100011595)	12, 15 21, 33, and 40 Factory Street; 41°42′26″N 71°31′16″W	West Warwick	
2	Centreville Mill	Centreville Mill	June 10, 2005 (#05000582)	3 Bridal Ave. 41°41′55″N 71°31′15″W	West Warwick	
3	Silas Clapp House	Silas Clapp House	May 7, 1973 (#73000049)	E. Greenwich Ave. 41°40′25″N 71°30′49″W	West Warwick	
4	Crompton Free Library	Crompton Free Library	November 20, 1978 (#78000062)	Main St. 41°41′06″N 71°31′27″W	West Warwick	
5	Crompton Mill Historic District	Crompton Mill Historic District	July 14, 2006 (#06000577)	20 Remington St., 53 and 65 Manchester St. 41°41′10″N 71°31′31″W	West Warwick	
6	Lippitt Mill	Lippitt Mill	January 11, 1974 (#74000053)	825 Main St. 41°43′12″N 71°31′38″W	West Warwick	
7	Royal Mill Complex	Royal Mill Complex	April 29, 2004 (#04000377)	125 Providence St. 41°42′49″N 71°31′00″W	West Warwick	
8	St. Mary's Church and Cemetery	St. Mary's Church and Cemetery	November 21, 1978 (#78000065)	Church St. 41°41′12″N 71°31′08″W	West Warwick	
9	William B. Spencer House	William B. Spencer House	February 14, 2012 (#08000716)	11 Fairview Ave. 41°43′11″N 71°31′59″W	West Warwick	
10	Valley Queen Mill	Valley Queen Mill	January 19, 1984 (#84001880)	700 Providence St. 41°43′11″N 71°29′29″W	West Warwick	
11	West Winds	West Winds	May 20, 1993 (#93000425)	300 Wakefield St. 41°43′30″N 71°30′52″W	West Warwick	

== Former listings ==
	Name on the Register	Image	Date listed	Date removed	Location	City or town	Description
1	Phenix Baptist Church		June 30, 1976 (#76002272)	Unknown	10 Fairview Ave.	West Warwick	

== See also ==
- National Register of Historic Places listings in Kent County, Rhode Island
- List of National Historic Landmarks in Rhode Island
