= National Register of Historic Places listings in East Greenwich, Rhode Island =

List of Registered Historic Places in East Greenwich, Rhode Island, which has been transferred from and is an integral part of National Register of Historic Places listings in Kent County, Rhode Island

Contents: Counties in Rhode Island

Bristol | Kent | Newport | Providence (Pawtucket | Providence (city) | Woonsocket) | Washington

This National Park Service list is complete through NPS recent listings posted May 1, 2026.

	Name on the Register	Image	Date listed	Location	City or town	Description
1	Armory of the Kentish Guards	Armory of the Kentish Guards	April 28, 1970 (#70000012)	Armory and Peirce Sts. 41°39′40″N 71°27′04″W	East Greenwich	
2	Richard Briggs Farm	Richard Briggs Farm	June 6, 2003 (#03000517)	830 South Rd. 41°36′25″N 71°30′38″W	East Greenwich	
3	East Greenwich Historic District	East Greenwich Historic District	June 13, 1974 (#74000036)	Roughly bounded by Kenyon Ave., Division, Peirce, and London Sts., Greenwich Cove and Dark Entry Brook; 41°39′43″N 71°27′17″W	East Greenwich and Warwick	
4	Fry's Hamlet Historic District	Fry's Hamlet Historic District	December 20, 1985 (#85003161)	2068, 2153, 2196, and 2233 S. County Trail; 41°38′21″N 71°29′58″W	East Greenwich	
5	Kent County Courthouse	Kent County Courthouse	April 28, 1970 (#70000013)	127 Main St. 41°39′39″N 71°27′02″W	East Greenwich	Now East Greenwich Town Hall
6	Massie Wireless Station	Massie Wireless Station	October 22, 2001 (#01001157)	1300 Frenchtown Rd. (New England Wireless and Steam Museum); 41°37′33″N 71°30′45″W	East Greenwich	
7	Spencer–Shippee–Lillbridge House	Spencer–Shippee–Lillbridge House	April 20, 2011 (#11000207)	12 Middle Rd. 41°39′16″N 71°27′51″W	East Greenwich	
8	Tillinghast Mill Site	Tillinghast Mill Site	March 10, 1988 (#88000164)	Frenchtown Park; 41°37′41″N 71°30′23″W	East Greenwich	
9	Tillinghast Road Historic District	Tillinghast Road Historic District	March 9, 1988 (#88000167)	Tillinghast Rd. 41°37′03″N 71°30′39″W	East Greenwich	
10	Gen. James Mitchell Varnum House	Gen. James Mitchell Varnum House	August 12, 1971 (#71000016)	57 Peirce St. 41°39′49″N 71°27′06″W	East Greenwich	
11	Clement Weaver-Daniel Howland House	Clement Weaver-Daniel Howland House	November 7, 1995 (#95001266)	125 Howland Rd. 41°39′32″N 71°28′40″W	East Greenwich	
12	Col. Micah Whitmarsh House	Col. Micah Whitmarsh House	February 18, 1971 (#71000017)	294 Main St. 41°39′34″N 71°27′01″W	East Greenwich	
13	Windmill Cottage	Windmill Cottage	May 22, 1973 (#73000051)	144 Division St. 41°39′49″N 71°27′23″W	East Greenwich	

== See also ==
- National Register of Historic Places listings in Kent County, Rhode Island
- List of National Historic Landmarks in Rhode Island
