= Greene House =

Greene House may refer to:

- Ernest Edward Greene House, Cullman, Alabama, listed on the NRHP in Cullman County, Alabama
- Greene-Marston House, Mobile, Alabama, NRHP-listed
- Greene Thomas House, Leslie, Arkansas, listed on the NRHP in Searcy County, Arkansas
- John T. Greene House, Sacramento, California, listed on the NRHP in Sacramento County, California
- Greene-Lewis House, Tallahassee, Florida, NRHP-listed
- George Greene House, Midland, Michigan, listed on the NRHP in Midland County, Michigan
- Benjamin F. Greene House, Central Falls, Rhode Island, NRHP-listed
- Nathanael Greene Homestead, Coventry, Rhode Island, NRHP-listed
- Christopher Rhodes Greene House, Coventry, Rhode Island, NRHP-listed
- Caleb Greene House, Warwick, Rhode Island, NRHP-listed
- Greene-Bowen House, Warwick, Rhode Island, NRHP-listed
- Greene-Durfee House, Warwick, Rhode Island, NRHP-listed
- Moses Greene House, Warwick, Rhode Island, NRHP-listed
- Peter Greene House, Warwick, Rhode Island, NRHP-listed
- Richard Wickes Greene House, Warwick, Rhode Island, NRHP-listed
- Nelson H. Greene House, Ritzville, Washington, listed on the NRHP in Adams County, Washington
- James Greene House, Yakima, Washington, listed on the NRHP in Yakima County, Washington
- Thomas A. Greene Memorial Museum, Milwaukee, Wisconsin, NRHP-listed

== See also ==
- Green House (disambiguation)
