= Spencer House =

Spencer House may refer to:

- Spencer House, Westminster, Greater London, England

== United States ==
- Spencer House (Hartford, Connecticut), listed on the National Register of Historic Places (NRHP) in Hartford County
- Spencer House in Columbus, Georgia, former home of educator William Henry Spencer
- Spencer House (Lima, New York), listed on the NRHP in Livingston County
- Spencer House (Syracuse, New York), listed on the NRHP in Onondaga County
- Arthur Champlin Spencer and Margaret Fenton Spencer House, Portland, Oregon, listed on the NRHP in Multnomah County
- Spencer–Shippee–Lillbridge House, East Greenwich, Rhode Island, listed on the NRHP in Kent County
- William B. Spencer House, West Warwick, Rhode Island, listed on the NRHP in Kent County
- Spencer House (Bishopville, South Carolina), listed on the NRHP in Lee County
- Spencer House (Cincinnati), a hotel from 1853 to 1935
