= Rhodes House (disambiguation) =

Rhodes House may refer to:

United Kingdom:

- Rhodes House in Oxford

United States (by state):

- Rhodes Cabin, Baker, NV, (listed on the NRHP in Nevada)
- Christopher Rhodes House, Warwick, RI, (listed on the NRHP in Rhode Island)
- Rhodes House (Brighton, Tennessee), (listed on the NRHP in Tennessee)
- Henry A. and Birdella Rhodes House, Tacoma, WA, (listed on the NRHP in Washington)
