= Crompton Free Library =

- U.S. National Register of Historic Places
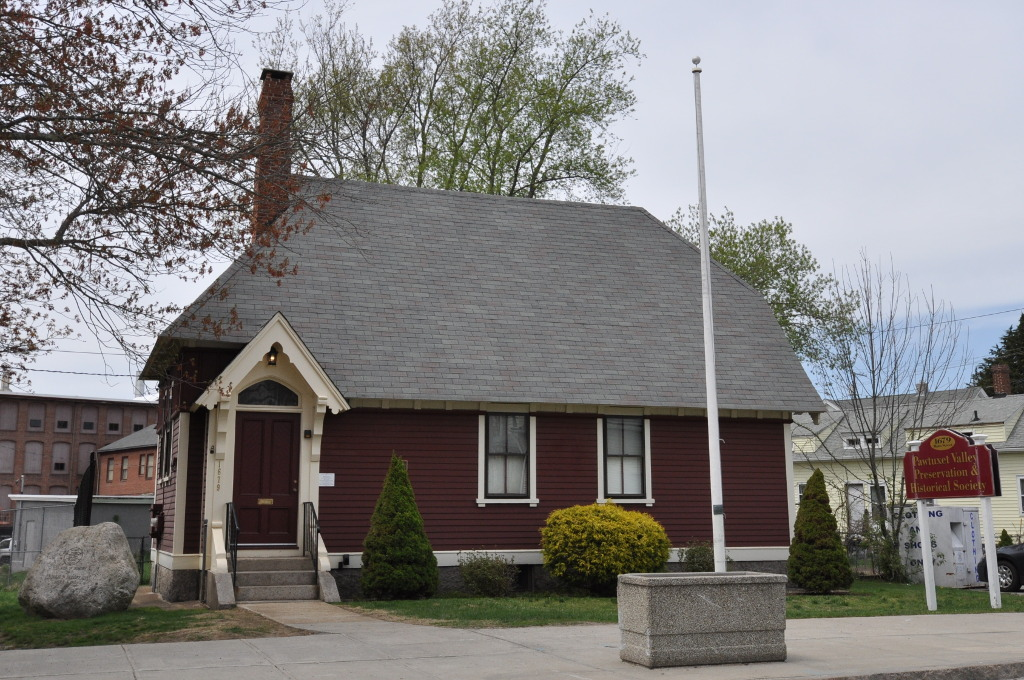

- Location within Rhode Island Location within the United States
- Location: 1679 Main Street, West Warwick, Rhode Island
- Coordinates: 41°41′11″N 71°31′23″W
- Built: 1876
- Architect: Stone & Carpenter
- Architectural style: Stick/Eastlake
- NRHP reference No.: 78000062
- Added to NRHP: November 20, 1978

The Crompton Free Library is a historic library building in West Warwick, Rhode Island. The small single-story wood-frame building was constructed in 1876, with funding from local mill owners. It is an excellent local example of a small Stick style public structure.

== Background ==
The building was listed on the National Register of Historic Places in 1978. It now serves as home to the Pawtuxet Valley Preservation and Historical Society.

== See also ==
- List of libraries in Rhode Island
- National Register of Historic Places listings in Kent County, Rhode Island
- List of historical societies in Rhode Island
