= Tillinghast Mill Site =

- U.S. National Register of Historic Places
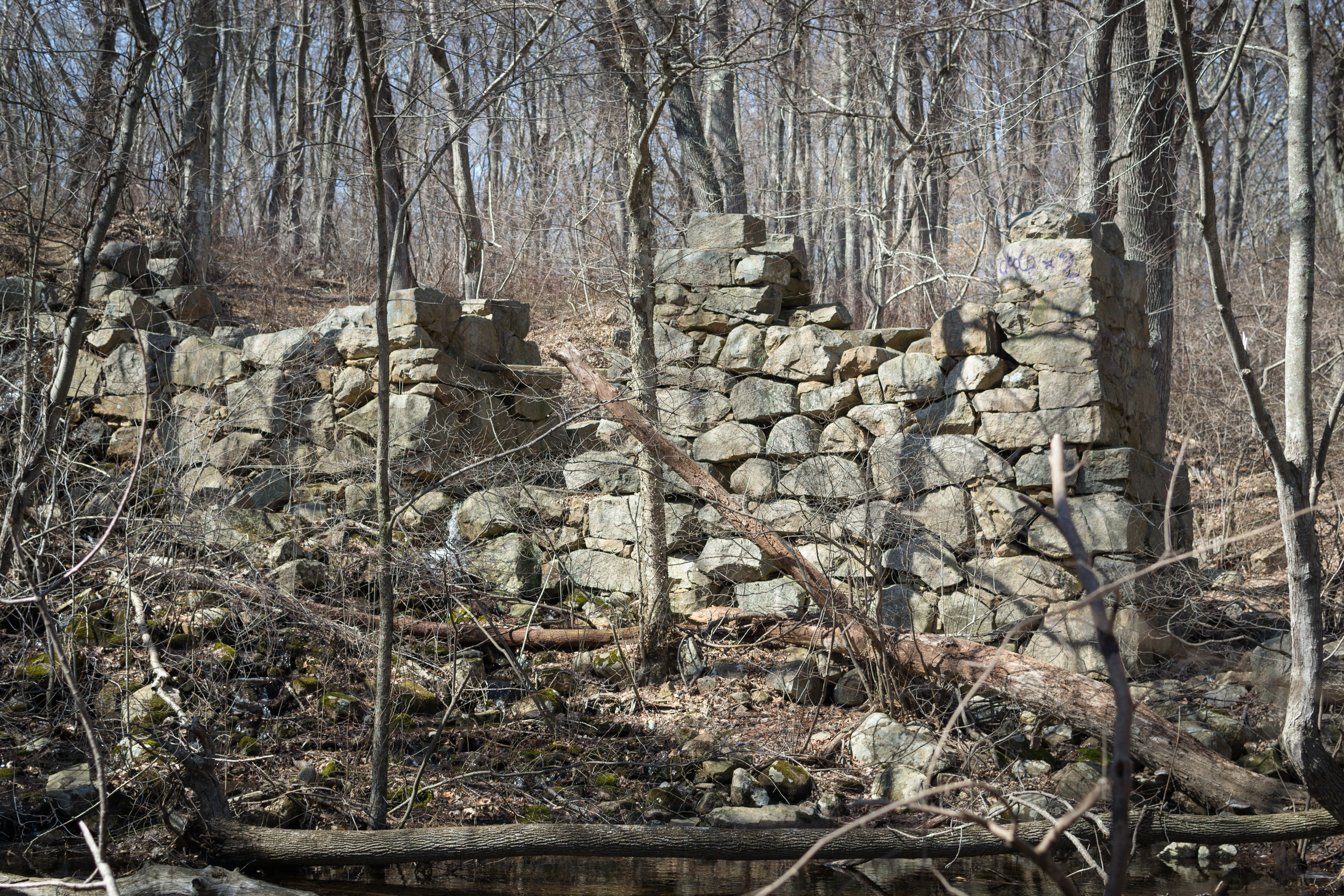
- Nearest city: East Greenwich, Rhode Island
- NRHP reference No.: 88000164
- Added to NRHP: March 10, 1988

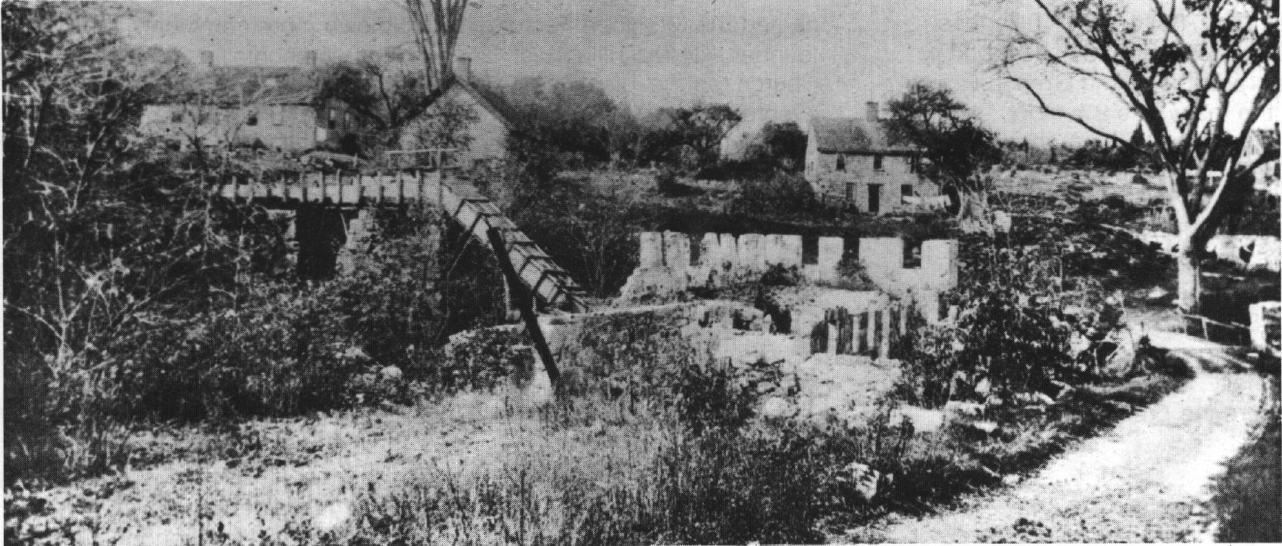
Tillinghast Factory ruins, 1915 photo

The Tillinghast Mill Site is an historic industrial site in East Greenwich, Rhode Island. The site is the location of a cotton mill established in 1812 most likely by Allin Tillinghast and Joseph Joslyn Tillinghast. The mill was more formally known as the Mount Hope Factory. The mill initially produced cotton yarn, but later made printed cloth, carpet, and twine. At its height the area included 25 mill worker houses as well as the waterworks, wood frame mill structure, and four story factory. The mill was in operation until at least 1905, but now only the foundational remnants of the mill and the waterworks remain.

The mill site was purchased by the town of East Greenwich in 1969 and it was listed on the National Register of Historic Places in 1988. The site is now part of Frenchtown Park, situated behind the Recreation Department Building, and can be accessed via Frenchtown Road. Many foundations still exist, including the structure of the mill itself, a boiler room, a restroom, bridge foundations, and the remnants of several dwellings.

== See also ==
- National Register of Historic Places listings in Kent County, Rhode Island
