= Caleb Gorton House =

Historic house in Rhode Island, United States

- U.S. National Register of Historic Places
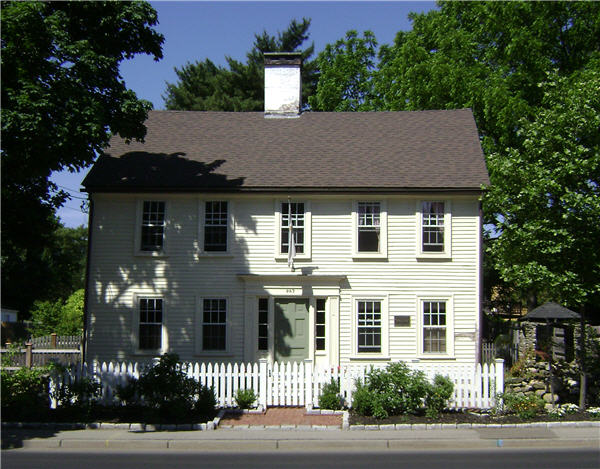

- Location within Rhode Island Location within the United States
- Location: Warwick, Rhode Island
- Coordinates: 41°42′30″N 71°27′53″W
- Architectural style: Federal
- MPS: Warwick MRA
- NRHP reference No.: 83000168
- Added to NRHP: August 18, 1983

The Caleb Gorton House is a historic 18th-century house located in Warwick, Rhode Island.

The Federal style house, a 2 1/2-story five-bay wood-frame structure with a central chimney, was built c. 1790. It was restored by Steve Tyson, a preservationist who was featured in the film Old House Soul.

The house was listed on the National Register of Historic Places in 1983.

== See also ==
- National Register of Historic Places in Kent County, Rhode Island
