= West Winds =

Historic house in Rhode Island, United States

- U.S. National Register of Historic Places
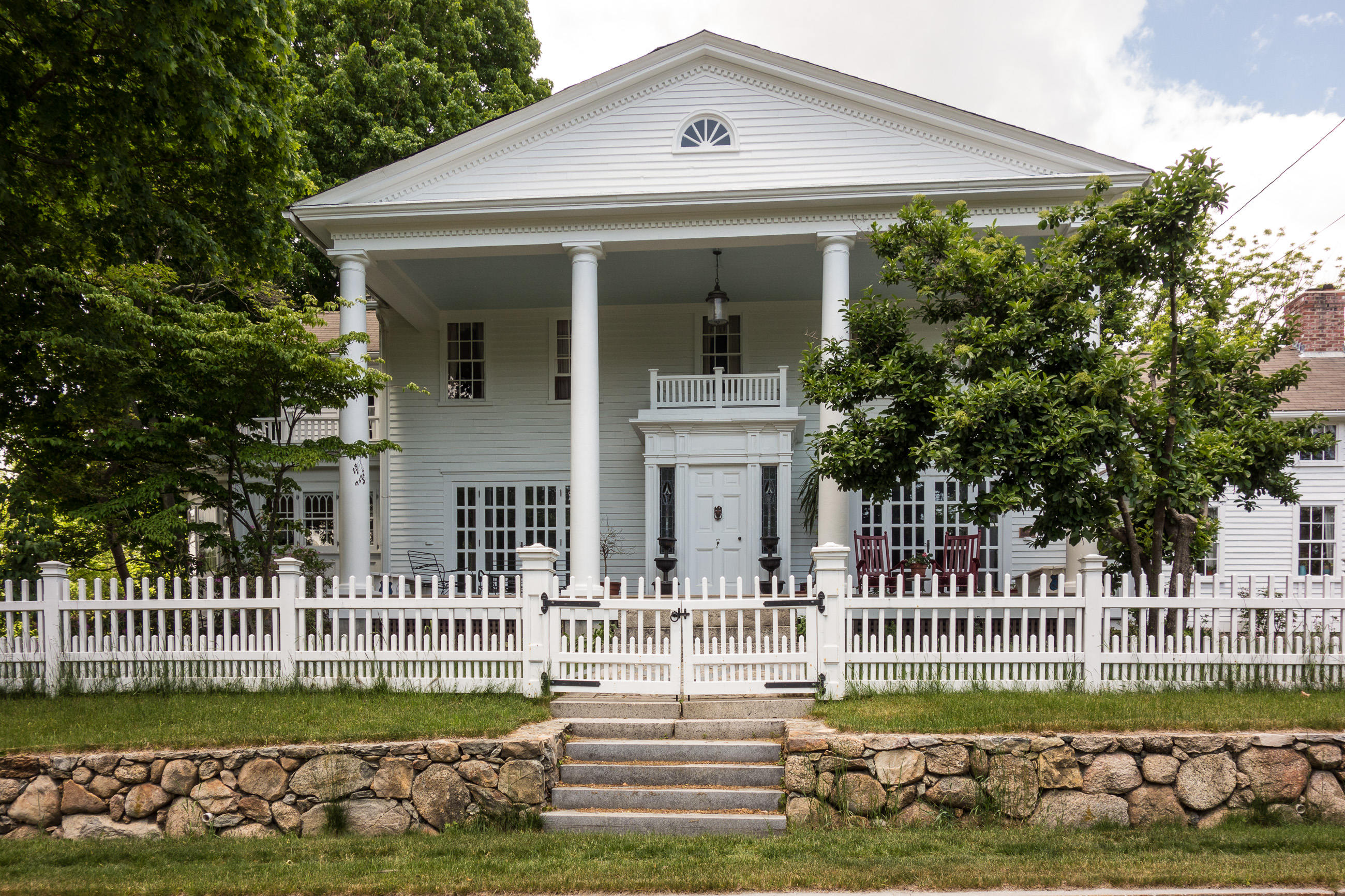
- West Winds viewed from road in 2014

- Location within Rhode Island Location within the United States
- Location: 300 Wakefield Street, West Warwick, Rhode Island
- Coordinates: 41°43′30″N 71°30′52″W
- Built: c. 1740
- Architectural style: Colonial Revival, Greek Revival, Federal
- NRHP reference No.: 93000425
- Added to NRHP: May 20, 1993

West Winds, also known as the Burlingame-Quinn House, is a historic home in West Warwick, Rhode Island. The site was built c. 1740 and added to the National Register of Historic Places in 1993.

The house seems to have been built between 1736 and 1753, probably c.1740. At the time of purchase by George Burlingame (1777-1872) in 1819, the property encompassed 270 acres (110 ha) of farmland. In 1921 it was bought by Robert E. Quinn, a Rhode Island state senator, lieutenant governor, governor, and judge. It was Quinn who christened the property "West Winds". The building has been extensively renovated and expanded several times during its history. Much of the original farmland still surrounds the property as a golf course.

== See also ==
- National Register of Historic Places listings in Kent County, Rhode Island
