= District Four School =

- U.S. National Register of Historic Places
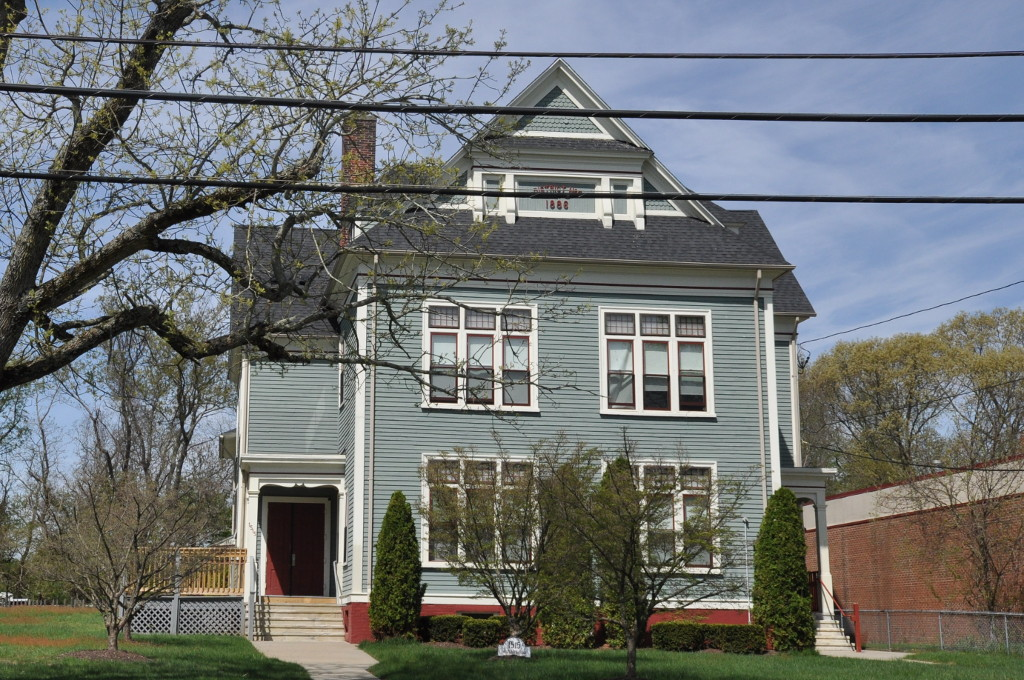

- Location within Rhode Island Location within the United States
- Location: Warwick, Rhode Island
- Coordinates: 41°42′26″N 71°23′02″W
- Built: 1886
- Architect: William R. Walker & Son
- Architectural style: Late Victorian
- NRHP reference No.: 97000318
- Added to NRHP: April 14, 1997

The District Four School is an historic school at 1515 West Shore Road in Warwick, Rhode Island, United States. The 2 1/2-story wood-frame building was designed by William R. Walker of Providence, and built in 1886. It is the oldest surviving school building in the city. It was used as a public school until c. 1940, and was either vacant or occupied by social service agencies in the following decades. It has been converted to residential use.

The building was listed on the National Register of Historic Places in 1997.

== See also ==
- National Register of Historic Places listings in Kent County, Rhode Island
