= Oliver A. Wickes House =

Historic house in Rhode Island, United States

- U.S. National Register of Historic Places
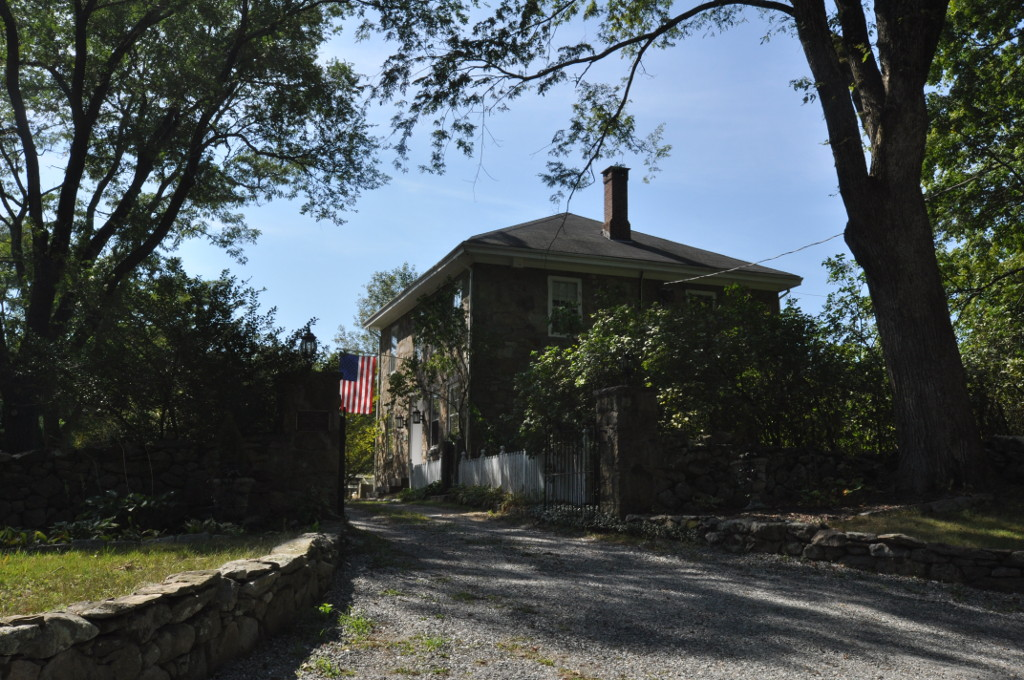

- Location within Rhode Island Location within the United States
- Location: 794 Major Potter Road, Warwick, Rhode Island
- Coordinates: 41°40′26″N 71°29′11″W
- Built: 1855
- Architectural style: Greek Revival, Federal
- MPS: Warwick MRA
- NRHP reference No.: 83000177
- Added to NRHP: August 18, 1983

The Oliver A. Wickes House is a historic house in Warwick, Rhode Island. The two-story stone structure was built in 1855 in a vernacular Federal/Greek Revival transitional style. The house is the only known period stone house in Warwick, and one of a very small number in the state. It has a four-bay main facade with a recessed entry framed by sidelights and a transom window.

The house was listed on the National Register of Historic Places in 1983.

== See also ==
- National Register of Historic Places listings in Kent County, Rhode Island
