= Greenwich Cove Site =

Archaeological site in Rhode Island, US

- U.S. National Register of Historic Places
- Location within Rhode Island Location within the United States
- Location: Southern end of Greenwich Cove, Warwick, Rhode Island
- Coordinates: 41°38′48″N 71°27′2.4″W
- NRHP reference No.: 80000077
- Added to NRHP: January 4, 1980

The Greenwich Cove Site is a prehistoric archaeological site in Warwick, Rhode Island, US. The site is a significant multi-component site, with finds dating from the Late Archaic to the Middle Woodland Period. It notably includes a shell midden that has only been moderately affected by vandalism and development; these are particularly rare in coastal Rhode Island. The site was added to the National Register of Historic Places in 1980.

== Description ==
The Greenwich Cove site was discovered in 1976, during the construction of a residential subdivision. Test excavations identified a number of features, including a shell midden and a habitation area on a knoll overlooking Narragansett Bay, with a kettlehole nearby as the only source of fresh water. The site was subjected to an extensive salvage excavation in 1979, when it was threatened by complete destruction from the development. Finds at the site include a small number of stone projectile points and scrapers, and a significant number of stone chips, evidence of the manufacture of stone tools.

Test holes were dug into the shell midden, which was determined by be 14 by 16 metres (46 ft × 52 ft) in size. Finds from this area included tempered pottery fragments, stone toolmaking chips, and a few fragments of bone. A nearby test hole also found evidence of fire-hardened stone, and organic remains. At the lowest level of that hole, evidence of a hearth was uncovered, along with bone tools and stone fragments suitable for toolmaking.

A burial of a child aged about seven was also found at the site.

In 1980, the site was listed on the National Register of Historic Places in the hope that doing so would attract resources for a more thorough excavation of the site.

== See also ==
- National Register of Historic Places listings in Kent County, Rhode Island
