= Richard Briggs Farm =

Historic house in Rhode Island, United States

- U.S. National Register of Historic Places
- U.S. Historic district
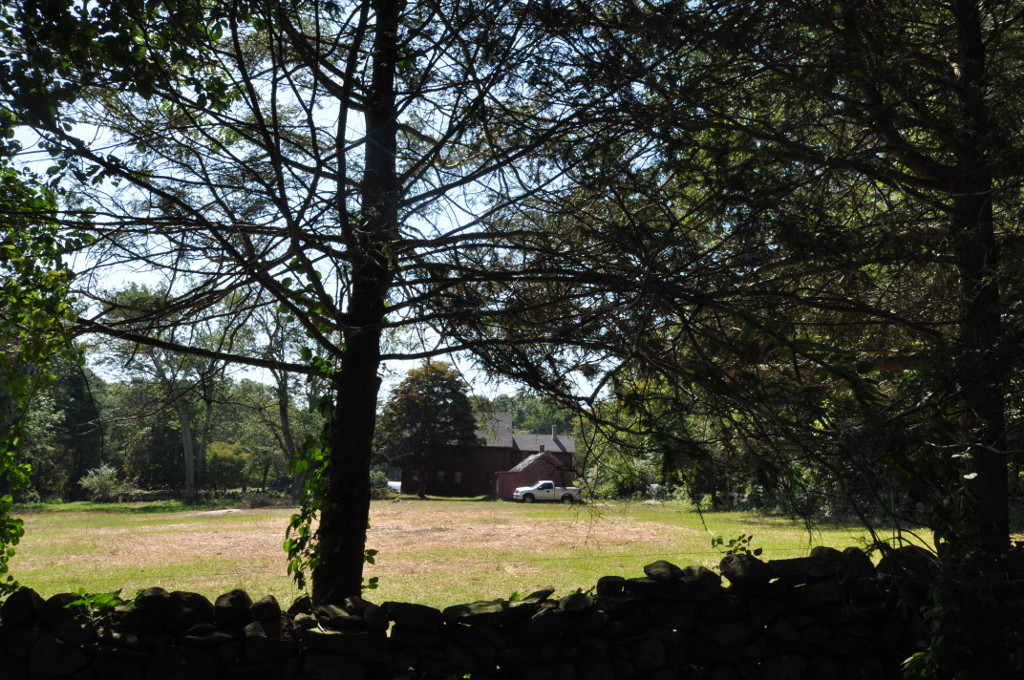

- Location within Rhode Island Location within the United States
- Location: East Greenwich, Rhode Island
- Coordinates: 41°36′25″N 71°30′38″W
- Area: 72 acres (29 ha)
- Built: 1735
- Architectural style: Colonial
- NRHP reference No.: 03000517
- Added to NRHP: June 6, 2003

The Richard Briggs Farm is a historic farm at 830 South Road in East Greenwich, Rhode Island. The 72-acre (29 ha) farm, established in 1704 by Richard Briggs (1675-1733) on land given to him by his father, who had acquired it in the 1670s. The farm is one of the oldest in the town, and is one of its few remaining farms that are still largely intact. Construction of the core of the main house, a 2 1/2-story timber-frame structure with a large central chimney, was traditionally ascribed to Briggs, but architectural evidence suggests it was built c. 1735–55, probably by Briggs' son John (1708-1797) after his father's death. This structure has had two major additions, an ell to the west built c. 1820–50, and a northern ell built in the 1930s and further extended in following decades. The property includes a barn which may be contemporaneous to the original house.

The farm was listed on the National Register of Historic Places in 2003.

== See also ==
- National Register of Historic Places listings in Kent County, Rhode Island
