= Fry's Hamlet Historic District =

Historic district in Rhode Island, United States

- U.S. National Register of Historic Places
- U.S. Historic district
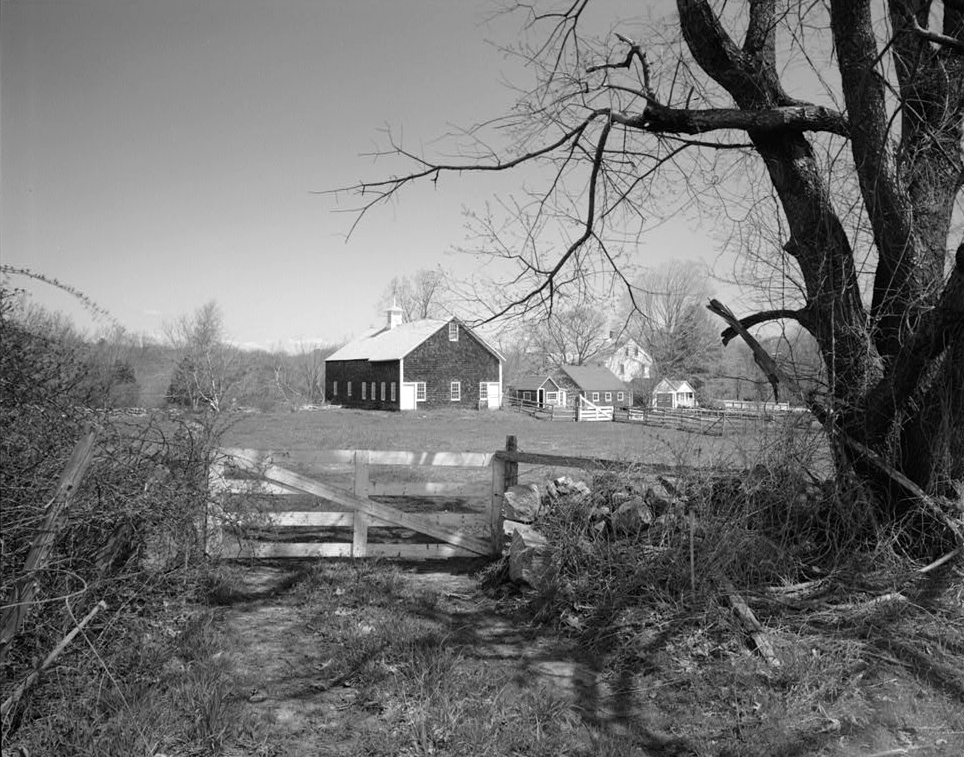

- Location within Rhode Island Location within the United States
- Location: 2068, 2153, 2196, and 2233 South County Trail, East Greenwich, Rhode Island
- Coordinates: 41°38′15″N 71°29′40″W
- Area: 272 acres (110 ha)
- Built: 1735
- Architectural style: Greek Revival, Federal
- NRHP reference No.: 85003161
- Added to NRHP: December 20, 1985

Fry's Hamlet Historic District is a historic district in East Greenwich, Rhode Island. The district encompasses about 272 acres (110 ha) of a predominantly rural and agricultural landscape. The central characteristic of the district is a cluster of three farmsteads, including four primary dwellings, four barns, and numerous additional outbuildings. Three of the four houses were built in the 18th century, and are associated with the Fry and Spencer families that long farmed this area.

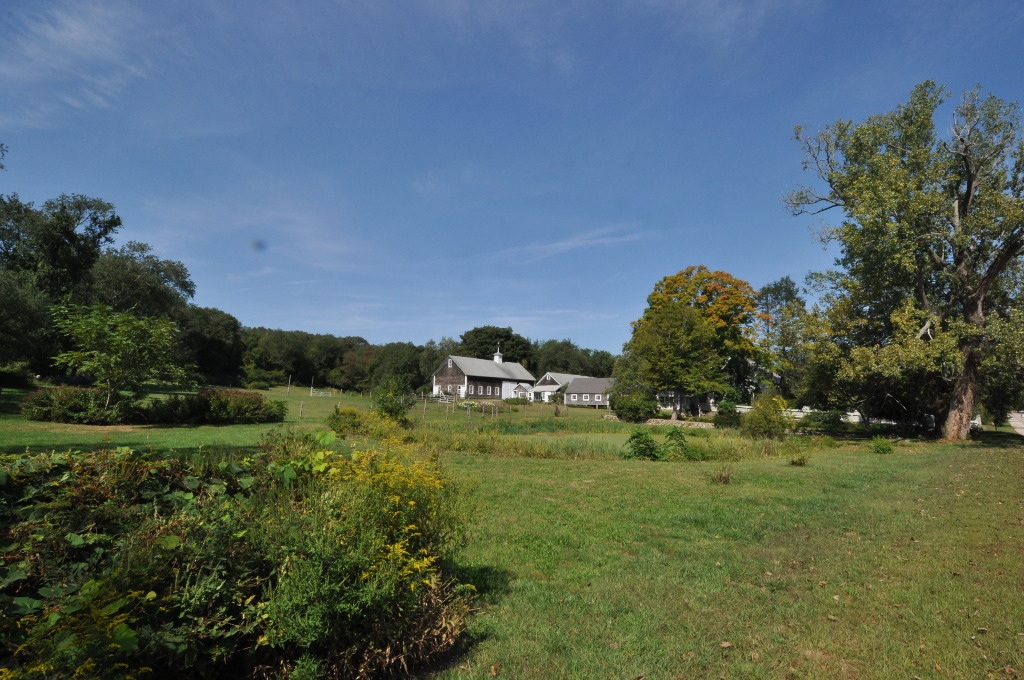

The district was listed on the National Register of Historic Places in 1985.

== See also ==
- National Register of Historic Places listings in Kent County, Rhode Island
