= Budlong Farm =

Historic house in Rhode Island, United States

- U.S. National Register of Historic Places
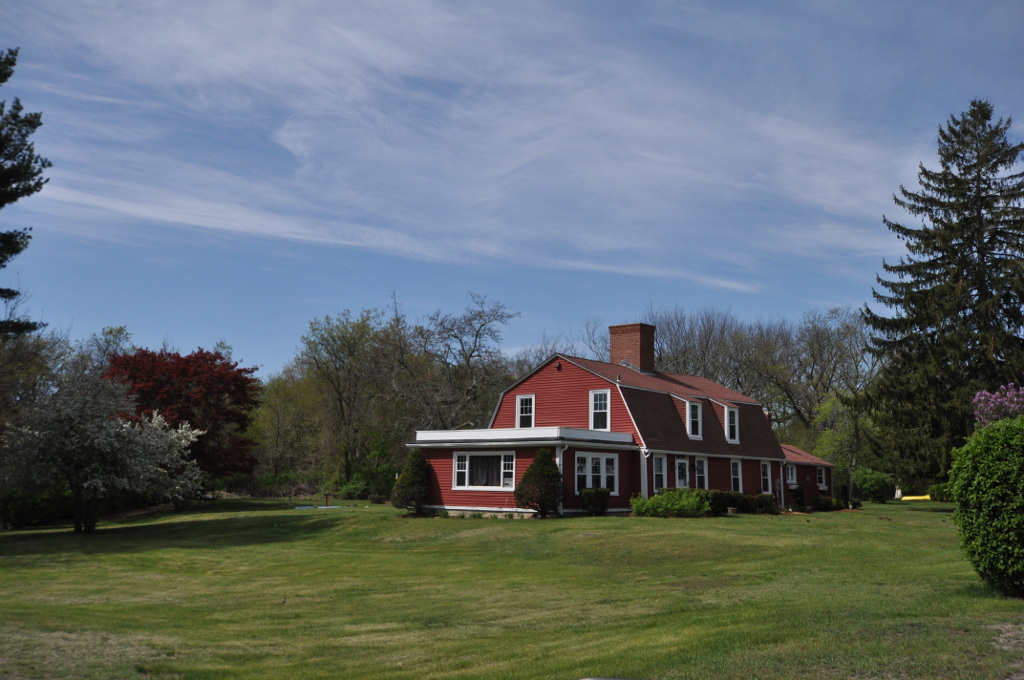

- Location within Rhode Island Location within the United States
- Location: 595 Buttonwoods Avenue, Warwick, Rhode Island
- Coordinates: 41°41′24″N 71°25′38″W
- Area: 5.1 acres (2.1 ha)
- Architectural style: Colonial
- MPS: Warwick MRA
- NRHP reference No.: 83000165
- Added to NRHP: August 18, 1983

Budlong Farm is a historic farmhouse in Warwick, Rhode Island. It is a 1 1/2-story wood-frame house with a gambrel roof and a large central chimney. Its current entrance is asymmetrically placed on the north facade, although the original main entry was on the south side. The house was probably built sometime between 1700 and 1720 by John Budlong, whose family was one of the first to settle in the area after King Philip's War. The property is a rare local example of architecture that has survived from that period.

The house was listed on the National Register of Historic Places in 1983.

== See also ==
- National Register of Historic Places listings in Kent County, Rhode Island
