= Meadows Archeological District =

Historic district in Rhode Island, United States

- U.S. National Register of Historic Places
- U.S. Historic district
- Nearest city: Warwick, Rhode Island
- Area: 3 acres (1.2 ha)
- NRHP reference No.: 83003800
- Added to NRHP: November 3, 1983

The Meadows Archeological District is a complex of four prehistoric archaeological sites in Warwick, Rhode Island. Discovered in 1980, the sites exhibit properties associated with the procurement and processing of stone tools. Three of the four sites include evidence of short-term habitation, and all four have shell middens. Occupation periods from the Archaic to the Woodland Period have been assigned to them. The district was added to the National Register of Historic Places in 1982, cited for its potential to yield new information about prehistoric Native patterns of living.

== Description ==
The Meadows complex consists of four separate sites which abut each other, on a property that has been owned by a single family since the 18th century. The most prominent feature of each site is a shell midden, with three of them exhibiting signs of habitation. The sites were designated 253A-D when they were discovered during a state-funded survey in 1980, at which time a two-phase excavation of the sites was made.

Site 253A is a small site, whose midden is 10 centimetres (3.9 in) thick, and included fragments of a bone awl. The site yielded sufficient material to provide evidence of occupation between the Late Archaic and the Woodland period. It is interpreted as a temporary procurement and processing site. Site 253B is larger, covering 1.5 hectares (3.7 acres), including a midden, fire-cracked rock suggestive of a hearth, and a significant amount of stone toolmaking debitage. 253C is 1.1 hectares (2.7 acres) in size, and contained a stylistic diversity of stone points. Site 253D is a small partially eroded midden, with a variety of scattered artifacts.

== See also ==
- National Register of Historic Places listings in Kent County, Rhode Island
