= Cowesett Pound =

- U.S. National Register of Historic Places
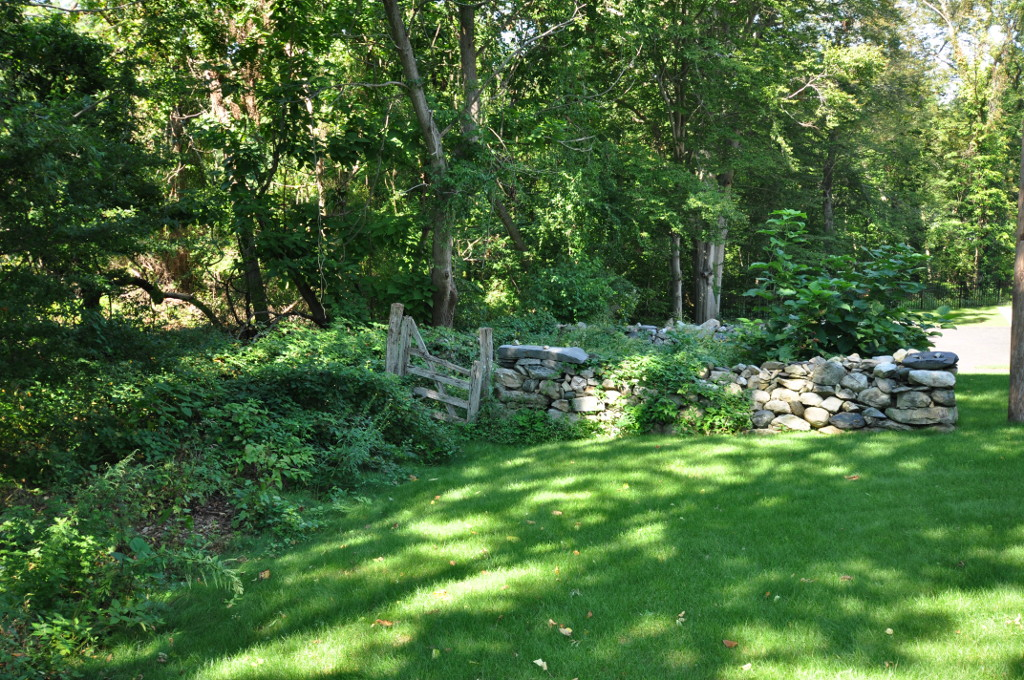

- Location within Rhode Island Location within the United States
- Location: Warwick, Rhode Island
- Coordinates: 41°41′8″N 71°27′44″W
- Built: 1742
- Architect: David Greene
- NRHP reference No.: 87000994
- Added to NRHP: September 4, 1987

The Cowesett Pound is an historic animal pound on Cowesett Road in Warwick, Rhode Island. The pound, a roughly square structure built of unmortared fieldstone four to five feet in height, is estimated to have been built in 1742 by David Greene, although there was an older (probably wooden) pound already at the site. Its walls were probably once topped by capstones, but only one of these survives. The entrance to the pound has a wooden gate added during a 20th-century restoration.

The pound was listed on the National Register of Historic Places in 1987.

== See also ==
- National Register of Historic Places listings in Kent County, Rhode Island
