= Greenwich Mills =

- U.S. National Register of Historic Places
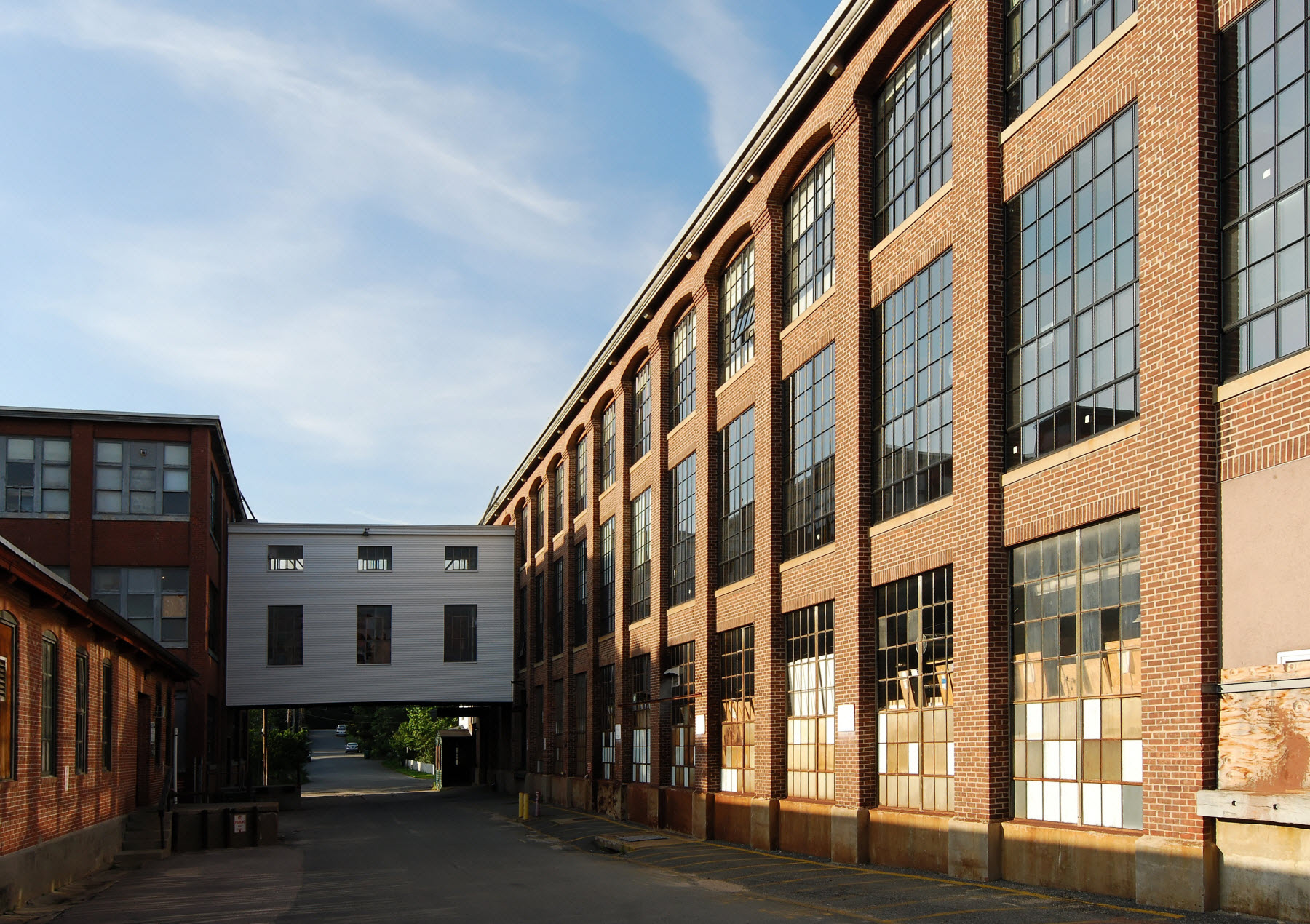

- Location within Rhode Island Location within the United States
- Location: Warwick, Rhode Island
- Coordinates: 41.66492°N 71.44715°W
- Area: 4 acres (1.6 ha)
- Built: 1918-1947
- Built by: O. D. Purington & Co.
- Architect: T. Clarence Herrmann
- NRHP reference No.: 06001151
- Added to NRHP: December 20, 2006

The Greenwich Mills is an historic mill complex at 42 Ladd Street in Warwick, Rhode Island. The complex was developed between 1918 and 1927, and includes four brick structures. The oldest is the weave shed, a single-story structure built in 1918. The office building was built in 1919–20, and is a 3- and 4-story C-shaped structure. This building was designed by Providence architect T. Clarence Herrmann. The finishing mill, built in 1923 and expanded in 1931, is the largest of the complex, and is located at the corner of Blackmore and Ladd Streets. The dye house and boiler house is a single-story structure built in sections in c. 1922 and 1947. The mills were built on a site where industrial activity had been taking place since about 1836. The mills produced worsted wool fabric until 1950, and are now used for a variety of light industrial purposes.

The mill was listed on the National Register of Historic Places in 2006.

== See also ==
- National Register of Historic Places listings in Kent County, Rhode Island
