= Trafalgar Site, RI-639 =

- U.S. National Register of Historic Places
- Location: Warwick, Rhode Island
- NRHP reference No.: 83003801
- Added to NRHP: November 3, 1983

Trafalgar Site, RI-639 is a prehistoric archaeological site in Warwick, Rhode Island. The site's primary component is a shell midden. Finds at the site include stone tools, bone, and tools for working bone.

The site was listed on the National Register of Historic Places in 1983.

== See also ==
- National Register of Historic Places listings in Kent County, Rhode Island
