= Elizabeth Spring =

Water source in Rhode Island, USA

- U.S. National Register of Historic Places
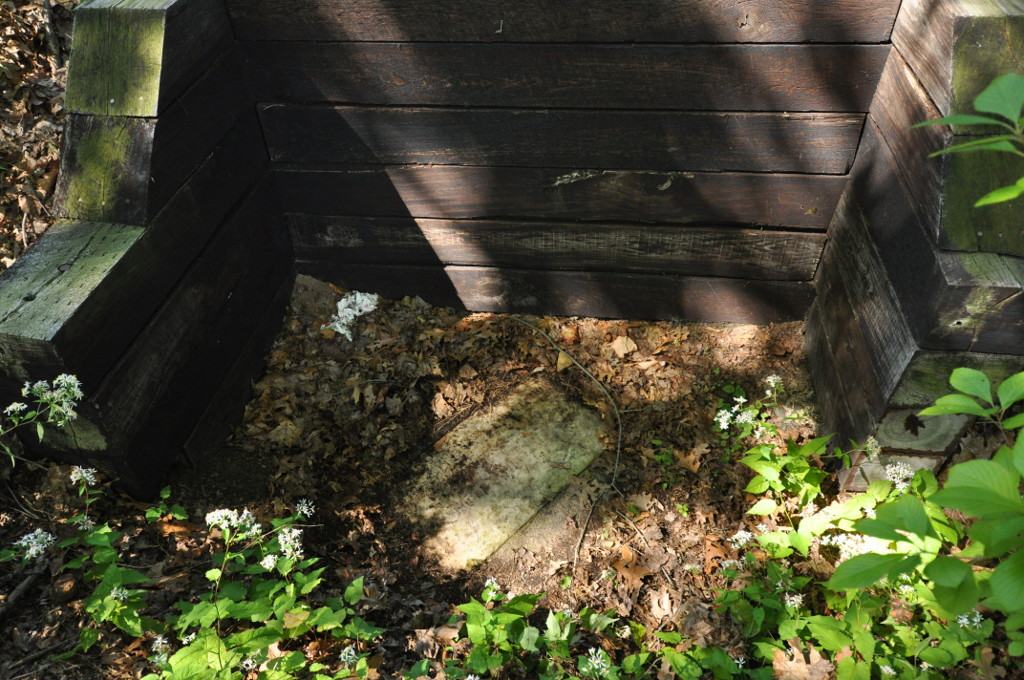

- Location within Rhode Island Location within the United States
- Location: Warwick, Rhode Island
- Coordinates: 41°38′51″N 71°27′25″W
- Built: 1858
- MPS: Warwick MRA
- NRHP reference No.: 83000166
- Added to NRHP: August 18, 1983

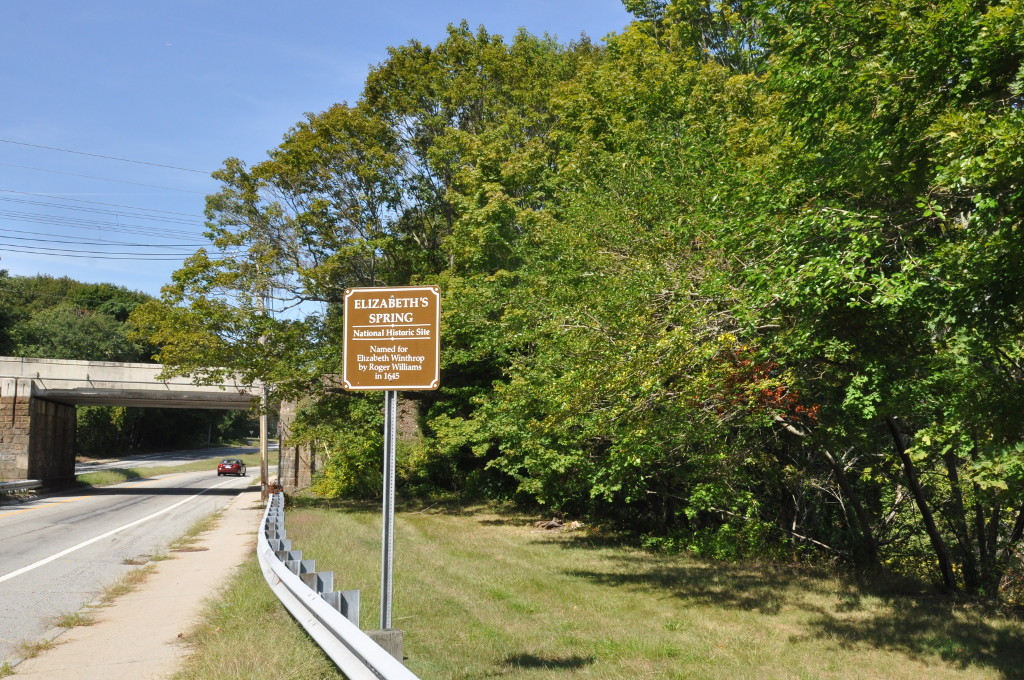
View from the road toward the spring

Elizabeth Spring (or Elizabeth's Spring) is an historic water source in Warwick, Rhode Island. The spring is mentioned in the writings of Rhode Island founder Roger Williams, specifically in reference to Elizabeth, the wife of John Winthrop, Jr., with whom he visited the spring. The spring is located on an embankment east of the railroad tracks and just north of Old Forge Road at the head of Greenwich Cove. Its location, which is not readily visible from the road, is marked by a circular millstone, on which a marble slab with a now-illegible inscription was mounted in 1858.

The spring site was listed on the National Register of Historic Places in 1983.

== See also ==
- National Register of Historic Places listings in Kent County, Rhode Island
