= John R. Waterman House =

Historic house in Rhode Island, United States

- U.S. National Register of Historic Places
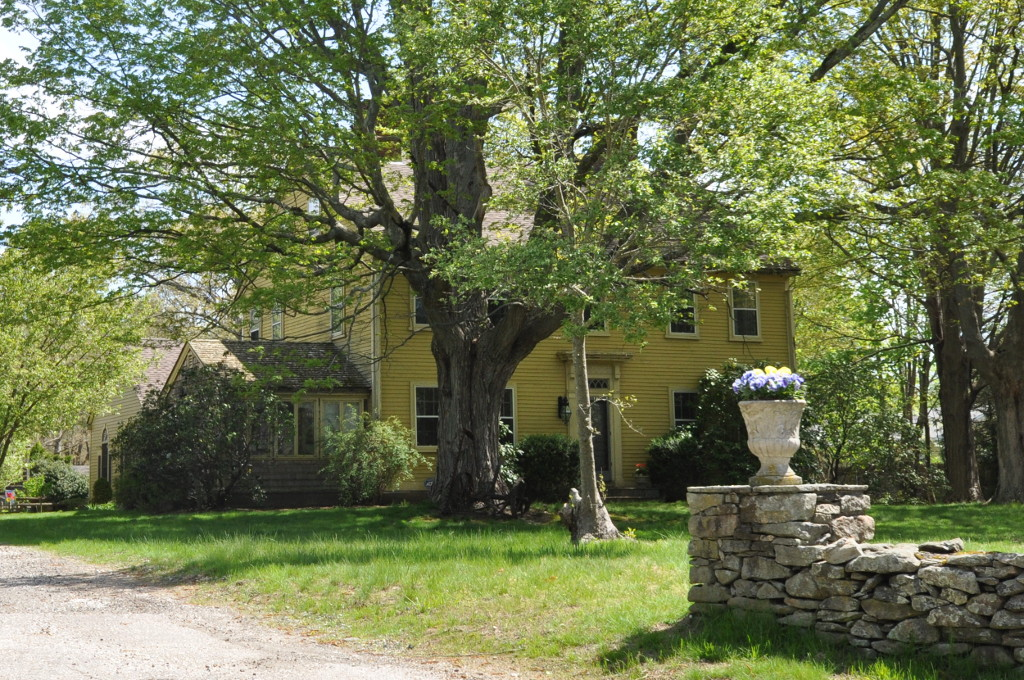

- Location within Rhode Island Location within the United States
- Location: 100 Old Homestead Rd., Warwick, Rhode Island
- Coordinates: 41°43′16″N 71°23′43″W
- Area: 1.3 acres (0.53 ha)
- Built: c. 1800
- Architectural style: Federal
- MPS: Warwick MRA
- NRHP reference No.: 83000176
- Added to NRHP: August 18, 1983

The John R. Waterman House is an historic house at 100 Old Homestead Road in Warwick, Rhode Island. The 2 1/2-story wood-frame house was built c. 1800 by John R. Waterman, a prominent local farmer and politician. Waterman played a significant role in what became known as Dorr's Rebellion, an ultimately successful attempt to force liberalizing changes to the state constitution. The house is an excellent local example of Federal style, and is locally distinct for its use of paired interior chimneys instead of a large central one.

The house was listed on the National Register of Historic Places in 1983.

== John Robinson Waterman ==
John Robinson Waterman (1783-1876) was a descendant of Richard Waterman, one of Warwick's early landholders. He was the grandson of Col. John Waterman (ca. 1730 - June 11, 1812) who served in Warwick's units of the Rhode Island Militia and the son of "Deacon" John Waterman.

He joined the family's leather business. When he became a partner with his father in the tannery in 1808 it was renamed John Waterman Jr. & Son. He served in the Rhode Island legislature from 1821 to 1828. He supported legislation for public schools and suffrage without a property owning requirement.

Also off Old Homestead Road is the Waterman family cemetery. The cemetery has the graves of Col. Benoni Waterman and several dozen family descendants. A cemetery for slaves belonging to members of the family is also located in the area.

== See also ==
- National Register of Historic Places listings in Kent County, Rhode Island
