= Silas Clapp House =

Historic house in Rhode Island, US

- U.S. National Register of Historic Places
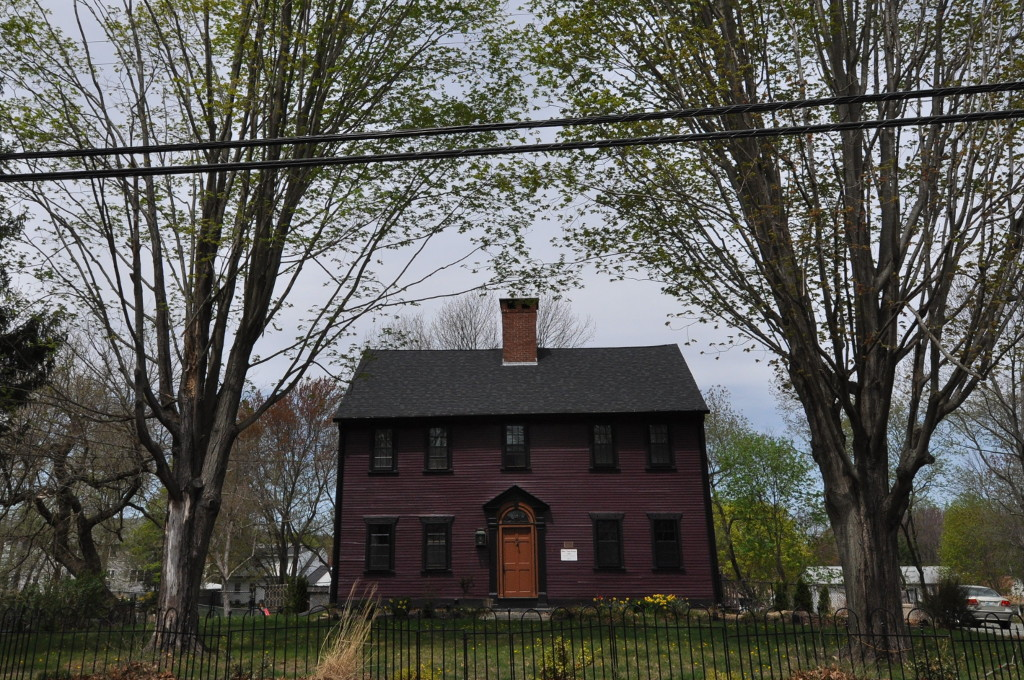

- Location within Rhode Island Location within the United States
- Location: West Warwick, Rhode Island
- Coordinates: 41°40′25″N 71°30′49″W
- Built: c. 1797-1804
- Architectural style: Federal architecture
- NRHP reference No.: 73000049
- Added to NRHP: May 7, 1973

The Silas Clapp House is an historic house at East Greenwich Avenue in West Warwick, Rhode Island. The 2 1/2-story wood-frame house was built around 1797–1804 by Silas Clapp, who farmed a 100-acre (40 ha) parcel of land surrounding the house. It was thought to be built in 1804, but newspapers found in the walls are dated as early as 1797 and many at 1798, suggesting the house was built earlier than previously thought. It is a well-preserved example of vernacular Federal styling, with a five-bay main facade and a central entry with fanlight. There is a large central chimney, a feature more commonly found in older Georgian era homes. Descendants of Clapp owned the property until the 1880s.

The house was listed on the National Register of Historic Places in 1973.

== See also ==
- National Register of Historic Places listings in Kent County, Rhode Island
