= Centreville Mill =

- U.S. National Register of Historic Places
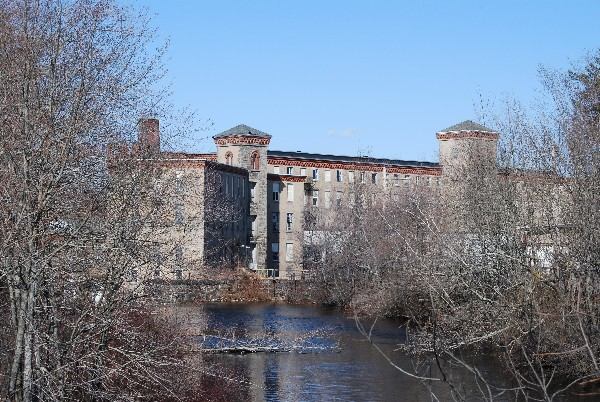
- Centreville Mill

- Location within Rhode Island Location within the United States
- Location: West Warwick, Rhode Island
- Coordinates: 41.69733°N 71.52017°W
- Built: 1861
- NRHP reference No.: 05000582
- Added to NRHP: June 10, 2005

The Centreville Mill is an historic textile mill at 3 Bridal Avenue in West Warwick, Rhode Island. The mill complex is located on a site that has been used for textile processing since 1794, only four years after Samuel Slater's successful mill operation was established in Pawtucket. The oldest surviving buildings on the east side of the Pawtuxet River date to the 1860s.

The mill was listed on the National Register of Historic Places in 2005.

== See also ==
- National Register of Historic Places listings in Kent County, Rhode Island
