= Lambert Farm Site, RI-269 =

- U.S. National Register of Historic Places
- Location: Warwick, Rhode Island
- NRHP reference No.: 83003798
- Added to NRHP: November 03, 1983

The Lambert Farm Site, designated RI-269, was a prehistoric archaeological site in Warwick, Rhode Island, United States. The site consisted of a large shell midden and a dispersed collection of associated stone artifacts at an inland location, which were dated to the Late Woodland Period. The site was examined by professional archaeologists in 1980, and was added to the National Register of Historic Places in 1983 for its potential to reveal information about prehistoric land use patterns. It was destroyed in 1991 by residential development of the area, although significant quantities of archaeological material were recovered prior to its destruction.

== Description ==
The Lambert Farm Site was located in Warwick, Rhode Island, in the coastal plains above Narragansett Bay. Its principal feature was a shell midden, which had only been slightly damaged by agricultural activity in the area at the time of its discovery. The midden includes remains of shellfish, bone, and ceramics, and is surrounded by a collection of stone artifacts. The area has been known to be of prehistoric significance since at least 1897, but was only first surveyed by professional archaeologists in 1980. This survey determined the extent of the most intensive prehistoric activity at the site, and provided dating of the site to the Late Woodland Period.

The site was one of a small number of inland middens known in the state. It was deemed significant because it was relatively unaltered, despite surface-level plow damage. It was believed, at the time of its listing on the National Register, that evidence of habitation (post holes and hearths) might be found below the plow zone, or under the midden itself, were it to be more fully excavated. Further investigation of the site was expected to yield additional information about subsistence, habitation, and migration patterns in the region.

The area where the site was located was slated for development in 1991, and the developer agreed to delay construction work on a 1-hectare (2.5-acre) area surrounding the site, in which salvage archaeology could be performed. This work recovered more than 1,300 kilograms (2,900 lb) of shells, considered somewhat unusual because the site was more than 1.5 kilometres (0.93 mi) from the bay. Also found at the site were the prehistoric burial sites of one adult dog and two puppies, dated to c. 800 BCE. The site's bounds were also found to be larger than previously thought, with the finds indicating evidence of year-round habitation.

== See also ==
- National Register of Historic Places listings in Kent County, Rhode Island
