= Capt. Oliver Gardiner House =

Historic house in Rhode Island, United States

- U.S. National Register of Historic Places
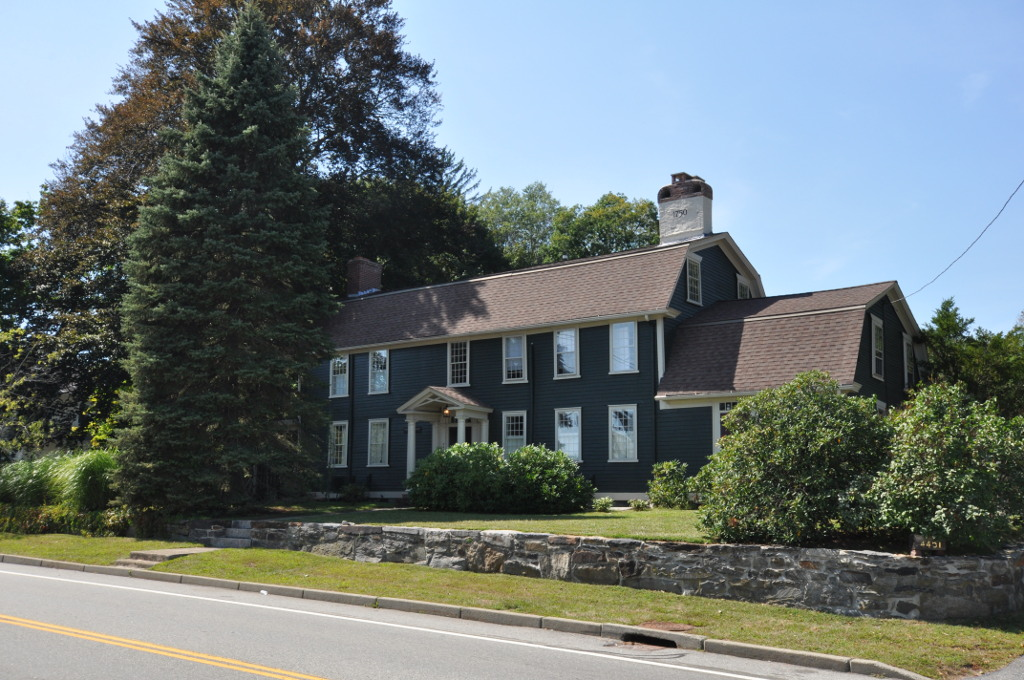

- Location within Rhode Island Location within the United States
- Location: 4451 Post Road, Warwick, Rhode Island
- Coordinates: 41°40′10″N 71°26′57″W
- Built: 1750
- Architectural style: Colonial
- MPS: Warwick MRA
- NRHP reference No.: 83000167
- Added to NRHP: August 18, 1983

Captain Oliver Gardiner House is a historic house prominently located in Warwick, Rhode Island. Built about 1750, it is a 2 1/2-story wood-frame structure with a gambrel roof. Its main facade has six irregularly-spaced bays, with a centrally positioned entrance. The house is unusual for its period in that it has a large central hallway, a feature not commonly seen until the Federal period. Oliver Gardiner, its first owner, was a ship's captain.

The house was listed on the National Register of Historic Places in 1983.

== See also ==
- National Register of Historic Places listings in Kent County, Rhode Island
