= Richard Wickes Greene House =

Historic house in Rhode Island, United States

- U.S. National Register of Historic Places
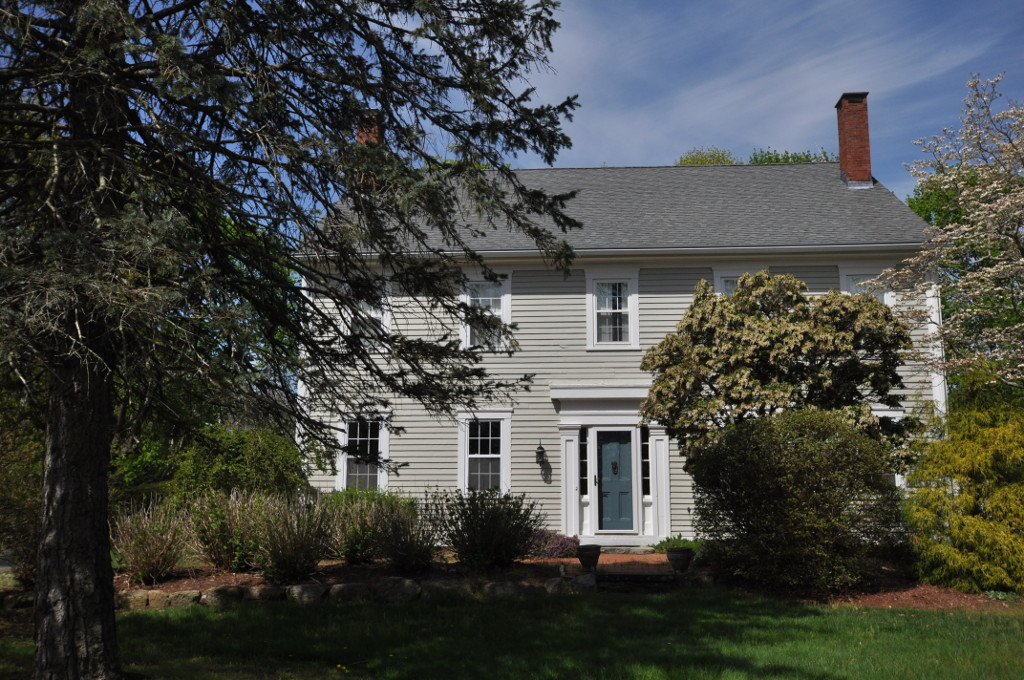

- Location within Rhode Island Location within the United States
- Location: 27 Homestead Ave., Warwick, Rhode Island
- Coordinates: 41°40′52″N 71°22′47″W
- Built: 1849
- Architectural style: Georgian
- MPS: Warwick MRA
- NRHP reference No.: 83000171
- Added to NRHP: August 18, 1983

The Richard Wickes Greene House is an historic house in Warwick, Rhode Island. The 2 1/2-story wood-frame house was built in 1849, and is an excellent local example of Georgian style. Richard Wickes Greene was a ship's captain who acquired the property from the Wickes family in 1826.

The house was listed on the National Register of Historic Places in 1983.

== See also ==
- National Register of Historic Places listings in Kent County, Rhode Island
