= Phenix Baptist Church =

Historic church in Rhode Island, United States

- Formerly listed on the U.S. National Register of Historic Places
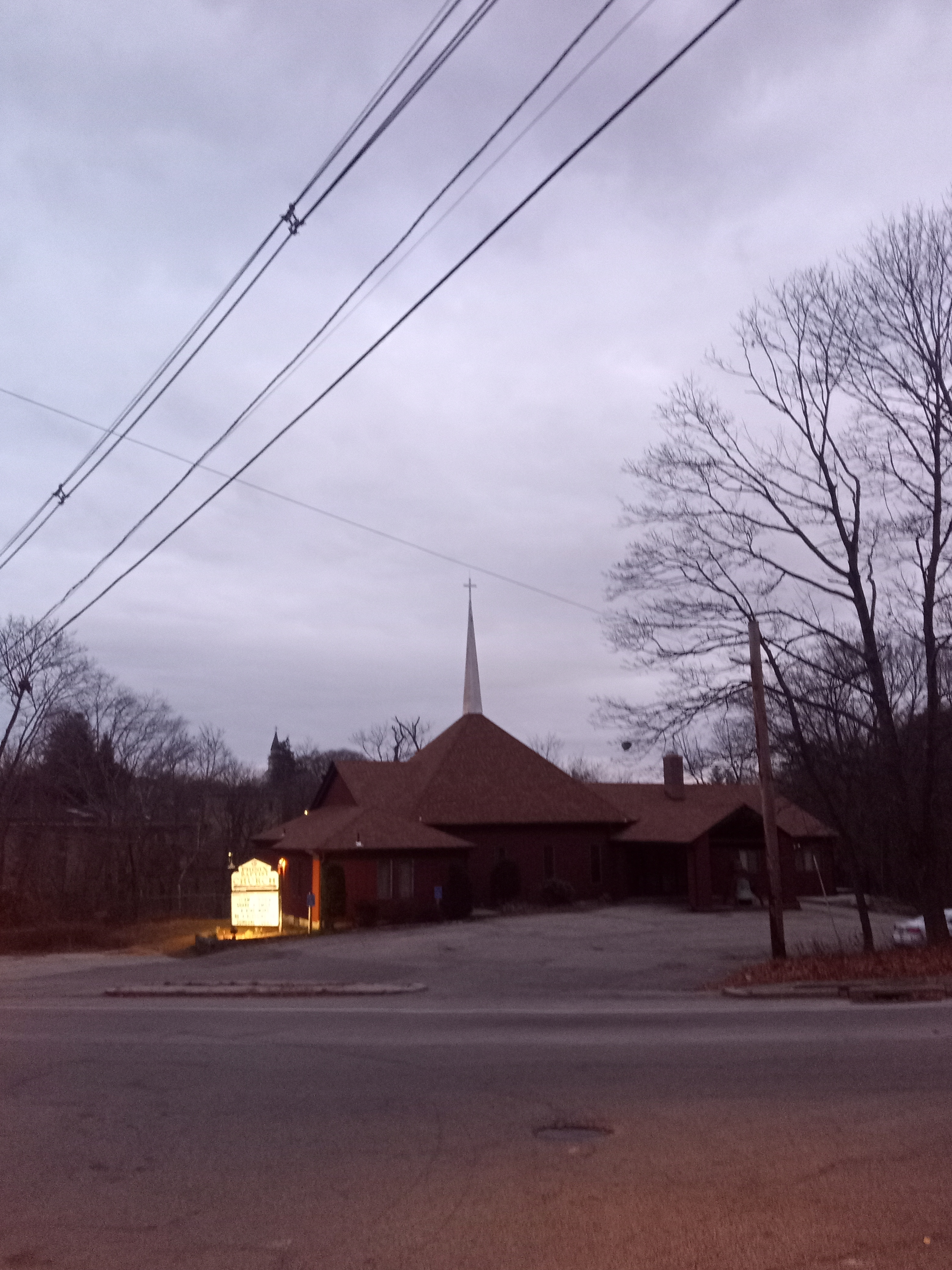

- Location within Rhode Island Location within the United States
- Location: West Warwick, Rhode Island
- Coordinates: 41°43′14″N 71°31′56″W
- Built: 1869
- Architect: Truesdell, Augustus; Post & Truesdell
- Architectural style: Italianate
- NRHP reference No.: 76002272

Significant dates
- Added to NRHP: June 30, 1976
- Removed from NRHP: Unknown

Phenix Baptist Church is a church at 2 Fairview Avenue in West Warwick, Rhode Island, U.S. The church's 1869 building, once listed on the National Register of Historic Places, has been demolished. The church has been rebuilt twice and celebrated its 175th anniversary on January 8, 2017.
