= Caleb Greene House =

Historic house in Rhode Island, United States

- U.S. National Register of Historic Places
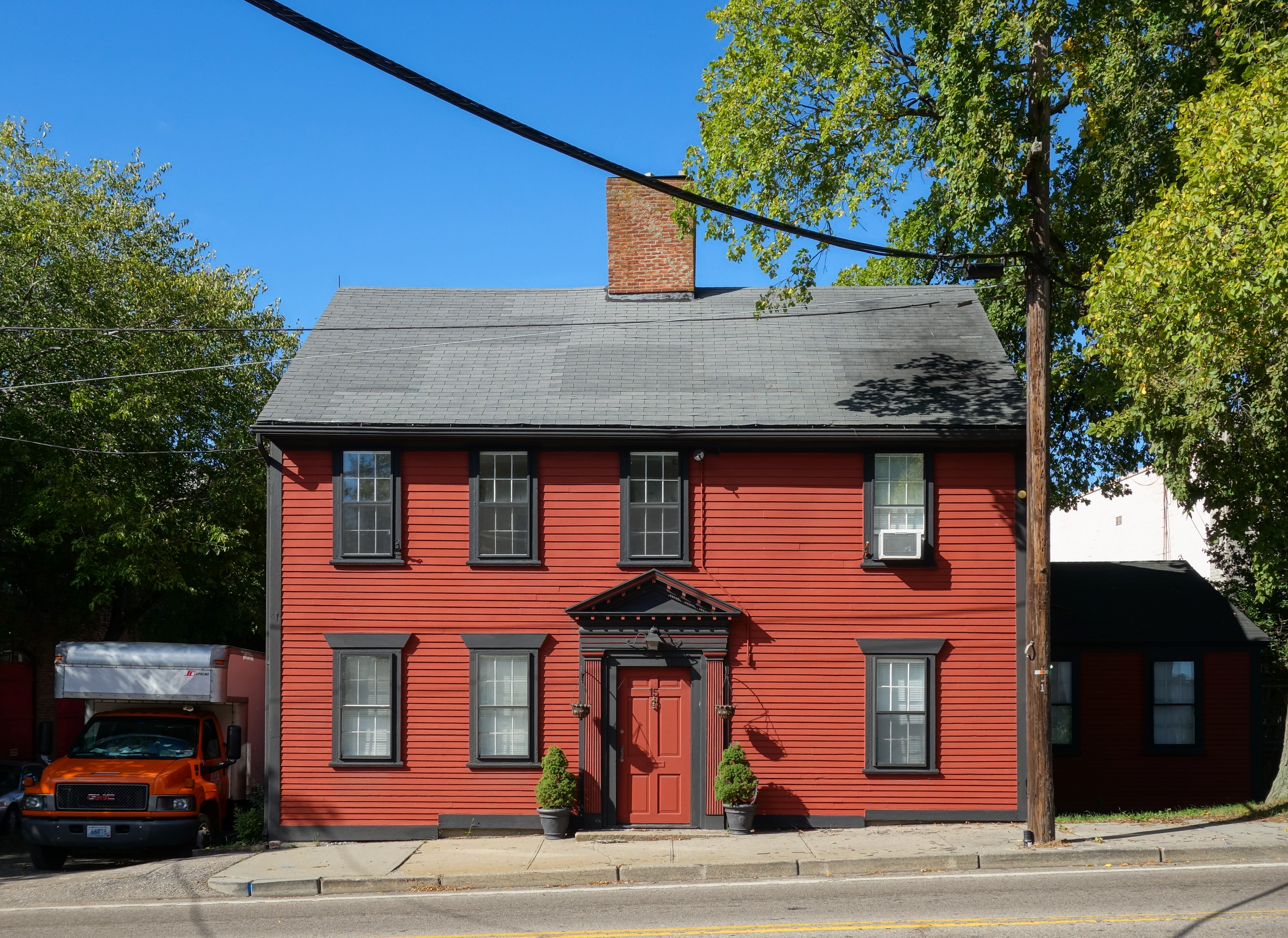
- Caleb Greene House in 2012

- Location within Rhode Island Location within the United States
- Location: 15 Centerville Road, Warwick, Rhode Island
- Coordinates: 41°41′55″N 71°27′39″W
- Built: 1800
- Architectural style: Federal
- NRHP reference No.: 78000063
- Added to NRHP: November 28, 1978

The Caleb Greene House is an historic house in Warwick, Rhode Island.

The 2 1/2-story wood frame Federal era house was built in 1800 by Caleb Greene, a local businessman. Caleb Greene was a cousin to the American Revolutionary War General Nathanael Greene and the father to Major General George Sears Greene, the man credited with holding the right flank of the Union Army on Culp's Hill at the Battle of Gettysburg on July 2, 1863.

The house, one of the better-preserved of the period in the Apponaug area of Warwick, was listed on the National Register of Historic Places in 1978.

== See also ==
- National Register of Historic Places listings in Kent County, Rhode Island
