= Greene–Durfee House =

Historic house in Rhode Island, United States

- U.S. National Register of Historic Places
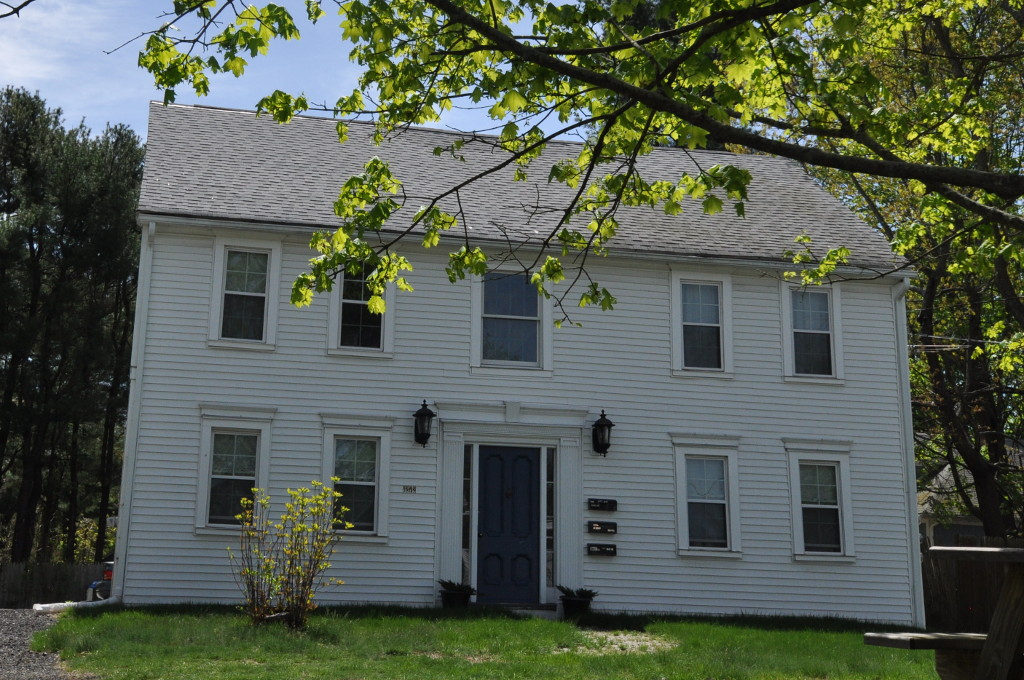

- Location within Rhode Island Location within the United States
- Location: 1272 W. Shore Rd., Warwick, Rhode Island
- Coordinates: 41°42′46″N 71°22′48″W
- Built: c. 1780
- Architectural style: Georgian
- MPS: Warwick MRA
- NRHP reference No.: 83000172
- Added to NRHP: August 18, 1983

The Greene–Durfee House (also Greene–Durffee) is a historic house at 1272 West Shore Road in Warwick, Rhode Island, United States.

== History and architecture ==
The house was built in the late eighteenth century by William Greene (1763–1852), a descendant of John Greene, an original settler of Warwick in 1643. William Greene was a farmer merchant marine and his father, Godfrey Greene (1732–1801), was a mariner and shipmaster. A date of circa 1780 has been given to the house, but Greene likely did not build it until after his marriage in 1796. In 1846 he sold the house to Charles Wells Greene (1850–1857), his only son, who died unmarried. The house was inherited by his sister, Almira (Greene) Durfee (1807–1888), widow of Edward Greene Durfee (1809–1851). It was later acquired by her daughter, Sarah, and her husband John F. Woodmansee. In the early twenty–first century the house was divided into apartments, though this has been reversed.

The house, a 2 1/2-story wood-frame structure with a large central chimney, stands set well back from the west side of the road, opposite Church Avenue and a small cemetery. It is set behind a small wood-frame commercial building and is partially screened from view by bushes. It is one of the city's finest Georgian style houses, with a particularly well-preserved interior.

The house was listed on the National Register of Historic Places in 1983.

== See also ==
- National Register of Historic Places listings in Kent County, Rhode Island
