= Moses Greene House =

Historic house in Rhode Island, United States

- U.S. National Register of Historic Places
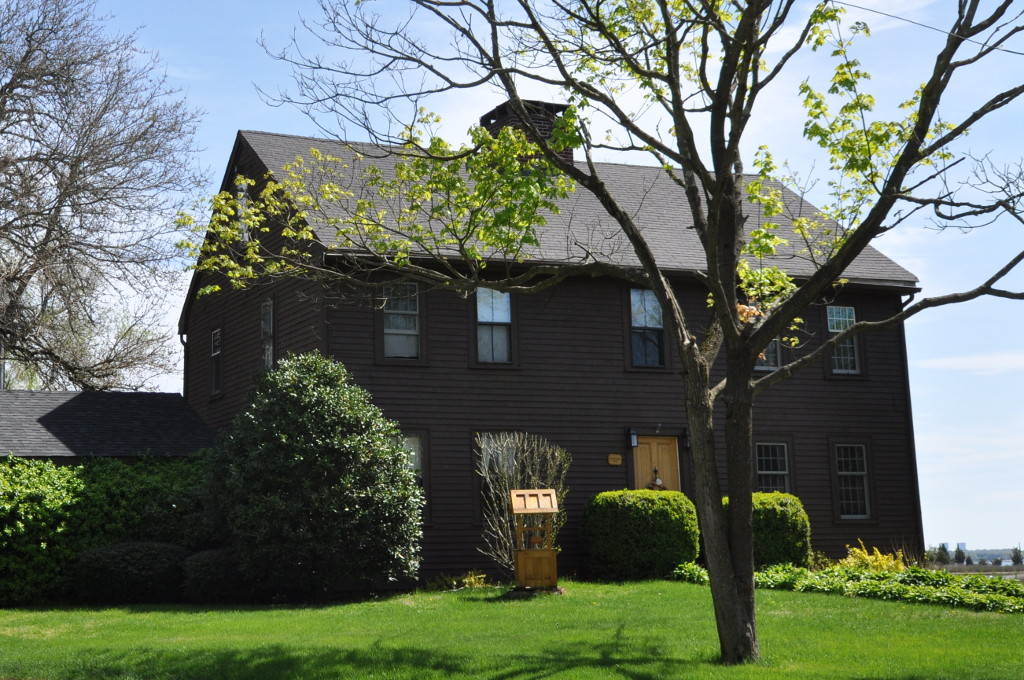

- Location within Rhode Island Location within the United States
- Location: 11 Economy Ave., Warwick, Rhode Island
- Coordinates: 41°42′49″N 71°22′16″W
- Built: 1750
- Architectural style: Colonial
- MPS: Warwick MRA
- NRHP reference No.: 83000169
- Added to NRHP: August 18, 1983

The Moses Greene House is an historic house in Warwick, Rhode Island. It is a 2 1/2-story wood-frame house with a large central chimney, and a rear ell. The main block was built c. 1750, and is one of Warwick's few surviving 18th-century houses. It is located on one of the first sites to be occupied by European settlers in Warwick, near one of its first sawmills. In 1750, Moses Greene built his home where Buckeye Brook meets Mill Cove. The home may have served a role in the Underground Railroad—a secret cellar room is accessed by a stone wall that slides aside on iron tracks. The room may have also been used by rum smugglers. The house was listed on the National Register of Historic Places in 1983.

== See also ==
- National Register of Historic Places listings in Kent County, Rhode Island
