= Spencer–Shippee–Lillbridge House =

Historic house in Rhode Island, United States

- Spencer-Shippee-Lillbridge Farm
- U.S. National Register of Historic Places
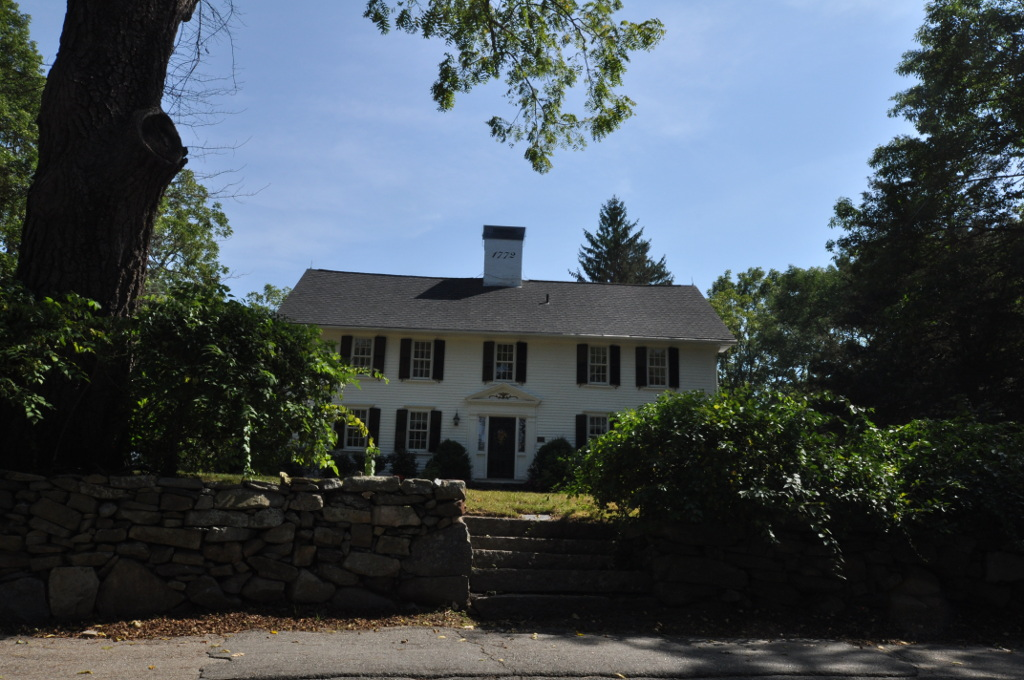

- Location within Rhode Island Location within the United States
- Location: 12 Middle Road, East Greenwich, Rhode Island
- Coordinates: 41.654444°N 71.464167°W
- Area: 1.3 acres (0.53 ha)
- Built: 1772
- Architectural style: Colonial
- NRHP reference No.: 11000207
- Added to NRHP: April 20, 2011

The Spencer–Shippee–Lillbridge House, also known as the Crossways Farm and Walnut Brook Farm, is a historic farmstead at 12 Middle Road in East Greenwich, Rhode Island. The main house is a 2 1/2-story timber-frame structure, five bays wide and three bays deep, whose construction date is traditionally given as 1772. There is, however, architectural evidence that it may be older (c. 1750). The building has a small 19th century addition, whose purpose was to provide a staircase for hired farmhands to reach the attic, where their living space was. The downstairs spaces have retained much of their original Georgian fabric, although a pantry space has been converted into a modern kitchen. There are five outbuildings on the 1.3-acre (0.53 ha) property, including a 19th-century wagon shed and horse barn. The house, once the centerpiece of a 225-acre (91 ha) farm, was held by members of the interrelated Spencer, Shippee, and Lillbridge families from its inception until 2001.

The property was listed on the National Register of Historic Places in 2011.

== See also ==
- National Register of Historic Places listings in Kent County, Rhode Island
