= Christopher Rhodes House =

Historic house in Rhode Island, United States

- U.S. National Register of Historic Places
- U.S. Historic district – Contributing property
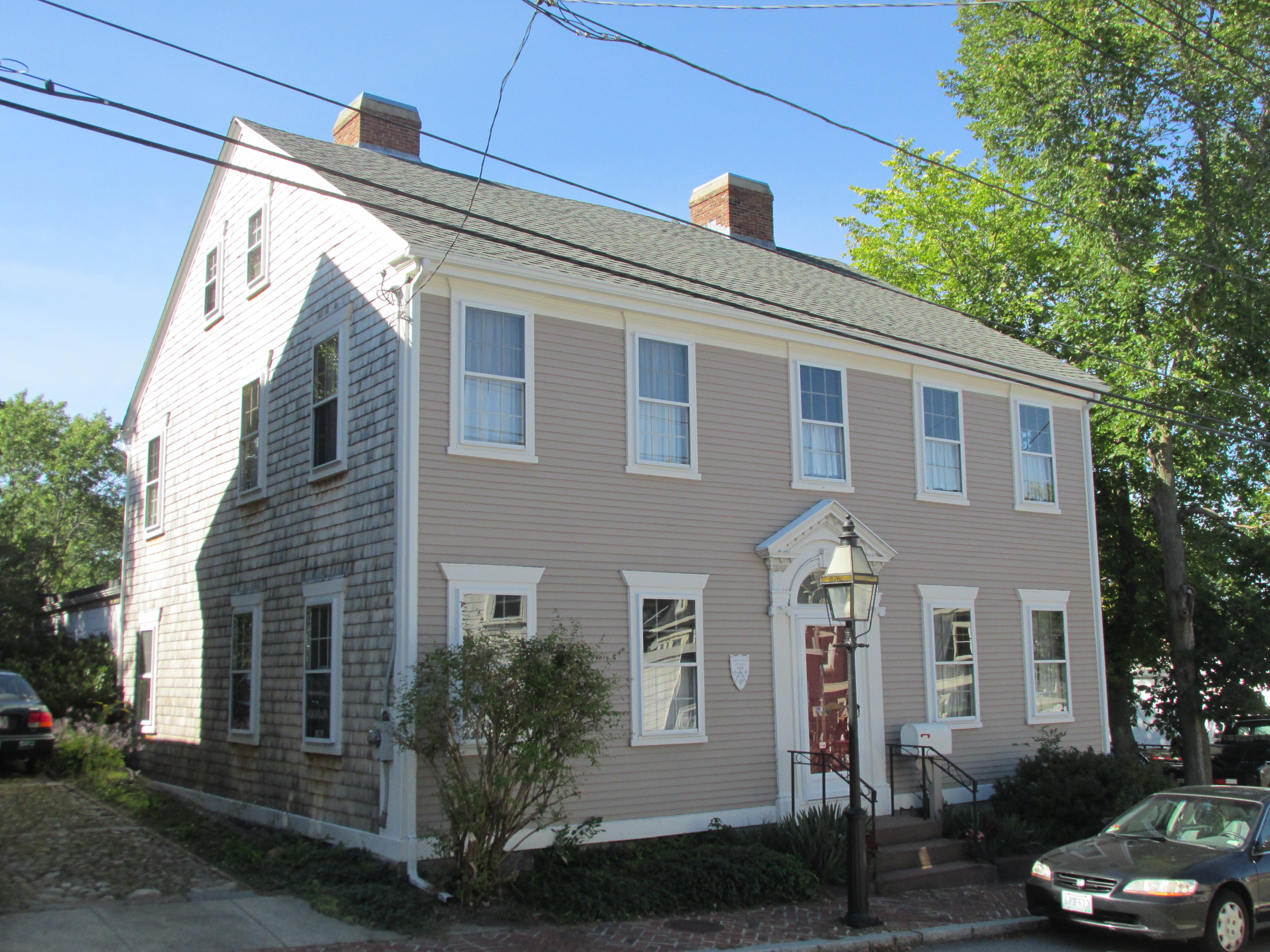
- Christopher Rhodes House

- Location within Rhode Island Location within the United States
- Location: Warwick, Rhode Island
- Coordinates: 41°45′49″N 71°23′29″W
- Built: 1800
- Part of: Pawtuxet Village Historic District (ID73000050)
- NRHP reference No.: 71000015

Significant dates
- Added to NRHP: March 31, 1971
- Designated CP: April 24, 1973

The Christopher Rhodes House is an historic house at 25 Post Road in the Pawtuxet village of Warwick, Rhode Island. The 2 1/2-story timber-frame house was built c. 1800 by Christopher Rhodes, a prominent local businessman and cofounder with his brothers of the Pawtuxet Bank. The house was probably one of the finest Federal style homes of its time in the village, and is now one of the few to survive from that time. It has a side-gable roof, and is five bays wide with a center entry. The entry is topped by a fanlight and moulded architrave, and framed by Ionic pilasters.

The house was listed on the National Register of Historic Places in 1971.

== See also ==
- National Register of Historic Places listings in Kent County, Rhode Island
