= National Register of Historic Places listings in Kent County, Rhode Island =

Location of Kent County in Rhode Island

This is a list of the National Register of Historic Places listings in Kent County, Rhode Island.

This is intended to be a complete list of the properties and districts on the National Register of Historic Places in Kent County, Rhode Island, United States. Latitude and longitude coordinates are provided for many National Register properties and districts; these locations may be seen together in a map.

There are 81 properties and districts listed on the National Register in the county, including 1 National Historic Landmark.

Contents: Counties in Rhode Island

Bristol | Kent | Newport | Providence (Pawtucket | Providence (city) | Woonsocket) | Washington

This National Park Service list is complete through NPS recent listings posted May 1, 2026.

This National Park Service list is complete through NPS recent listings posted May 1, 2026.

== Current listings ==
	Name on the Register	Image	Date listed	Location	City or town	Description
1	Stephen Allen House	Stephen Allen House	September 20, 1978 (#78000060)	Sharp St. 41°38′40″N 71°41′30″W	West Greenwich	
2	Anthony Village Historic District	Anthony Village Historic District	September 20, 2010 (#10000770)	Washington St. between Battey Ave. and Hazard St. and various properties on 12 adjacent streets and the Pawtuxet River; 41°41′39″N 71°33′13″W	Coventry	
3	Apponaug Historic District	Apponaug Historic District	February 23, 1984 (#84001833)	3376, 3384, 3387, 3391, 3397-3399, and 3404 Post Rd. 41°38′18″N 71°27′04″W	Warwick	
4	Arctic Mill Historic District	Arctic Mill Historic District	April 4, 2025 (#100011595)	12, 15 21, 33, and 40 Factory Street; 41°42′26″N 71°31′16″W	West Warwick	
5	Arkwright Bridge	Arkwright Bridge	December 12, 1978 (#78000061)	Crosses the Pawtuxet River at Hill St.; closed. 41°43′49″N 71°32′49″W	Coventry	Extends into Providence County
6	Armory of the Kentish Guards	Armory of the Kentish Guards	April 28, 1970 (#70000012)	Armory and Peirce Sts. 41°39′40″N 71°27′04″W	East Greenwich	
7	John Waterman Arnold House	John Waterman Arnold House	September 10, 1971 (#71000013)	11 Roger Williams Ave. 41°45′18″N 71°23′56″W	Warwick	
8	Isaac Bowen House	Isaac Bowen House	June 27, 1980 (#80000076)	Northeast of Coventry on Maple Valley Rd. 41°43′09″N 71°41′53″W	Coventry	
9	Joseph Briggs House-Coventry Town Farm	Joseph Briggs House-Coventry Town Farm	June 18, 1987 (#87000997)	Town Farm Rd. 41°42′30″N 71°36′55″W	Coventry	
10	Richard Briggs Farm	Richard Briggs Farm	June 6, 2003 (#03000517)	830 South Rd. 41°36′25″N 71°30′38″W	East Greenwich	
11	Budlong Farm	Budlong Farm	August 18, 1983 (#83000165)	595 Buttonwoods Ave. 41°41′24″N 71°25′38″W	Warwick	
12	Buttonwoods Beach Historic District	Buttonwoods Beach Historic District	February 23, 1984 (#84001834)	Roughly bounded by Brush Neck Cove, Greenwich Bay, Cooper and Promenade Aves. 41°41′09″N 71°24′49″W	Warwick	
13	Carbuncle Hill Archaeological District, RI-1072-1079		September 28, 1985 (#85002692)	Address Restricted	Coventry	
14	Cedar Hill	Cedar Hill	December 22, 2014 (#14001077)	4157 Post Rd. 41°40′42″N 71°27′10″W	Warwick	Now the Clouds Hill Victorian Museum.
15	Centreville Mill	Centreville Mill	June 10, 2005 (#05000582)	3 Bridal Ave. 41°41′55″N 71°31′15″W	West Warwick	
16	Silas Clapp House	Silas Clapp House	May 7, 1973 (#73000049)	E. Greenwich Ave. 41°40′25″N 71°30′49″W	West Warwick	
17	Conimicut Lighthouse	Conimicut Lighthouse	March 30, 1988 (#88000269)	East of Conimicut Pt. in the Providence River; 41°43′01″N 71°20′45″W	Warwick	
18	Cowesett Pound	Cowesett Pound	September 4, 1987 (#87000994)	Cowesett Rd. 41°41′08″N 71°27′44″W	Warwick	
19	Crompton Free Library	Crompton Free Library	November 20, 1978 (#78000062)	Main St. 41°41′11″N 71°31′23″W	West Warwick	
20	Crompton Mill Historic District	Crompton Mill Historic District	July 14, 2006 (#06000577)	20 Remington St., 53 and 65 Manchester St. 41°41′10″N 71°31′31″W	West Warwick	
21	District Four School	District Four School	April 14, 1997 (#97000318)	1515 W. Shore Rd. 41°42′24″N 71°23′03″W	Warwick	
22	East Greenwich Historic District	East Greenwich Historic District	June 13, 1974 (#74000036)	Roughly bounded by Kenyon Ave., Division, Peirce, and London Sts., Greenwich Cove and Dark Entry Brook; 41°39′43″N 71°27′17″W	East Greenwich and Warwick	
23	Elizabeth Spring	Elizabeth Spring	August 18, 1983 (#83000166)	Off Forge Rd. 41°38′51″N 71°27′25″W	Warwick	
24	Forge Farm	Forge Farm	January 11, 1974 (#74000037)	40 Forge Rd. 41°38′19″N 71°27′06″W	Warwick	
25	Forge Road Historic District	Forge Road Historic District	February 23, 1984 (#84001861)	Forge Rd. from Ives Rd. to the Potowomut River; 41°38′18″N 71°27′04″W	Warwick	
26	Fry's Hamlet Historic District	Fry's Hamlet Historic District	December 20, 1985 (#85003161)	2068, 2153, 2196, and 2233 S. County Trail; 41°38′21″N 71°29′58″W	East Greenwich	
27	Capt. Oliver Gardiner House	Capt. Oliver Gardiner House	August 18, 1983 (#83000167)	4451 Post Rd. 41°40′10″N 71°26′57″W	Warwick	
28	Gaspee Point	Gaspee Point	June 8, 1972 (#72000018)	Off Namquid Dr. 41°44′38″N 71°22′42″W	Warwick	
29	Caleb Gorton House	Caleb Gorton House	August 18, 1983 (#83000168)	987 Greenwich Ave. 41°42′30″N 71°27′53″W	Warwick	
30	Caleb Greene House	Caleb Greene House	November 28, 1978 (#78000063)	15 Centerville Rd. 41°41′55″N 71°27′39″W	Warwick	
31	Christopher Rhodes Greene House	Christopher Rhodes Greene House	August 30, 2007 (#07000891)	2 Potter Court; 41°43′49″N 71°32′25″W	Coventry	
32	Gen. Nathanael Greene Homestead	Gen. Nathanael Greene Homestead	October 7, 1971 (#71000014)	20 Taft St. 41°41′38″N 71°32′36″W	Coventry	
33	Moses Greene House	Moses Greene House	August 18, 1983 (#83000169)	11 Economy Ave. 41°42′49″N 71°22′16″W	Warwick	
34	Peter Greene House	Peter Greene House	August 18, 1983 (#83000170)	1124 W. Shore Rd. 41°42′55″N 71°22′34″W	Warwick	
35	Richard Wickes Greene House	Richard Wickes Greene House	August 18, 1983 (#83000171)	27 Homestead Ave. 41°40′51″N 71°22′49″W	Warwick	
36	Greene-Bowen House	Greene-Bowen House	May 2, 1974 (#74000038)	100 Mill Wheel Rd. 41°41′26″N 71°25′19″W	Warwick	
37	Greene-Durfee House	Greene-Durfee House	August 18, 1983 (#83000172)	1272 W. Shore Rd. 41°42′46″N 71°22′48″W	Warwick	
38	Greenwich Cove Site		January 4, 1980 (#80000077)	Southern end of Greenwich Cove; 41°38′48″N 71°27′02″W	Warwick	
39	Greenwich Mills	Greenwich Mills	December 20, 2006 (#06001151)	42 Ladd St. 41°40′01″N 71°26′52″W	Warwick	
40	Harris Mill	Harris Mill	July 27, 2007 (#07000761)	618 Main St. 41°43′29″N 71°32′11″W	Coventry	
41	Hopelands	Hopelands	August 18, 1983 (#83000173)	Wampanoag Rd. 41°39′27″N 71°25′02″W	Warwick	Now the campus of the Rocky Hill School.
42	Hopkins Hollow Village	Hopkins Hollow Village	January 27, 2010 (#09001290)	Hopkins Hollow Rd., Narrow Ln., and Perry Hill Rd. 41°40′59″N 71°45′06″W	Coventry and West Greenwich	
43	Indian Oaks	Indian Oaks	August 18, 1983 (#83000174)	836 Warwick Neck Ave. 41°40′55″N 71°22′35″W	Warwick	
44	Interlaken Mill Bridge	Interlaken Mill Bridge	December 22, 1978 (#78000064)	Spans the Pawtuxet River at Arkwright; 41°43′41″N 71°32′39″W	Coventry	
45	Kent County Courthouse	Kent County Courthouse	April 28, 1970 (#70000013)	127 Main St. 41°39′39″N 71°27′02″W	East Greenwich	Now East Greenwich Town Hall
46	Knight Estate	Knight Estate	February 23, 1984 (#84001864)	486 East Ave. 41°43′06″N 71°28′54″W	Warwick	
47	Lambert Farm Site, RI-269		November 3, 1983 (#83003798)	Address Restricted	Warwick	
48	Lippitt Mill	Lippitt Mill	January 11, 1974 (#74000053)	825 Main St. 41°43′12″N 71°31′38″W	West Warwick	
49	Massie Wireless Station	Massie Wireless Station	October 22, 2001 (#01001157)	1300 Frenchtown Rd. (New England Wireless and Steam Museum); 41°37′33″N 71°30′45″W	East Greenwich	
50	Meadows Archeological District		November 3, 1983 (#83003800)	Address Restricted	Warwick	
51	Moosup River Site (RI-1153)		December 10, 1987 (#87002083)	Address Restricted	Coventry	
52	Paine House	Paine House	May 1, 1974 (#74000039)	Station St. 41°41′29″N 71°33′54″W	Coventry	
53	Pawtuxet Valley Dyeing Company	Pawtuxet Valley Dyeing Company	November 16, 2005 (#05001296)	9 Howard Ave. 41°43′25″N 71°32′17″W	Coventry	
54	Pawtuxet Village Historic District	Pawtuxet Village Historic District	April 24, 1973 (#73000050)	Bounded roughly by Bayside, S. Atlantic, and Ocean Aves., Pawtuxet and Providence rivers, and Post Rd. 41°45′49″N 71°23′27″W	Warwick	
55	Pontiac Mills	Pontiac Mills	June 5, 1972 (#72000019)	Knight St. 41°43′35″N 71°28′13″W	Warwick	
56	Read School	Read School	March 20, 2002 (#02000231)	1670 Flat River Rd. 41°42′20″N 71°35′50″W	Coventry	
57	Rhode Island State Airport Terminal	Rhode Island State Airport Terminal	August 18, 1983 (#83000175)	572 Occupasstuxet Rd. 41°43′54″N 71°25′44″W	Warwick	
58	Christopher Rhodes House	Christopher Rhodes House	March 31, 1971 (#71000015)	25 Post Rd. 41°45′49″N 71°23′29″W	Warwick	
59	Rice City Historic District	Rice City Historic District	June 9, 1980 (#80000078)	West of Coventry Center at RI 14 and RI 117; 41°42′37″N 71°45′52″W	Coventry	
60	Royal Mill Complex	Royal Mill Complex	April 29, 2004 (#04000377)	125 Providence St. 41°42′49″N 71°31′00″W	West Warwick	
61	St. Mary's Church and Cemetery	St. Mary's Church and Cemetery	November 21, 1978 (#78000065)	Church St. 41°41′12″N 71°31′08″W	West Warwick	
62	South Main Street Historic District	South Main Street Historic District	July 10, 1987 (#87001064)	Cady, S. Main, and Wood Sts. 41°41′17″N 71°34′03″W	Coventry	
63	William B. Spencer House	William B. Spencer House	February 14, 2012 (#08000716)	11 Fairview Ave. 41°43′11″N 71°31′59″W	West Warwick	
64	Spencer–Shippee–Lillbridge House	Spencer–Shippee–Lillbridge House	April 20, 2011 (#11000207)	12 Middle Rd. 41°39′16″N 71°27′51″W	East Greenwich	
65	Tillinghast Mill Site	Tillinghast Mill Site	March 10, 1988 (#88000164)	Frenchtown Park; 41°37′41″N 71°30′23″W	East Greenwich	
66	Tillinghast Road Historic District	Tillinghast Road Historic District	March 9, 1988 (#88000167)	Tillinghast Rd. 41°37′03″N 71°30′39″W	East Greenwich	
67	Trafalgar Site, RI-639		November 3, 1983 (#83003801)	Address Restricted	Warwick	
68	Valley Queen Mill	Valley Queen Mill	January 19, 1984 (#84001880)	700 Providence St. 41°43′11″N 71°29′29″W	West Warwick	
69	Gen. James Mitchell Varnum House	Gen. James Mitchell Varnum House	August 12, 1971 (#71000016)	57 Peirce St. 41°39′49″N 71°27′06″W	East Greenwich	
70	Warwick Civic Center Historic District	Warwick Civic Center Historic District	June 27, 1980 (#80000079)	Post Rd. 41°41′57″N 71°27′31″W	Warwick	
71	Warwick Lighthouse	Warwick Lighthouse	March 30, 1988 (#88000268)	1350 Warwick Neck Ave. 41°40′01″N 71°22′43″W	Warwick	
72	Waterman Tavern	Waterman Tavern	July 24, 1974 (#74000040)	283 Maple Valley Rd. 41°43′10″N 71°39′37″W	Coventry	
73	John R. Waterman House	John R. Waterman House	August 18, 1983 (#83000176)	100 Old Homestead Rd. 41°43′16″N 71°23′43″W	Warwick	
74	William Waterman House	William Waterman House	November 14, 1980 (#80000080)	RI 102; 41°42′13″N 71°41′51″W	Coventry	
75	Clement Weaver-Daniel Howland House	Clement Weaver-Daniel Howland House	November 7, 1995 (#95001266)	125 Howland Rd. 41°39′32″N 71°28′40″W	East Greenwich	
76	West Greenwich Baptist Church and Cemetery	West Greenwich Baptist Church and Cemetery	November 28, 1978 (#78000066)	Plain Meeting House and Liberty Hill Rds. 41°38′16″N 71°45′10″W	West Greenwich Center	
77	West Winds	West Winds	May 20, 1993 (#93000425)	300 Wakefield St. 41°43′30″N 71°30′52″W	West Warwick	
78	Col. Micah Whitmarsh House	Col. Micah Whitmarsh House	February 18, 1971 (#71000017)	294 Main St. 41°39′34″N 71°27′01″W	East Greenwich	
79	Oliver A. Wickes House	Oliver A. Wickes House	August 18, 1983 (#83000177)	794 Major Potter Rd. 41°40′25″N 71°28′30″W	Warwick	
80	Wilson-Winslow House	Wilson-Winslow House	November 4, 1993 (#93001182)	2414 Harkney Hill Rd. 41°41′09″N 71°40′45″W	Coventry	
81	Windmill Cottage	Windmill Cottage	May 22, 1973 (#73000051)	144 Division St. 41°39′49″N 71°27′23″W	East Greenwich	

== Former listings ==
	Name on the Register	Image	Date listed	Date removed	Location	City or town	Description
1	Hopkins Mill		January 11, 1974 (#74002295)	October 18, 1978	RI 3	West Greenwich	Demolished in 1978 for the Big River Reservoir project.
2	Phenix Baptist Church		June 30, 1976 (#76002272)	August 8, 1978	10 Fairview Ave.	West Warwick	Demolished in May, 1978.

== See also ==
- List of National Historic Landmarks in Rhode Island
- National Register of Historic Places listings in Rhode Island
