= William B. Spencer House =

Historic house in Rhode Island, United States

- U.S. National Register of Historic Places
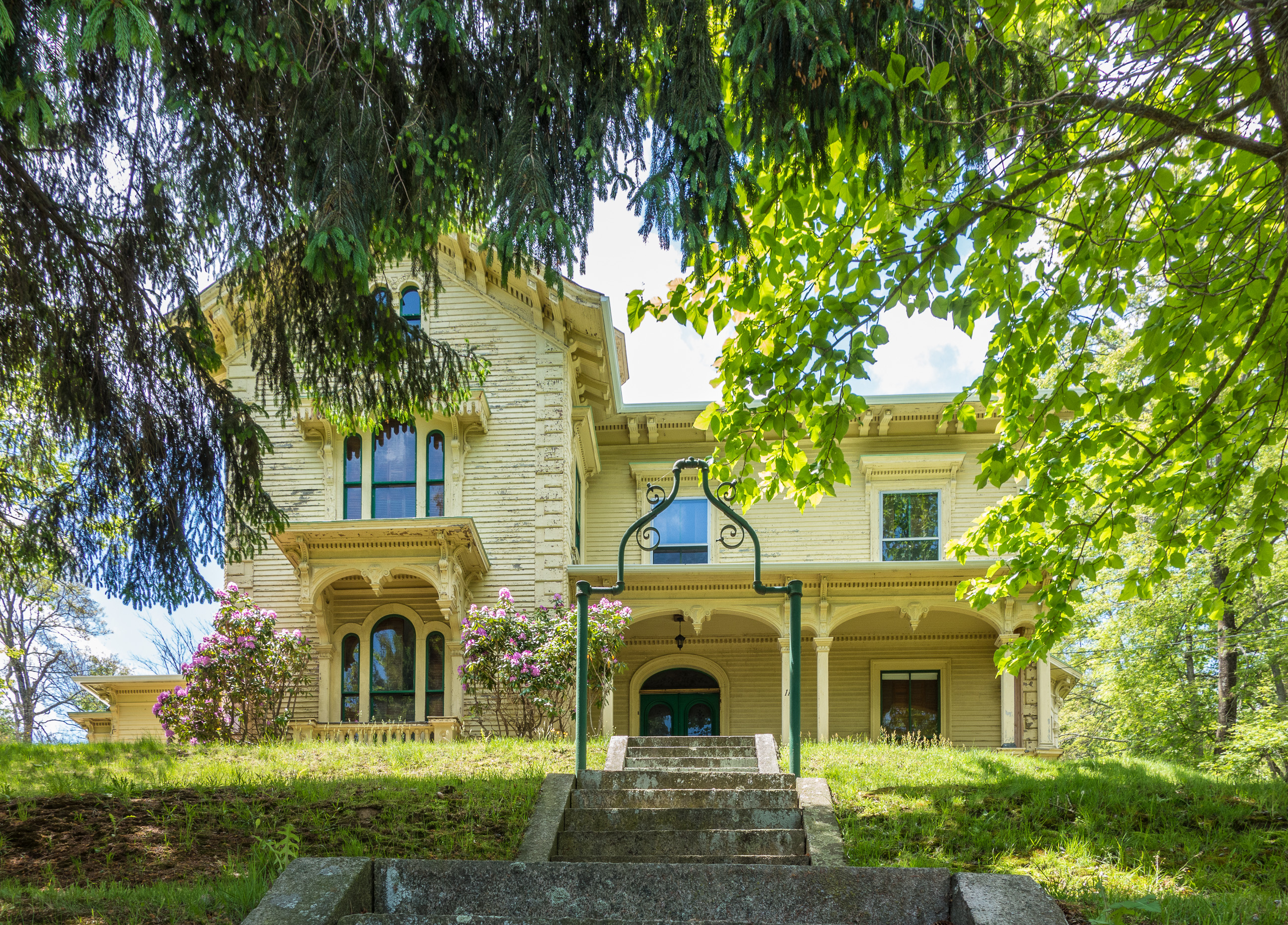
- William B. Spencer House in 2014

- Location within Rhode Island Location within the United States
- Location: 11 Fairview Avenue, West Warwick, Rhode Island
- Coordinates: 41°43′11″N 71°31′59″W
- Built: 1870
- Architectural style: Italianate
- NRHP reference No.: 08000716
- Added to NRHP: February 14, 2012

The William B. Spencer House is a historic house at 11 Fairview Avenue in the Phenix village of West Warwick, Rhode Island. The 2 1/2-story wood-frame house was built in 1869–70, and is an elaborate and well-preserved instance of Late Victorian Italianate style. The house has an L shape, with forward projecting gable section on the left, in front of a rectangular main block. A single-story porch with slender columns and decorative woodwork valances extends across the front to the right of the projecting section. The windows on the projecting section are three-part rounded windows, each with distinctive and elaborate hoods. The building corners are quoined, and the roofline features dentil moulding and paired brackets. A series of smaller ells project to the right of the main block, and there is a small single-story addition to the rear. The main block is topped by an octagonal cupola with round-arch windows. The building's owner, William B. Spencer, was a local entrepreneur who made his fortune by dealing in the waste materials generated by the local cotton mills.

The house was listed on the National Register of Historic Places in 2012.

== See also ==
- National Register of Historic Places listings in Kent County, Rhode Island
