= Peter Greene House =

Historic house in Rhode Island, United States

- U.S. National Register of Historic Places
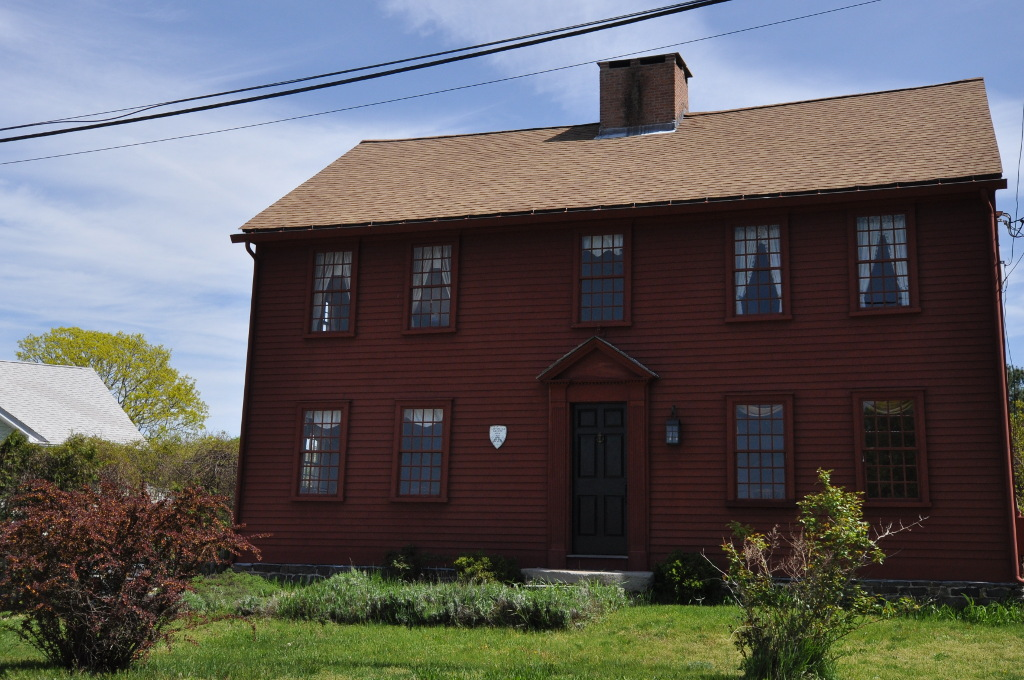

- Location within Rhode Island Location within the United States
- Location: 1124 W. Shore Rd., Warwick, Rhode Island
- Coordinates: 41°42′55″N 71°22′34″W
- Built: 1751
- Architectural style: Colonial
- MPS: Warwick MRA
- NRHP reference No.: 83000170
- Added to NRHP: August 18, 1983

The Peter Greene House is a historic house in Warwick, Rhode Island, USA. The 2 1/2-story wood-frame house was built around 1751, probably by the sons of a militia captain named Peter Greene, and is a rare surviving 18th-century house in Warwick. It has a five-bay facade with a plain door surround, a central chimney, and a rear ell.

The house was listed on the National Register of Historic Places in 1983.

== See also ==
- National Register of Historic Places listings in Kent County, Rhode Island
