= National Register of Historic Places listings in Rhode Island =

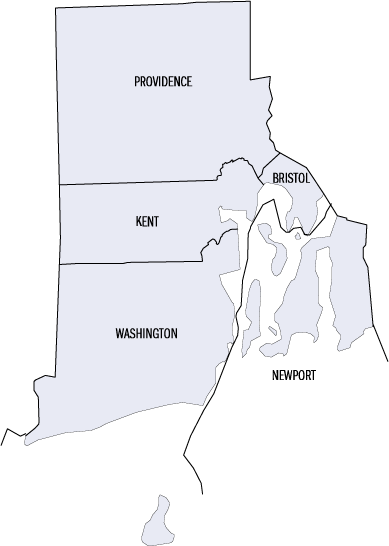
Rhode Island counties (clickable map)

This is a list of properties and districts listed on the National Register of Historic Places in Rhode Island. As of May 29, 2015, there are more than 750 listed sites in Rhode Island. All 5 of the counties in Rhode Island have listings on the National Register.

Contents: Counties in Rhode Island

Bristol | Kent | Newport | Providence (Pawtucket | Providence (city) | Woonsocket) | Washington

This National Park Service list is complete through NPS recent listings posted June 26, 2026.

== Current listings by county ==
The following are approximate tallies of current listings by county. These counts are based on entries in the National Register Information Database as of April 24, 2008 and new weekly listings posted since then on the National Register of Historic Places web site. There are frequent additions to the listings and occasional delistings and the counts here are approximate and not official. New entries are added to the official Register on a weekly basis. Also, the counts in this table exclude boundary increase and decrease listings which modify the area covered by an existing property or district and which carry a separate National Register reference number. The numbers of NRHP listings in each county are documented by tables in each of the individual county list-articles.

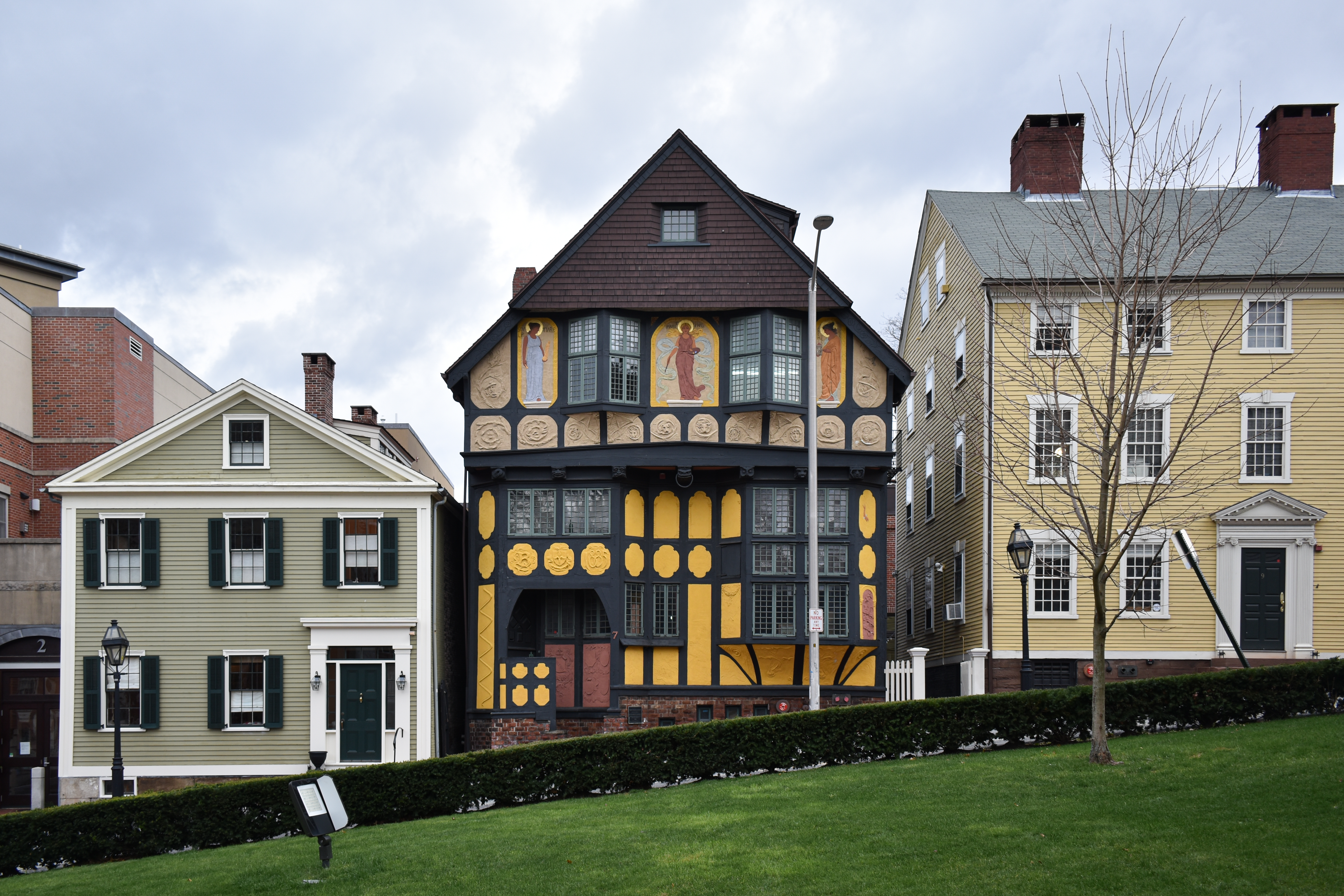
College Hill Historic District, Providence

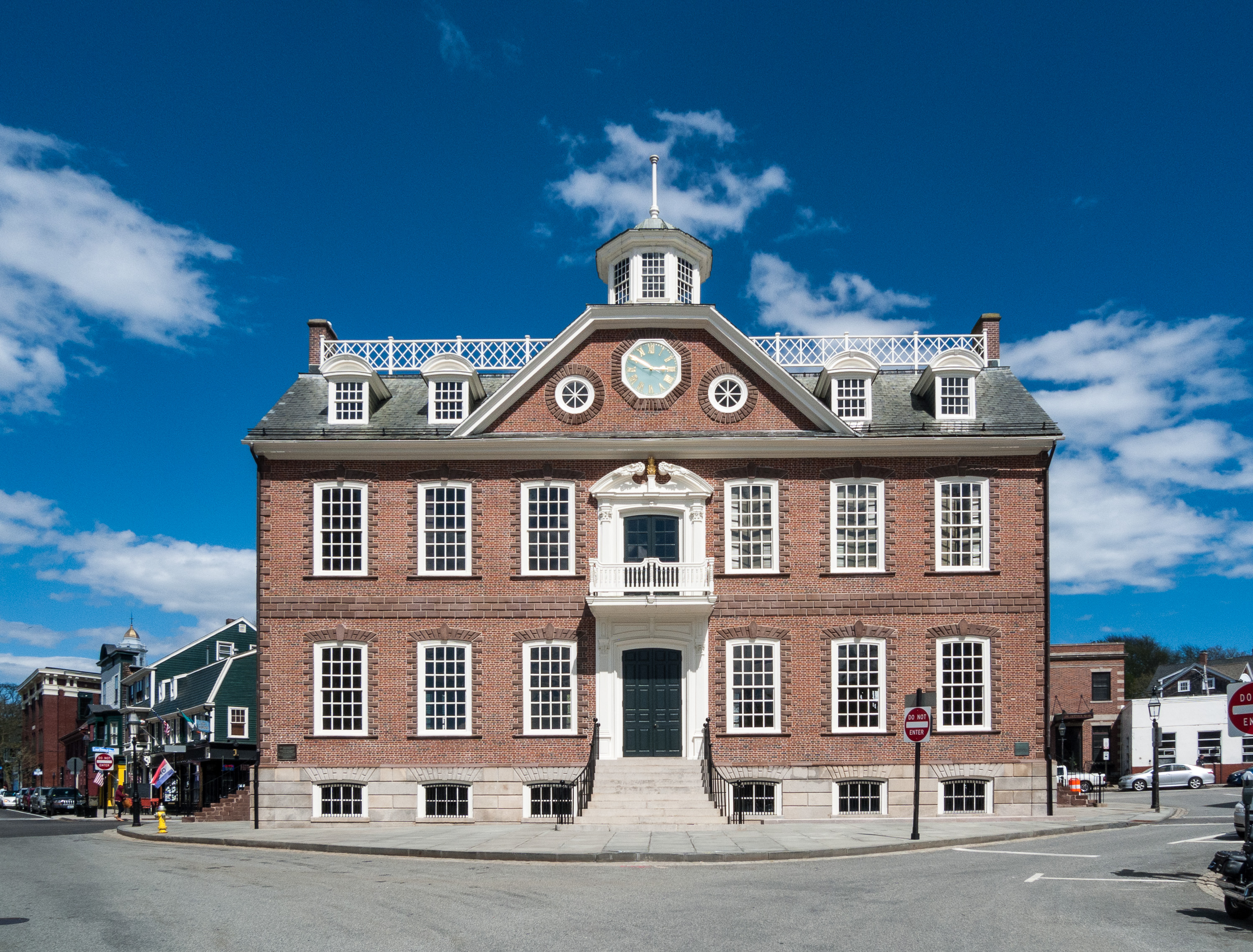
Old Colony House, Newport

	County	# of Sites
1	Bristol	25
2	Kent	81
3	Newport	126
4.1	Providence: Pawtucket	58
4.2	Providence: Providence (city)	171
4.3	Providence: Woonsocket	44
4.4	Providence: Other	171
4.5	Providence: Duplicates	(4) (Note: A portion of the Blackstone Canal (refnum #71000030) is listed in Providence, Pawtucket, and other parts of Providence County, while the balance (refnum #91001536) extends through Woonsocket and other parts of the county; Conant Thread-Coats & Clark Mill Complex District is listed in both Pawtucket and Central Falls; Norwood Avenue Historic District is listed in Providence and Cranston.)
4.5	Providence: Total	440
5	Washington	134
(duplicates)		(3) (Note: The following sites are listed in multiple counties: Arkwright Bridge (Kent and Providence, Mount Hope Bridge (Bristol and Newport), Pawtuxet Village Historic District (Kent and Providence))
Total:		803

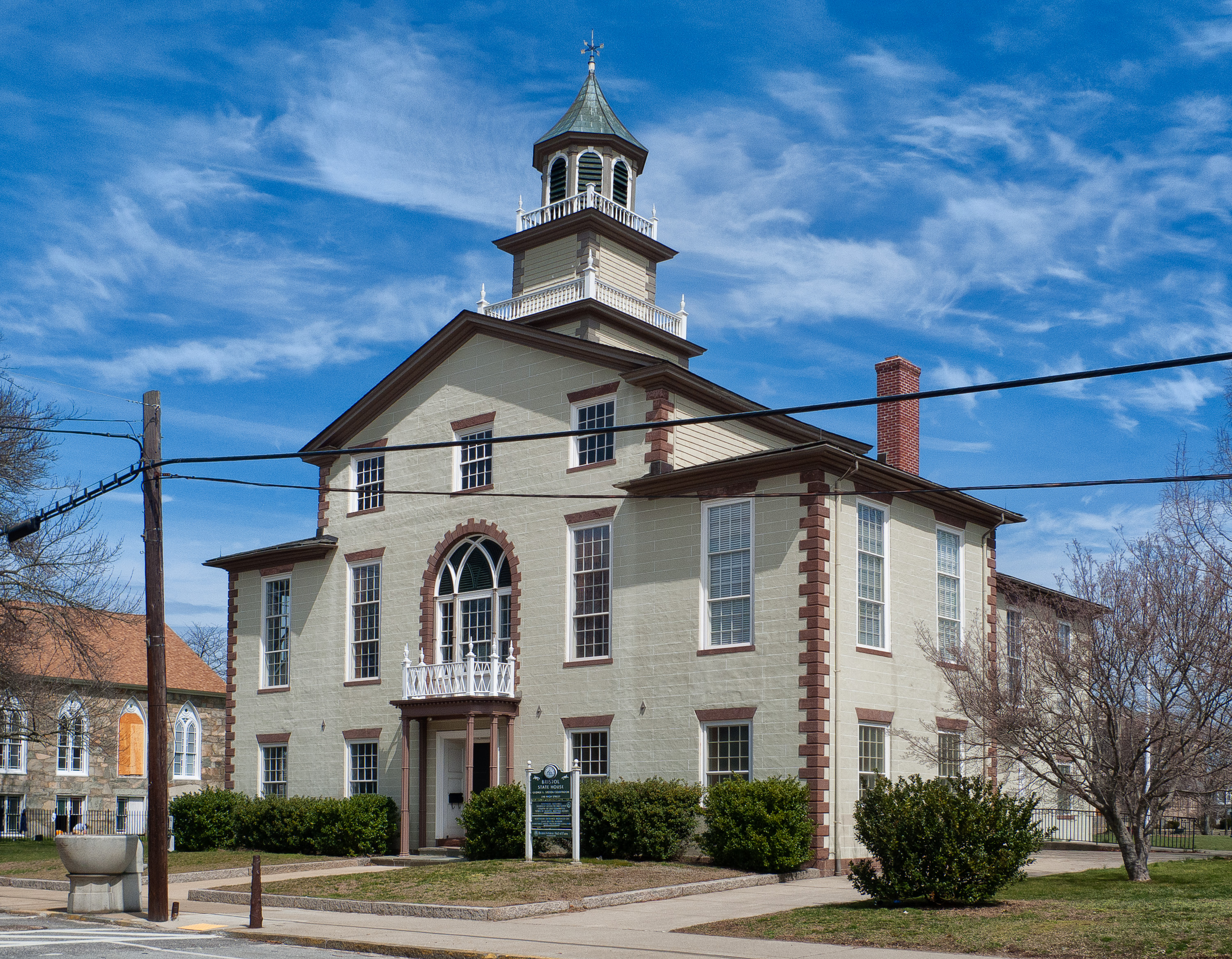
Bristol County Courthouse, Bristol

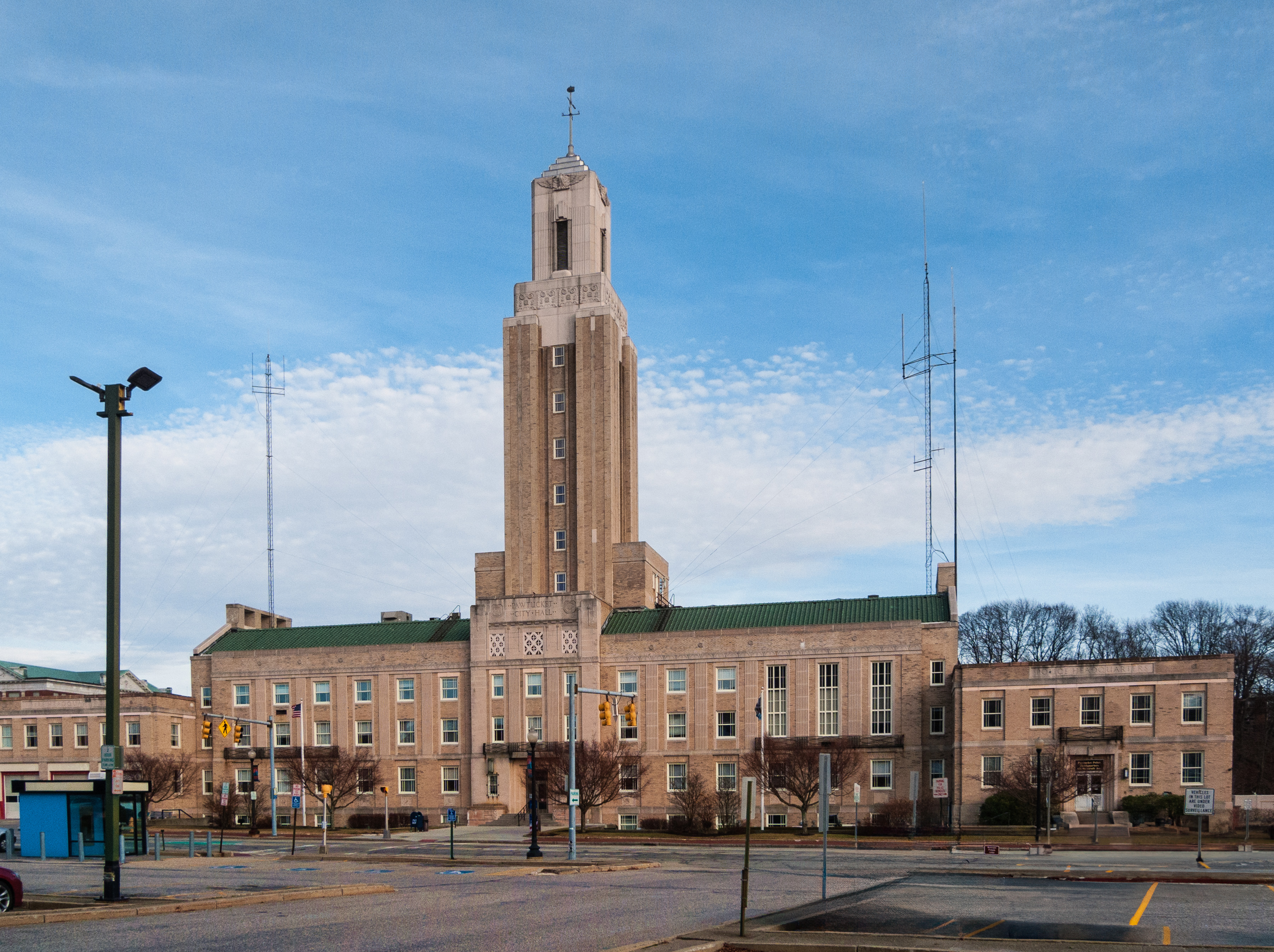
Pawtucket City Hall, Pawtucket

== See also ==
- List of National Historic Landmarks in Rhode Island
- List of bridges on the National Register of Historic Places in Rhode Island
- List of historical societies in Rhode Island
