= 1846 Rhode Island gubernatorial election =

- April 1, 1846
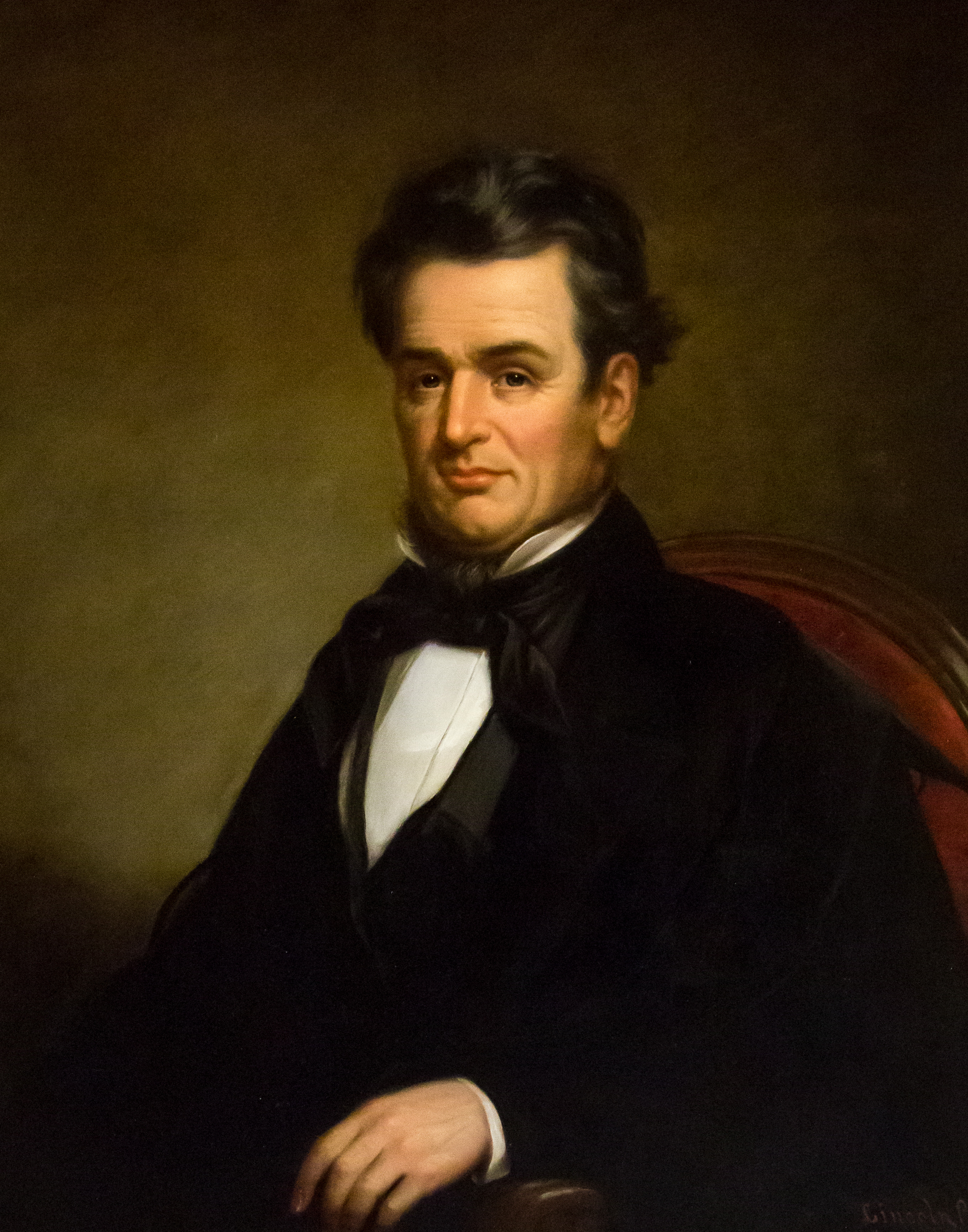

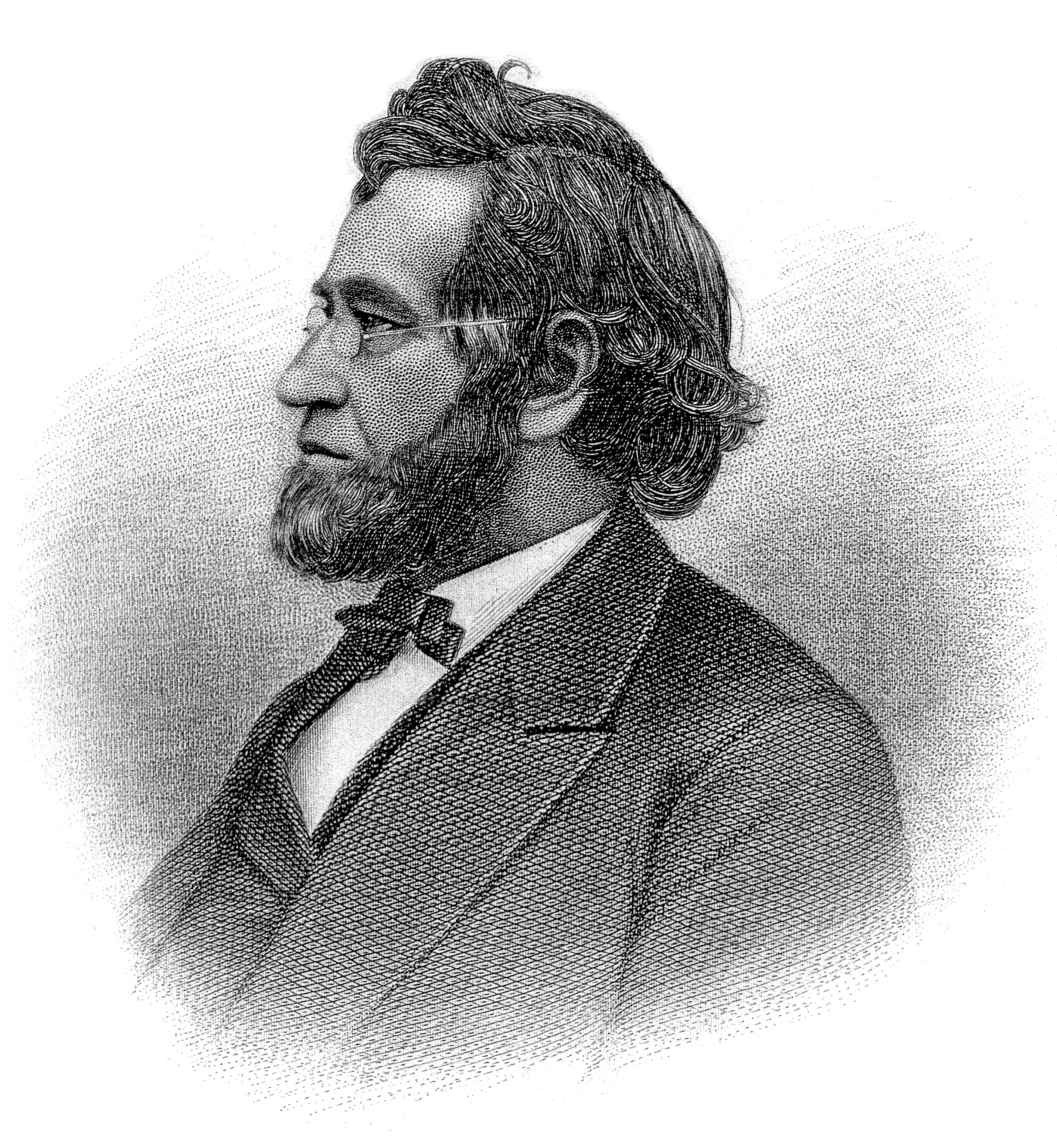
Nominee	Byron Diman	Charles Jackson
Party	Law and Order	Liberation
Alliance		Democratic
Popular vote	7,477	7,391
Percentage	49.77%	49.20%
- County results Diman: 50–60% 60–70% 70–80% Jackson: 50–60%
Governor before election
Charles Jackson
Liberation
Elected Governor
Byron Diman
Law and Order

The 1846 Rhode Island gubernatorial election was held on April 1, 1846, in order to elect the governor of Rhode Island. Law and Order nominee and incumbent lieutenant governor Byron Diman defeated incumbent Liberation governor Charles Jackson, who was jointly nominated by the Democratic Party. However, as no candidate received a majority of the total votes cast as was required by Rhode Island law, the election was forwarded to the Rhode Island legislature, who chose Diman as governor.

== General election ==
On election day, April 1, 1846, Law and Order nominee Byron Diman won the election by a margin of 86 votes against his opponent incumbent Liberation governor Charles Jackson, thereby gaining Law and Order control over the office of governor. Diman was sworn in as the 19th governor of Rhode Island on May 6, 1846.

=== Results ===
Rhode Island gubernatorial election, 1846
Party	Candidate	Votes	%
Law and Order	Byron Diman	7,477	49.77
Democratic	Charles Jackson (incumbent)	7,391	49.20
	Scattering	155	1.03
Total votes		15,023	100.00
Law and Order gain from Liberation			
