= 1842 Rhode Island gubernatorial election =

- April 6, 1842
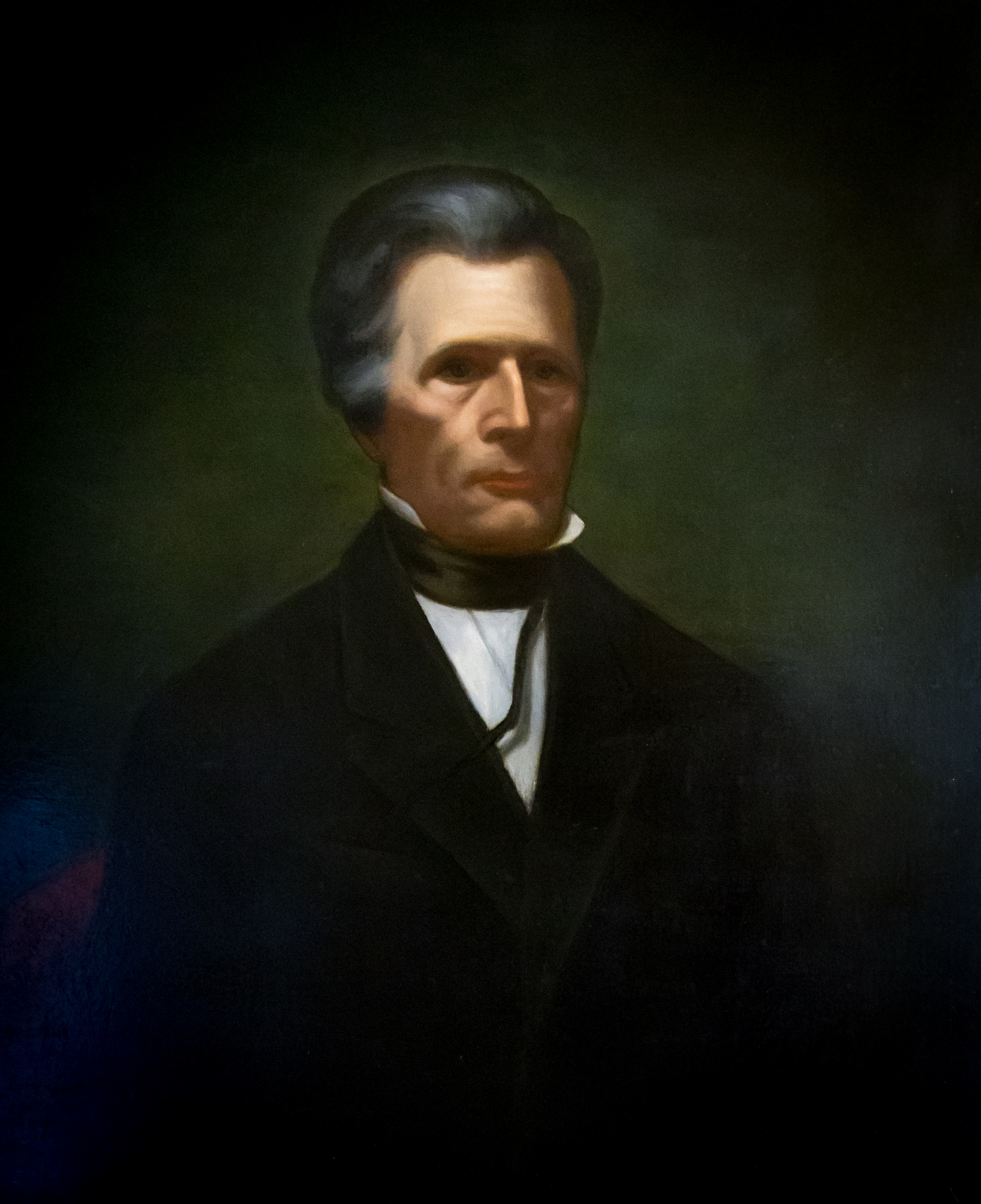

| Nominee | Samuel Ward King | Thomas F. Carpenter |
| Party | Whig | Democratic |
| Popular vote | 4,864 | 2,281 |
| Percentage | 68.08% | 31.92% |
- County results King: 50–60% 60–70% 70–80% 80–90%
Governor before election
Samuel Ward King
Whig
Elected Governor
Samuel Ward King
Whig

The 1842 Rhode Island gubernatorial election was held on April 6, 1842, in order to elect the governor of Rhode Island. Incumbent Whig governor Samuel Ward King won re-election against Democratic nominee Thomas F. Carpenter in a rematch of the 1840 election.

== General election ==
On election day, April 6, 1842, incumbent Whig governor Samuel Ward King won re-election by a margin of 2,583 votes against his opponent Democratic nominee Thomas F. Carpenter, thereby retaining Whig control over the office of governor. King was sworn in for his fourth term on May 2, 1842.

=== Results ===
Rhode Island gubernatorial election, 1842
| Party | Candidate | Votes | % |
|---|---|---|---|
| Whig | Samuel Ward King (incumbent) | 4,864 | 68.08 |
| Democratic | Thomas F. Carpenter | 2,281 | 31.92 |
| | Scattering | 4 | 0.05 |
| Total votes | | 7,321 | 100.00 |
| Whig hold | | | |
