= 1847 Rhode Island gubernatorial election =

- April 7, 1847
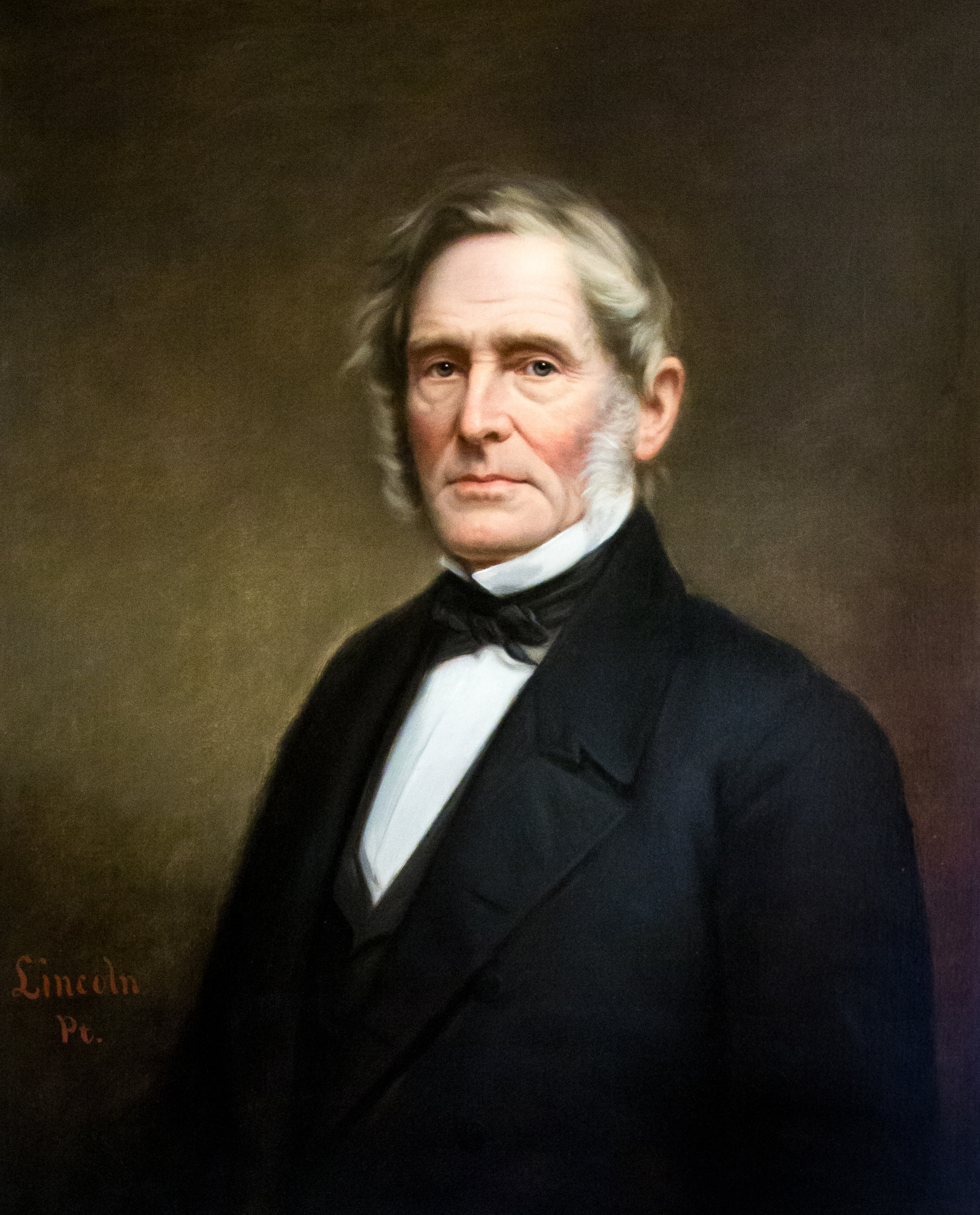

Nominee	Elisha Harris	Olney Ballou
Party	Whig	Democratic
Popular vote	6,300	4,350
Percentage	55.30%	38.18%
- County results Harris: 40–50% 50–60% 60–70% 70–80%
Governor before election
Byron Diman
Law and Order
Elected Governor
Elisha Harris
Whig

The 1847 Rhode Island gubernatorial election was held on April 7, 1847.

Incumbent Law and Order Governor Byron Diman did not run for re-election. Whig nominee Elisha Harris defeated Democratic nominee Olney Ballou.

== General election ==
=== Candidates ===
- Olney Ballou, Democratic, incumbent State Senator
- Elisha Harris, Whig, incumbent lieutenant governor of Rhode Island

=== Results ===
1847 Rhode Island gubernatorial election
Party	Candidate	Votes	%	±%
Whig	Elisha Harris	6,300	55.30%	
Democratic	Olney Ballou	4,350	38.18%	
Scattering		743	6.52%	
Majority		1,950	17.12%	
Turnout		11,393		
Whig gain from Law and Order		Swing		
