= 1845 Rhode Island gubernatorial election =

- April 2, 1845
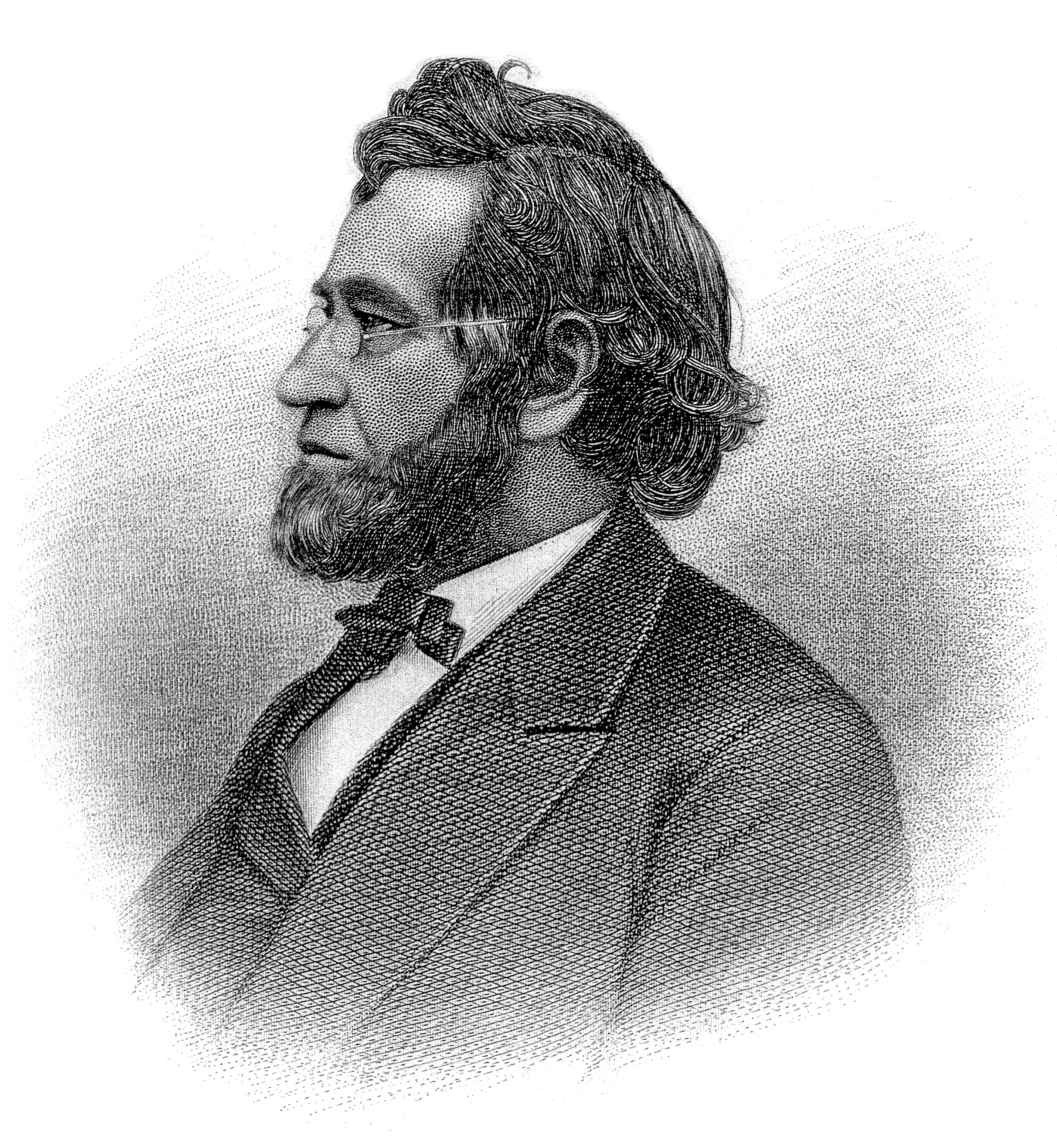

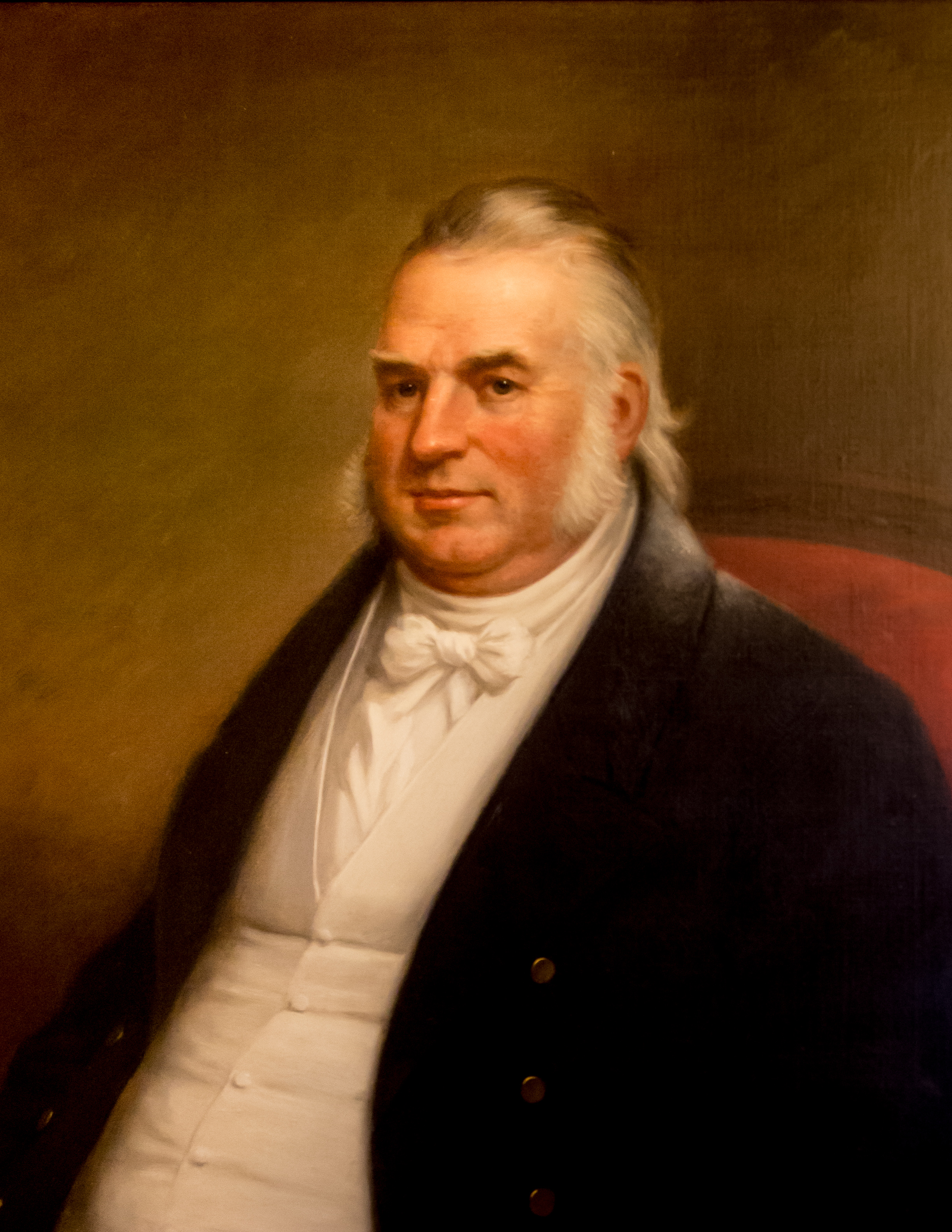
Nominee	Charles Jackson	James Fenner
Party	Liberation	Law and Order
Popular vote	8,007	7,795
Percentage	50.48%	49.14%
- County results Jackson: 50–60% Fenner: 50–60% 60–70% 70–80%
Governor before election
James Fenner
Law and Order
Elected Governor
Charles Jackson
Liberation

The 1845 Rhode Island gubernatorial election was held on April 2, 1845, in order to elect the governor of Rhode Island. The Liberation nominee and former speaker of the Rhode Island House of Representatives Charles Jackson defeated the Law and Order incumbent governor James Fenner.

== General election ==
On election day, April 2, 1845, Liberation nominee Charles Jackson won the election by a margin of 212 votes against his opponent incumbent Law and Order Governor James Fenner, thereby gaining Liberation control over the office of governor. Jackson was sworn in as the 18th governor of Rhode Island on May 6, 1845.

=== Results ===
Rhode Island gubernatorial election, 1845
Party	Candidate	Votes	%
Liberation	Charles Jackson	8,007	50.48
Law and Order	James Fenner (incumbent)	7,795	49.14
	Scattering	61	0.38
Total votes		15,863	100.00
Liberation gain from Law and Order			
