= Thomas Wilson Dorr =

American politician (1805–1854)

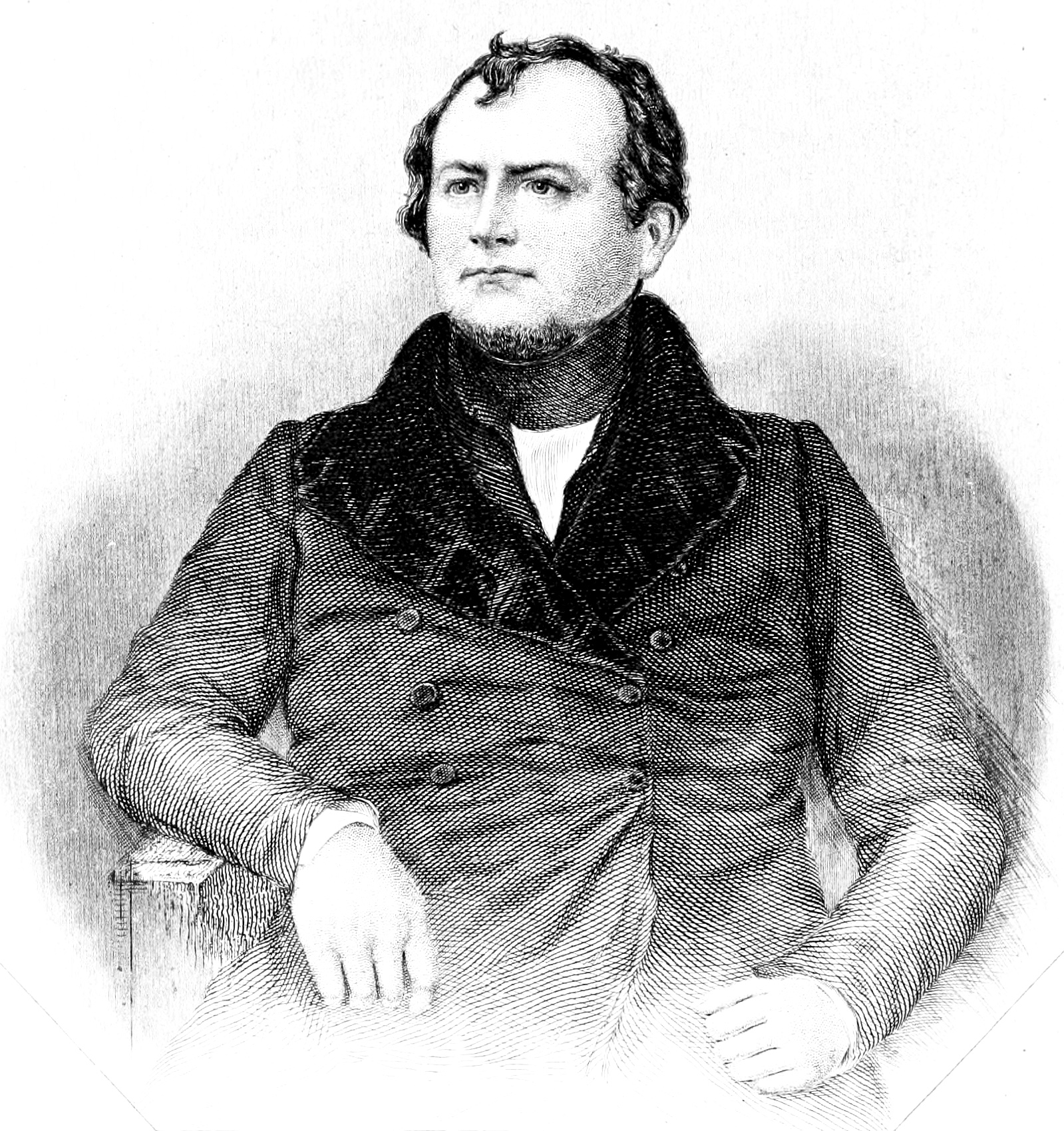

16th Governor of Rhode Island (extralegal)
- In office May 1, 1842 – January 23, 1843; Along with Samuel Ward King
- Lieutenant: Byron Diman
- Preceded by: Samuel Ward King
- Succeeded by: Samuel Ward King

Personal details
- Born: November 5, 1805 Providence, Rhode Island
- Died: December 27, 1854 (aged 49) Providence, Rhode Island
- Resting place: Swan Point Cemetery, Providence, Rhode Island
- Party: Rhode Island Suffrage Party
- Other political affiliations: People's Party
- Education: Harvard College (AB)
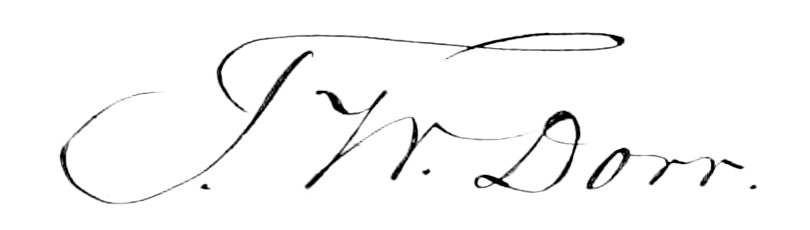
- Signature

Thomas Wilson Dorr (November 5, 1805 – December 27, 1854), was an American politician and reformer in Rhode Island, best known for leading the Dorr Rebellion.

== Early life, family, and education ==
Thomas Wilson Dorr was born in Providence, Rhode Island, the son of Sullivan and Lydia (Allen) Dorr. His father was a prosperous manufacturer and co-owner of Bernon Mill Village. Dorr's family occupied a good social position. He had sisters and other siblings.

As a boy, he attended Phillips Exeter Academy. After graduating from Harvard College in 1823, he went to New York City, where he studied law under Chancellor James Kent and Vice-Chancellor William McCoun. He was admitted to the bar in 1827 and returned to Providence to practice.

Thomas Dorr never married, but two of his sisters wed prominent men. One of his nephews married a daughter of John Lothrop Motley.

== Background ==
Dorr began his political career when elected as a representative in the Rhode Island General Assembly in 1834. He became concerned about issues of the franchise: white men who were not allowed to vote because they did not own a certain value of real estate, and the dominance of rural interests in the state legislature, where seats were apportioned by geographic jurisdictions, with all towns being treated as equal.

In the half-century following the American Revolution, some activists worked to expand the franchise, often by reducing property or similar requirements. In Rhode Island, such attempts were made at intervals from 1797 to 1834 but had invariably been obstructed by the state government. In 1834 a convention met at the capital of Providence to consider the matter again. Dorr was a member of the committee which drew up an address to the people. All efforts at reform, however, were blocked again by the legislature, dominated by rural interests. Its apportionment resulted in an under-representation of the growing urban populations in the industrializing cities.

By 1841, Rhode Island was one of a few states that had not adopted universal suffrage for white males. It was the only remaining state that had not yet adopted a new state constitution following the Revolution, instead relying on its original 17th-century colonial charter. Under that document, the original grantees had had the sole right to decide who should have a voice in the management of public affairs. As was customary at the time, they had decreed that land ownership, specifically of "a moderate landed estate", was required to vote.

By 1840, this requirement resulted in more than half the adult white male population being excluded from voting. Apportionment by geographic towns resulted in 19 seats, more than half of the legislature, being held by towns that had a total population of only 3,500 voters, when the state had a total of 108,000 residents, with many of them living in the larger cities.

Moreover, no person who did not own real estate could bring suit for recovery of debt or obtain redress for personal injury unless a freeholder endorsed his writ. Many residents had become landless with the onset of the Industrial Revolution, and the number of residents who did not own real estate was increasing with a wave of immigration from Ireland.

== Suffrage referendum ==
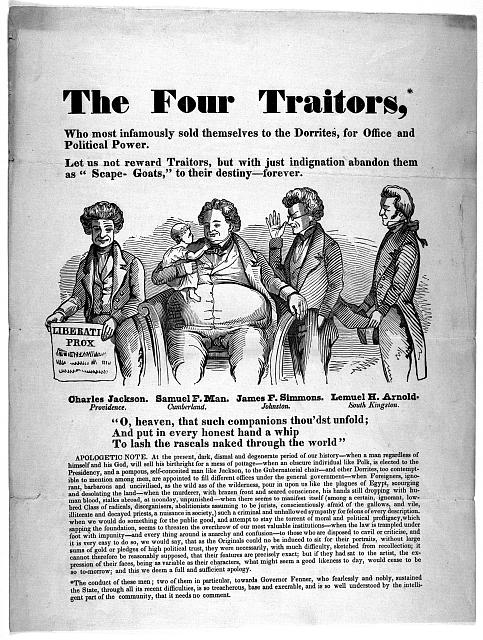
Illustrated broadside from the Library of Congress, entitled "The four traitors, who most infamously sold themselves to the Dorrites for office and political power".

In 1840 the Rhode Island Suffrage Association was formed to address this increasingly unsatisfactory situation, and processions and popular meetings were held. State legislator Thomas Wilson Dorr took a leading part in the agitation.

The legislature refused to remedy the grievances, and the old charter did not provide any means for citizens to convene a constitutional convention. A "People's Party", therefore, was formed, which held a convention, adopted a constitution, and submitted it to a vote of the people. Approximately 14,000 ballots were cast in favor of it, and less than 100 cast against it. Of those in favor, more than 4,900 were qualified voters. The proposed state constitution was formally approved not only by the majority of the males over twenty-one but apparently by a majority of the voters considered legal under the charter.

The existing state government refused to consider any of these acts as legal.

=== Constitutional Convention called ===
The legislature called a constitutional convention itself and submitted a new constitution to the people. The government's constitution was defeated by the narrow margin of 676 votes out of 16,702. This new constitution provided for most of what Dorr and his followers had been seeking, and historians believe their rejection of it was a tactical error. Feelings had become very bitter, and the Dorrites had already put their constitution into effect by electing an entire state ticket, with Dorr as governor.

== Governor Thomas Wilson Dorr ==
In May 1842 two governments in Rhode Island had held elections and were claiming the allegiance of the people. The People's Party did not attempt to seize the state house or machinery of government. Both governors issued proclamations, and Governor Samuel Ward King of the "Law and Order" party appealed to Washington, DC for Federal aid. Dorr went to Washington to plead his own cause before President John Tyler. There he received no encouragement, and he returned to Rhode Island.

=== Governor in exile ===
Meanwhile, King had proclaimed martial law, offered a US$5,000 reward for the capture of Dorr, and made wholesale imprisonments of the latter's followers under the "Algerine Law". Many of Dorr's followers deserted him and he fled the state on May 18, 1842. A bungled attack on the Providence arsenal (which his father and younger brother, partisans of the "Law and Order" faction, were helping defend) led to the rebellion's disintegration.

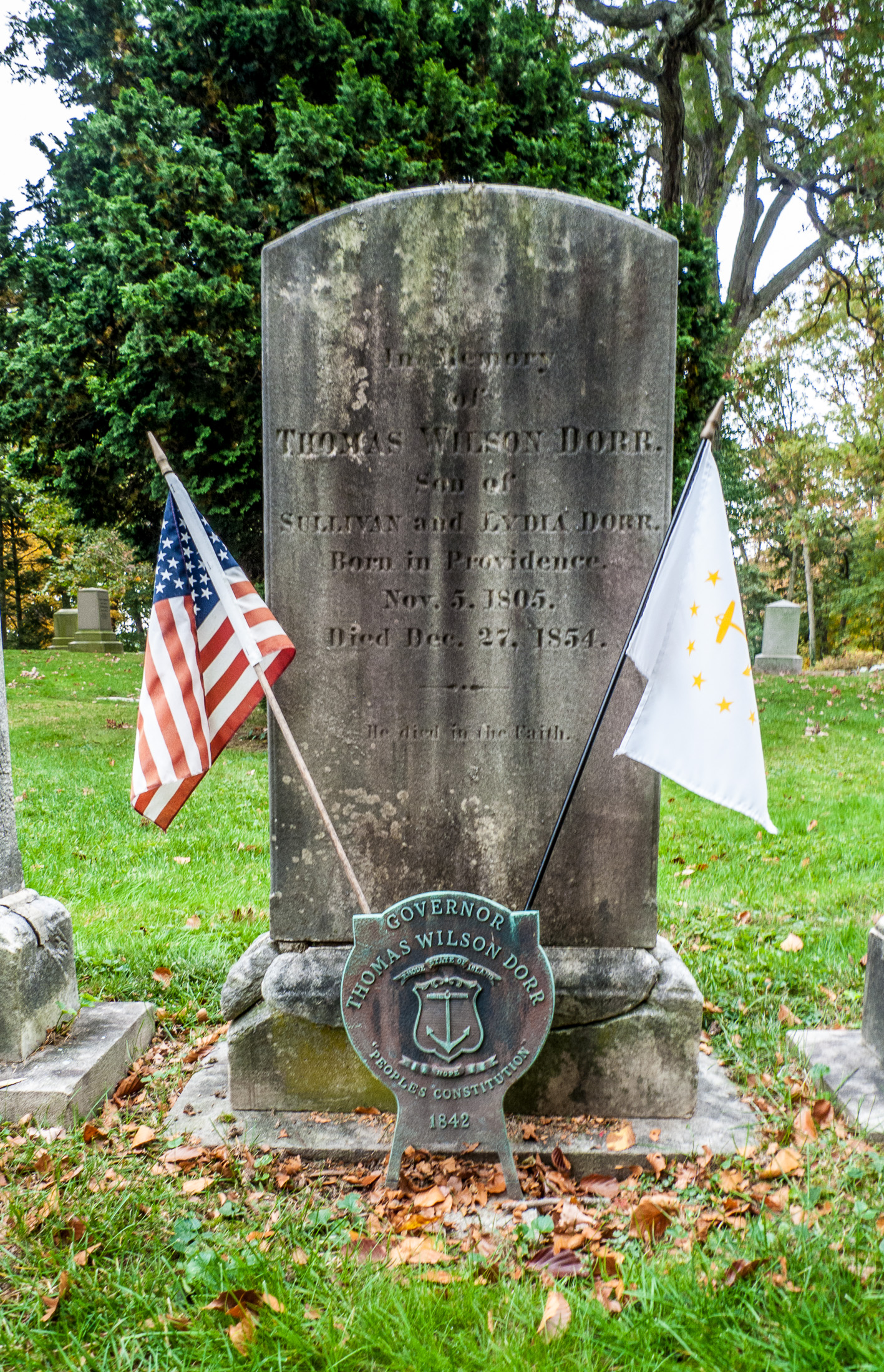
Grave of Governor Thomas Wilson Dorr in Swan Point Cemetery, Providence

Dorr returned briefly in June with a small band of New York volunteers and assembled an armed force of his followers on Acote's Hill in Chepachet. The governor ordered the state militia out, which marched on Chepachet. Realizing that they would be defeated if they engaged the militia, Dorr's followers dispersed. Dorr sought refuge in New Hampshire and Massachusetts.

== Aftermath ==
Dorr returned to Providence in October 1843, hoping that the more liberal constitution adopted the previous year would protect him, but he was arrested. He was tried for treason against Rhode Island at Newport before the Rhode Island Supreme Court, convicted, and on June 25, 1844, sentenced to imprisonment for life at hard labor in separate confinement. He entered the state prison at Providence on June 27.

Dorr's sentence drew substantial public and political criticism, and in 1845 the General Assembly passed an amnesty act under which he was released on June 27, 1845. His civil and political rights were restored in 1851. In January 1854, the General Assembly passed an act reversing and annulling his treason conviction. The justices of the Rhode Island Supreme Court subsequently issued a nonbinding advisory opinion stating that the legislature lacked constitutional authority to reverse a judicial judgment. However, the opinion did not itself invalidate the legislative annulment or reinstate Dorr's conviction. Although his health had deteriorated following his imprisonment, Dorr remained politically involved, participating in the Equal Rights resurgence of the early 1850s as a political strategist and adviser to his uncle, Governor Philip Allen. He died in Providence on December 27, 1854, aged 49.

The constitutional reform movement also produced lasting changes. A new state constitution was adopted by convention on November 5, 1842, ratified by voters later that month, and took effect on May 2, 1843, replacing the Royal Charter of 1663. It substantially expanded male suffrage, including extending voting rights to native-born Black men, although it retained restrictions including a property qualification for naturalized citizens. Today, Rhode Island's state government recognizes Dorr among the state's governors. A statue of Dorr at the Rhode Island State House was unveiled in 2014.
