= Dorr Rebellion =

Attempt to force broader democracy in the state of Rhode Island

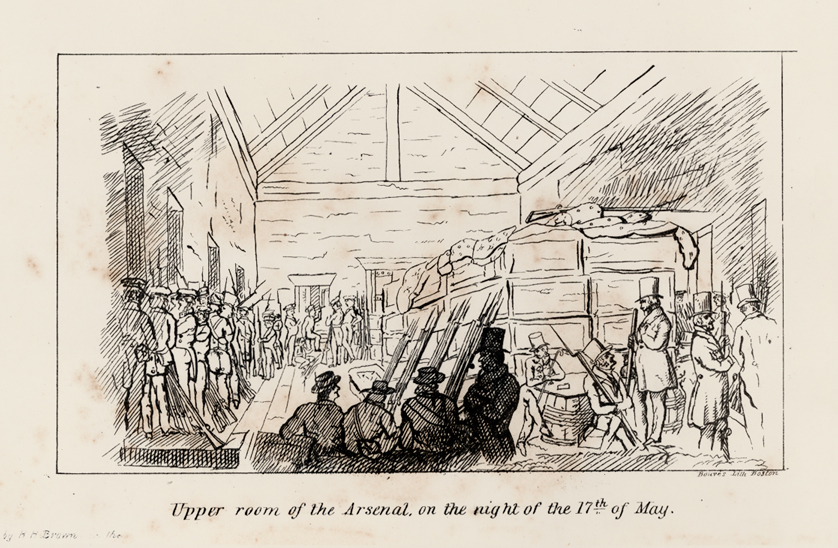
- "Upper room of the Arsenal, on the night of the 17th of May," 1842
Date	1841–1842
Location	Rhode Island
Result	Charterite victory

Belligerents
Charter government; Law and Order Party; Massachusetts; New York; Supported by: United States	Dorrites; Suffrage Party; Suffrage Association; Spartan Association

Commanders and leaders
Samuel Ward King; William Gibbs McNeil	Thomas Wilson Dorr; Colonel Wheeler; Colonel Dispeau (AWOL); Jedediah Sprague (POW); Michael Walsh (Spartans)

Strength
~3,500 (peak); 200 black militiamen	~300 (peak); 12 Spartans

Casualties and losses
1 killed 2 spies captured	0 killed Many arrested
- 1 civilian killed 1 civilian shot 100–200 civilians captured as Dorrites; 2 civilians captured as Algerine spies

The Dorr Rebellion (1841–1842) (also referred to as Dorr's Rebellion, Dorr's War or Dorr War) was an attempt by residents to force broader democracy in the state of Rhode Island. Led by Thomas Wilson Dorr, the movement mobilized his followers to demand changes to the state's electoral rules. Rhode Island was still using its 1663 colonial charter as a constitution, which required land ownership as a qualification to vote. The rebellion established a parallel government alongside the existing chartered government and wrote a new constitution for Rhode Island. Although the rebellion failed, it forced the rewriting of the state constitution to expand voter eligibility.

== Background ==
=== Charter ===
Unlike most states, which had created a new constitution during the American Revolution and revised them further by the 1840s in response to evolving political conditions, Rhode Island continued to operate under its original 1663 royal charter. While revolutionary for its time, the charter had grown obsolete, making it one of the minority of states that still had land requirements to vote. In 1664, the Rhode Island General Assembly enacted legislation restricting suffrage to "freemen", a class defined as white men over 21 (adults) who owned at least £100 (equivalent to US$24,000 in 2025) worth of real estate, and their eldest sons. Prospective freemen were also required to formally apply for membership in the corporation, though such applications were rarely denied. The requirement was later raised to £200, and then some years later to £400, before dropping to £40 (equivalent to US$9,000 in 2025) in 1762.

Freemen also reserved the right to serve on juries and bring lawsuits to court. A non-freeman could not initiate legal action unless sponsored by a freeman, a suit that would be heard in a jury of only freemen. The freeman system corresponded to a largely agrarian society, where land ownership was common, but became increasingly exclusionary as available land diminished and the Industrial Revolution, along with turning Rhode Island into an urban state, drew a growing, largely landless immigrant population, particularly Irish laborers. By the 1840s, an estimated 60% of the adult white male population in the state did not have the status of freemen. Some sources suggest the figure may have been even higher. Non-freemen were essentially second-class citizens.

The charter had also essentially created rotten boroughs. When the charter was written, Newport, then the colony's most populous city, was allocated six representatives in the General Assembly while Providence received only four. By the 1840s, Newport, never fully recovering from the British occupation during the Revolutionary War, had a population of approximately 8,000, yet retained its six representatives. Meanwhile, Providence had grown to over 23,000 residents but still had only four seats in the General Assembly.

Lastly, the charter lacked institutional checks and balances like those found in the federal constitution. The governor was merely a figurehead; he had no veto over the General Assembly and could only enforce their laws. Judicial appointments were controlled by the General Assembly and were often awarded on the basis of personal connections.

=== Reform attempts ===
As a royal grant rather than a constitution, the charter had no mechanism for amendment. (Note: Any amendment would have to have been done by the King as the sovereign of the colony. As sovereignty shifted to the state itself after the Revolutionary War, any method to amend the charter became unclear.) Open criticism of the charter began after 1800. At an 1824 constitutional convention, freemen rejected a new draft constitution two to one. Another convention in 1834 resulted in no change.

Many freemen resisted change and argued that expanding suffrage would invite voter fraud. State representative Benjamin Hazard, in Hazard's Report to the legislature (1829), found "nothing... either in facts or of reasoning, which requires the attention of the house.” Hazard expressed particular hostility toward Irish immigrants, declaring that they were "not among ours". He concluded:

We ought to recollect that all the evils which may result from an extension of suffrage will be evils beyond our reach. We shall entail them upon our latest posterity without remedy. Open this door, and the whole frame and character of our institutions are changed forever.

Fraud was prevalent under the charter. For example the Sprague family, owners of a mill company employing thousands, manipulatively recruited proxy voters by temporarily granting male employees quitclaim deeds and directing them in how to vote. These deeds were returned to the family the day after the vote.

Opposition to reform was strongest among freemen aligned with the Whig Party, living mainly in the south of the state, while pro-reform freemen often were Democrats, who were mainly in the industrialized north of the state.

== Prelude ==
=== Suffrage Association and Party ===
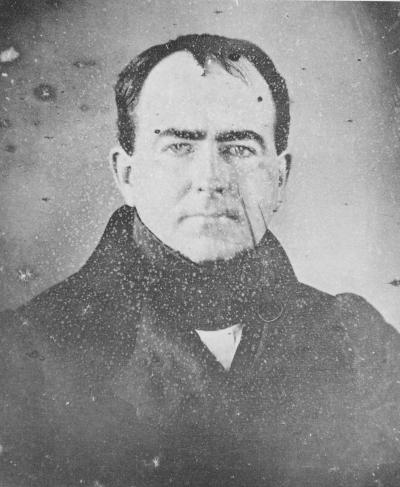
Daguerreotype of Thomas Wilson Dorr, c. 1842

By the fall of 1840, growing agitation for constitutional reform and the expansion of suffrage led to the formation of the Rhode Island Suffrage Party (or people's party) and the Rhode Island Suffrage Association, drawing their support from working and middle class men, as well as sympathetic freemen, notably former Representative Thomas Wilson Dorr and Representative Samuel Y. Atwell. The Suffrage Association established branches throughout the state and, in November 1840, began publishing two newspapers, the New Age and the Daily Express, both of which did not profess a party loyalty.

In response to mounting public pressure, the assembly called for a new constitutional convention in January 1841. This convention, set for November, once again restricted participation to freemen and was mandated to address issues of legislative apportionment, with no mention of suffrage expansion.

Recognizing that they could not expect anything from the proposed convention, the Suffrage Association issued a declaration of principles in February 1841 and called for a mass meeting in Providence on April 12. Additional suffrage meetings were organized throughout the spring and summer of that year. Also, that year, Dorr joined the movement and would eventually become its leader.

=== People's constitution ===
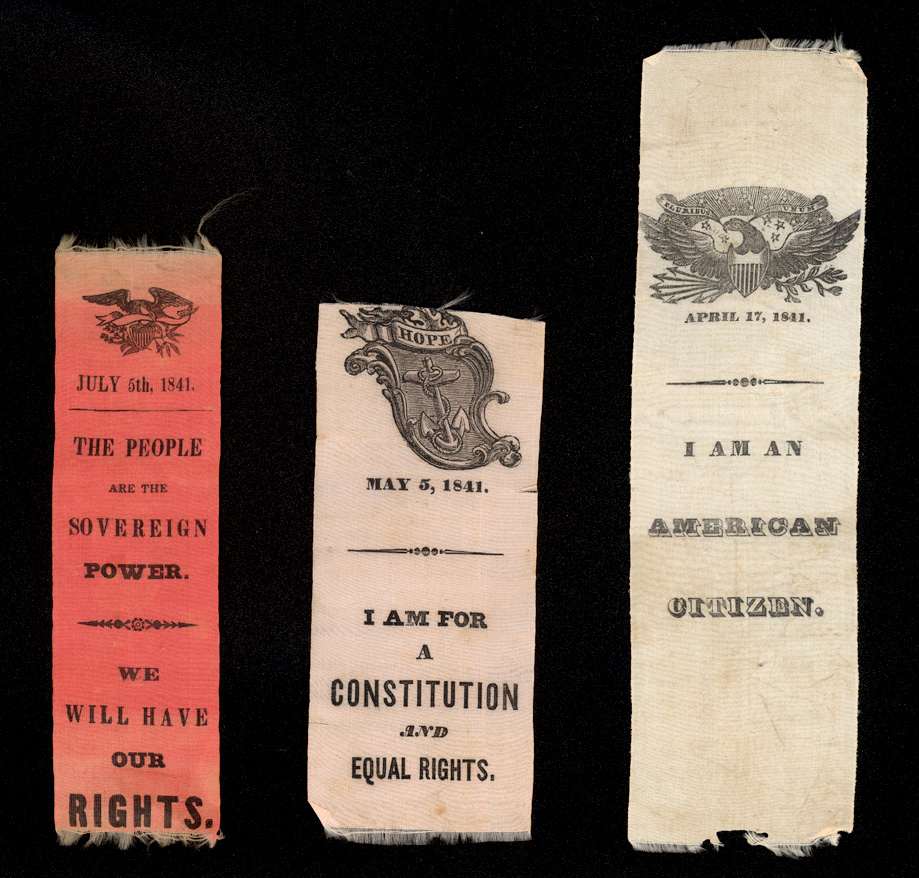
Ribbons worn at mass suffrage meetings in 1841

In July, the Suffrage Party called for adult men to elect delegates the following month to a constitutional convention to be held in Providence. In theory, black men – whose voting rights had been revoked in 1822 – could vote in this election, but in practice they often were excluded.

What became known as the People's Convention convened on 4 October, attracting little attention. The constitution the suffragists drafted introduced a bill of rights, separation of powers, the secret ballot, and new apportionment. While certain public offices were restricted to taxpayers, and only those who owned at least $150 in real estate could vote on issues related to municipal finance, it granted voting rights to all white adult males regardless of property ownership.

Dorr, who headed the committee concerning elections, sought universal male suffrage, reading to the convention a petition given to him on behalf of the black community. The attempt to remove the word "white" was rejected 18 to 46. In response, the Rhode Island Anti-Slavery Society withdrew its support for the Suffrage Association, prompting suffrage advocates to disrupt the Society's meetings. Women, who had actively participated in the suffrage movement, were also denied the vote on a justification based "upon a just consideration of the best good of society including that of the sex itself."

The people's constitution received widespread publicity, making front-page news throughout the state. By the time the landholder's convention (or freemen's convention) was held on November 1, 1841, most freemen were already familiar with the competing document. The constitution this convention drafted was very similar to the other one, introducing a bill of rights, separation of powers, removal of the freeman status, and even a fairer representative system than the other. However, it retained the same property qualifications for voting.

=== Referendum ===
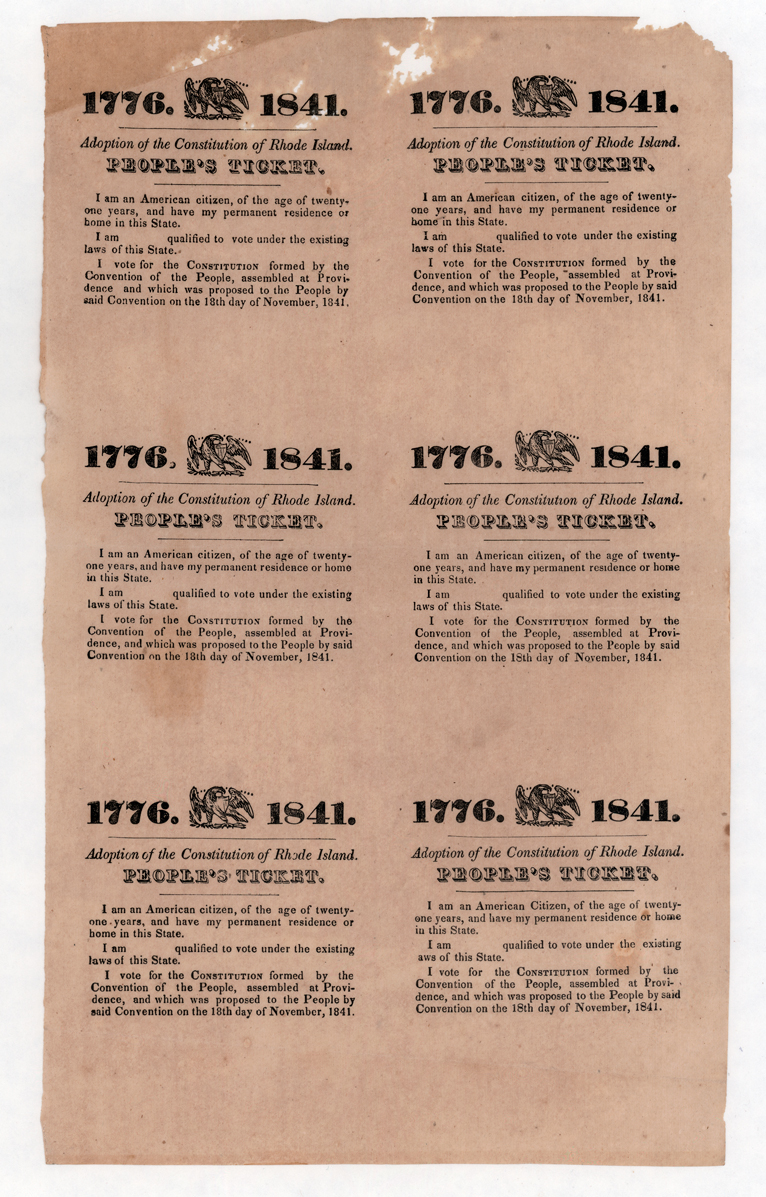
Sheet of the People's tickets in support of the referendum

A three-day referendum on the people's constitution was held starting on December 27. In total, as opposing freemen refused to take part in what they considered an illegal referendum, it received 13,944 votes in favor, with only 52 votes against. The Dorr Rebellion Project lists 13,947 votes in favor. This was out of an estimated 23,142 adult white males, including 9,950 freemen, of whom 4,960 voted on the referendum. With a clear majority of citizens supporting the new constitution, leaders of the Suffrage Party believed that the existing government would eventually step down as it was passed by the will of the people, and so was law.

Governor Samuel Ward King appealed to the judiciary, who argued that political authority resided not in the general population, but within the body politic and its corporate people (freemen), comparing the suffragists to the mobs of the French Revolution. Dorr and his colleagues argued that, following independence, government authority was derived from the people, not the reverse. The freemen used nativist sentiments to sway public opinion against the movement, involving many Irish, whom the old Yankee establishment saw on the same level as blacks.

The freemen constitution, also called the Tory constitution by opponents, was submitted to a formal three-day vote beginning on 21 March 1842. As Dorr had advised suffragist freemen to vote against it, the constitution was rejected 8,689 to 8,013.

=== Algerine Law ===
In 1842, the assembly passed an act deeming all meetings and elections conducted under the people's constitution to be illegal and void. Individuals who permitted their names to be used in these elections could be fined $2,000 and imprisoned for a year; attempting to assume office under the unauthorized government was declared to be treason, punished by life imprisonment. The Dorrites (as they became known) called it "the Algerine Law", alluding to the despotic Dey of Algiers, whose realm had harbored Barbary pirates and slave traders.

King and his followers formed the Law and Order Party of Rhode Island, a coalition of Whigs and conservative Democrats. They reached out for support from President John Tyler and even African Americans, offering the prospect of black suffrage in exchange for loyalty in the brewing conflict. According to one observer at the time, the Law and Order Party held out the possibility "not because it was [the blacks'] right, but because [the Party] needed their help". In response, the Dorrites branded the Law and Order Party the "nigger party".

The severity of the Algerine Law caused many supporters of the People's Convention and constitution to distance themselves from the Suffrage Party, causing significant difficulties in nominating candidates for their upcoming elections. Meanwhile, Tyler refused to get involved in the dispute.

== Course ==
=== Rival government formed ===
The Suffrage Party eventually organized a slate of candidates for their elections, with Dorr as their gubernatorial candidate after three other men had refused the nomination. In the election on April 18, Dorr ran unopposed, receiving all 6,359 votes cast for the race. Two days later, King won reelection 2 to 1 against his Democratic opponent, pulling 4,864 votes. There were now two rival governments, one in Providence and the other in Newport.

On May 3, Inauguration Day, Dorr, protected by at least two militia companies in full uniform armed with loaded rifles, processed the streets of Providence with a crowd of around 2,000 people towards the old statehouse on Benefit Street. When he got there, the door was found to be locked, and it began to rain down on them. According to some historians of the Dorr War, taking possession of the state house at that moment could have provided Dorr's government with a critical show of legitimacy and possibly shifted public opinion in their favor, changing the tide of the rebellion. The new government was forced to relocate to a foundry under construction, where it convened its first legislative session with 66/80 representatives and 9/12 senators present. Welcome B. Sayles was elected speaker of the house.

Quietly supporting the Law and Order government, Tyler reinforced the garrison at Fort Adams with 183 troops, more than doubling the number of men stationed there. They were equipped with forty rounds of ammunition and two days' field rations, and were instructed to be ready for deployment within thirty minutes' notice. However, he wished to only use force as a last resort.

=== Law enforced ===
Starting May 4, the Charter government began initiating a series of arrests under the Algerine Law, including representative from Newport, Daniel Brown, Sayles, Burrington Anthony, the people's Providence County sheriff, Dutee Pearce, an officer of the people's assembly, and several other elected officials from the people's government. In response, the Daily Express published a notice of the arrests, along with the names and addresses of those who ratted them out, as well as the justices who issued the warrants. This was criticised as a hit list. Some anti-suffragists soon had their barns burned down, presumably by Dorrites. The wave of arrests deeply unnerved members of the people's legislature, prompting many to resign from their posts.

Under pressure from his legislature, Dorr joined a delegation to Washington to meet with Tyler, who, while agreeing with Dorr that it was a state matter, told them that he would be obligated to use force if there was violence, and any who resisted or acted against the federal government could be charged with treason. Being dubbed the "Rhode Island Question", debate ensued in both chambers over whether the federal government should intervene, or if it even had the right to do so.

=== Trip back to Rhode Island ===
While returning to Rhode Island, Dorr received a warm reception in New York City, particularly from members of Tammany Hall. He was even invited to the Hall itself, where he delivered a speech declaring his willingness to become a martyr for the suffrage cause. He received promises of support should the federal government intervene militarily, including backing from Mike Walsh and his Spartan Association. Dorr also received the sword of an officer killed in service under General Andrew Jackson from an unknown, possibly Tammany, man. Finally, he was offered a military escort back to Rhode Island, but declined.

During his time there, Dorr eventually agreed to attend a secret meeting brokered by Secretary of State Daniel Webster, a man Dorr had grown tired of in Washington. At the meeting, Dorr met John Whipple, a member of King's delegation to the White House. Whipple proposed a compromise where the Algerine Law might be suspended, and the charter government would remain in power while the United States Circuit Court, which included judges already hostile to the People's Constitution, decide the validity of the document. In exchange, Dorr would be barred from returning to Rhode Island. Dorr flatly rejected the proposal.

On 12 May, during Dorr's absence, King, on the advice of Tyler, gave amnesty to those who renounced the people's government and swore allegiance to the charter government, which many former legislators and supporters did.

=== Attack on the arsenal ===
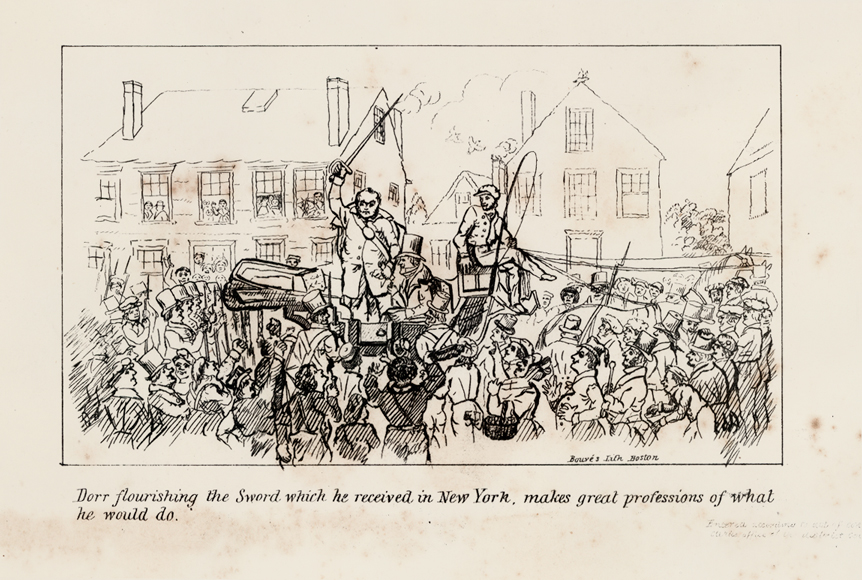
"Dorr flourishing the Sword which he received in New York, makes great professions of what he would do." Dorr delivering a speech outside of Burrington Anthony's home

When Dorr landed by boat in Stonington, Connecticut, he was met by a large crowd of supporters before boarding a train for Providence. Upon his arrival, he was greeted by a crowd of about 3,000, many of whom were armed militiamen. At Anthony's residence in the city, possibly out of increasing desperation, he and his closest allies drafted a plan to storm the nearby state arsenal, which held over 2,000 rifles and muskets, ammunition, and several pieces of heavy artillery. Dorrites then approached the United Train Artillery Company, one of many militia units sympathetic to Dorr. After feigning resistance, the unit handed over a pair of antique 6-pounder cannons.

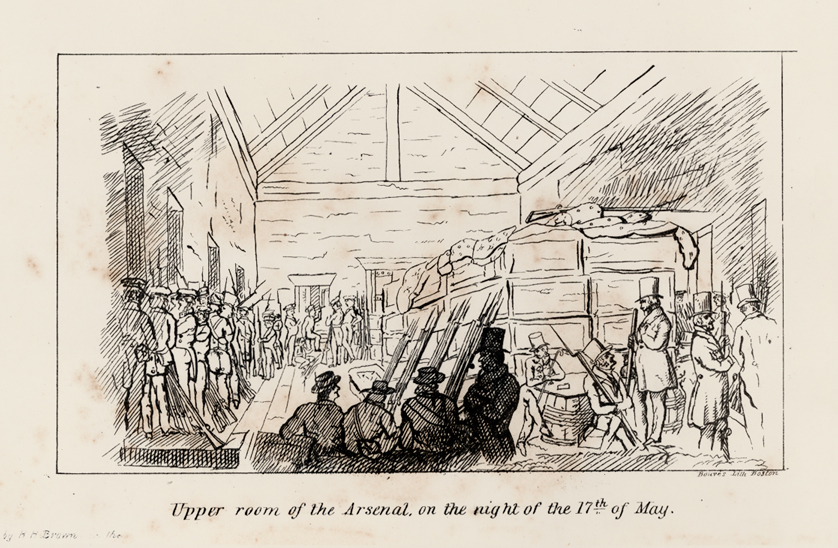
"Upper room of the Arsenal, on the night of the 17th of May."

The plan was poorly concealed, spreading among the "Algerines" as fast as it did the Dorrities, with leaders of both groups telling their followers to be prepared for action. By the night of May 17, the state arsenal had been reinforced by loyal Law and Order militiamen and volunteers, including Dorr's father, brother, and brother in law, and many black men who had supported Dorr before he dropped them from his call for suffrage. King paid a brief and nervous visit to the arsenal to inspect the defenses before departing hastily.

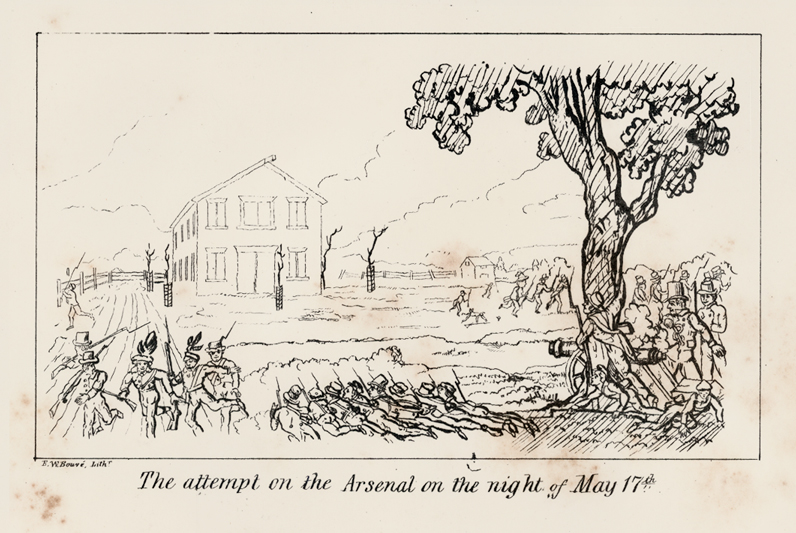
"The attempt on the Arsenal on the night of May 17"

At 1 am, the Dorrites began to assemble. The force, comprising about 300 men, bolstered by groups of volunteers from Pawtucket and Woonsocket, was placed under the command of Colonel Wheeler. Around 1:30, they began to march towards the arsenal, with Dorr and Wheeler at the head. By the time they arrived at around 2:00, their numbers had dwindled slightly, as some men abandoned the cause after realizing the gravity of the situation. Colonel Carter was sent to demand the arsenal's surrender, which was refused. When the heavy artillery on the first floor could be heard being moved and loaded, Colonel Dispeau, commander of the Pawtucket troops, declared he had come to be a military escort, not a military corpse, and ordered his men to withdraw.

Dorr then ordered his two cannons to be fired, both of which failed to do so. There is debate among historians whether this happened because of them being antique pieces, damp gunpowder caused by the misty night, or, as Dorr himself believed, sabotage. Most of Dorr's remaining men deserted, leaving him with only a small group of loyal supporters. As dawn approached, Dorr ordered a retreat. Over the following days, numerous resignations occurred within the people's government. At Anthony's urging, Dorr fled the city.

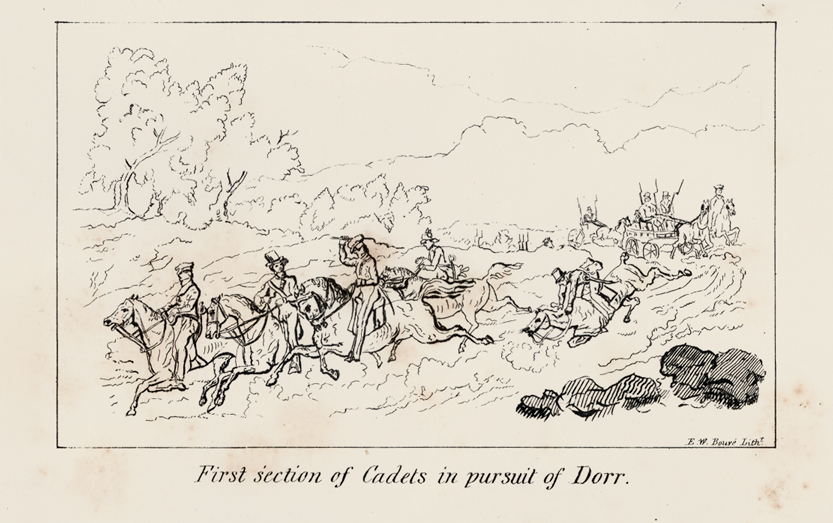
"First section of Cadets in pursuit of Dorr."

Around 9:00, after word of the failed attack spread throughout Providence, King, accompanied by around 700 men and a dozen artillery pieces, came to Anthony's home, which stood atop a slight hill and was defended by several cannons aimed down into the street. A brief, tense standoff ensued as King's men positioned their artillery, and both sides exchanged threats. Ultimately, the Dorrite cannons were withdrawn, and King's forces stormed the house, waving an arrest warrant and demanding that Dorr be surrendered. They pursued him in the wrong direction, and Dorr escaped to Woonsocket. There he had numerous supporters, and spoke briefly of another attempt to take the arsenal, before abandoning any plans and leaving the state. A $1,000 reward was issued for his capture, and two militias of suspicious loyalty, including the United Train Artillery Company, were disbanded, and new, loyal ones were formed.

=== Acote's Hill ===
Fears emerged among anti-suffragists that Dorr intended to return at the head of an army of mercenaries and desperadoes gathered from neighboring states to overthrow the charter government. Nevertheless, Tyler visited the state to assess the situation firsthand but declined to send in federal troops.

While the majority of the people's legislature and upper-class supporters had by then abandoned the cause, a group of diehard blue-collar mechanics who had been behind Dorr from the beginning remained loyal. During the month of June, perhaps clinging to the romance of a lost cause, they held numerous rallies and military processions in hopes of paving the way for their hero's return. There was talk of reconvening the people's legislature, and soon they began to gather at the small village of Chepachet, where they began to dig in at Acote's hill for confrontation. Four men passing through the village were captured by the Dorrites on the suspicion of being Algerine spies, two of whom actually were. The men were forcibly marched to Woonsocket, where they were released the following day. The captors defended their actions as loyal enforcers of the people's constitution, and maintained that 2,000 would arrive to defend the cause.

In response, on June 23, King called for another constitutional convention to be held in September, one that would allow blacks to vote for delegates and float the idea of abolishing the property requirement. In the meantime, given the activity at Chepachet, a failed attempt by some Dorrites to seize some cannon in Warren, and the renewed talk of Dorr's imminent return, the Algerines called for troops. By June 23, a force of 2,500 to 3,000 men, including companies from New York, and supplied with arms and ammunition by the federal government, was encamped in Providence under the command of William Gibbs McNeil. The same day, Dorr returned to Rhode Island and joined his remaining followers. By June 27, the force had grown to 3,500, including 200 black militiamen. Portions of this force were sent to protect the state's borders while the main body advanced towards Acote's Hill. There were also men from Massachusetts.

The site at Acote's Hill had been selected by Jedediah Sprague, a local tavern owner, staunch Dorrite, and the general of a volunteer unit. No more than 300 poorly organized, trained, and equipped men were stationed there, with no one from the original people's government. Additionally, there were several cannons, but ammunition was scarce, and much of it was improperly sized. In place of proper artillery shot, a pile of metal scraps had been gathered. The only out of state reinforcement was Walsh and a dozen members of his Spartan Association. On 27 June, after receiving no reinforcements and realizing the people's government had effectively abandoned him, Dorr convened the council of war with his remaining advisors. Acknowledging the hopelessness of their situation and wishing to avoid unnecessary bloodshed, he issued the order to disband the Dorrite forces.

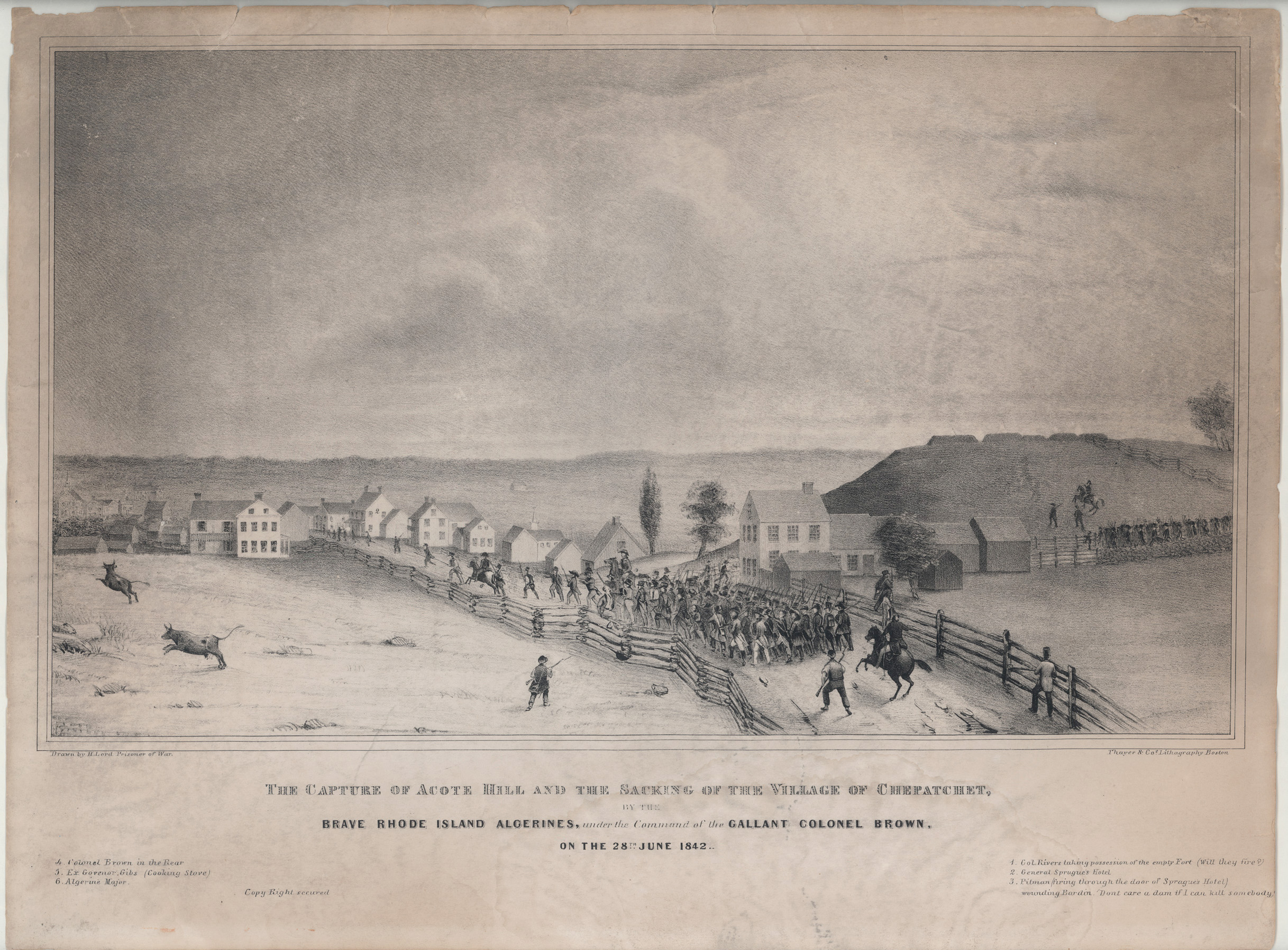
"The capture of Acote Hill and the sacking of the village of Chepatchet, by the brave Rhode Island Algerines, under the Command of the gallant Colonet Brown, on the 28th June 1842." Made by Henry Lord, this was only the first hand depiction of the event

Not informed of this decision, Colonel Brown and his detachment arrived at Acote's Hill on June 28, only to find it abandoned, save for several cannons and a Providence merchant who informed a team that went ahead that the Dorrites had already dispersed. That team then stormed the hill, found nothing, declared victory, and arrested the man. Frustrated by their anticlimactic arrival, the troops began arresting civilians indiscriminately, detaining 100 to 200 mostly innocent people, labelling them prisoners to save face. The troops then occupied Sprague's tavern, where a scuffle broke out, resulting in one guest being shot by a soldier. The tavern was then looted for food and cigars. That same day, Law and Order men in Cumberland stabbed a woman in the hand, while in Pawtucket, at the border, Kentish Guards fired at civilians on the Massachusetts side, killing one.

As Brown's men marched their "prisoners of war" back to Providence, two brothers in Brown's force got into an argument, leading to one killing the other. Some members of the force even proposed executing the prisoners before they were put into prison; some remained there through July.

== Aftermath ==
=== Hunt for Dorr ===
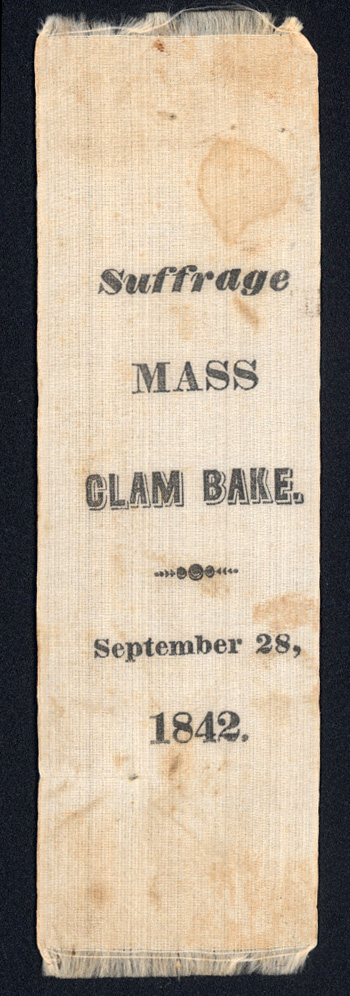
Suffrage Association Clambake ribbon

King issued a warrant for Dorr's arrest with a reward of $5,000. Several clambake gatherings were held by women in support of him. The governors of Massachusetts and New York agreed to extradite Dorr if located, while the governors of Connecticut and New Hampshire refused, arguing that King was attempting to punish a political opponent. The latter governor, a Democrat and Dorr ally, referred to King as an acting governor and even allowed Dorr to stay with him. Dorr moved relatively freely across New England, and at one point even returned briefly to Providence.

In late November, Rhode Island voted on the Law and Order constitution, giving 7,024 votes in favor and only 51 votes against. The new document included a bill of rights, separation of powers, reapportionment based on population, and suffrage for blacks and all native-born adult males. Naturalized citizens were still required to meet the $134 property requirement to vote. However, Narragansett Indians were prohibited from voting. Voters had to pay a poll tax of $1, which would go to support public schools in the state.

On October 31, 1843, Dorr arrived in Providence and nonchalantly entered the City Hotel, requesting a room. When none were available, he crossed the street to the home of Simmons, editor of the sympathetic Republican Herald. He was promptly arrested in the street, taken into custody, and incarcerated in the state prison, where many of his followers were also being held. He was charged with treason under the Algerine Law.

=== Increased voting and liberation ===
In the 1844 United States presidential election (the next held after the Dorr Rebellion), 12,296 votes were cast, a significant increase from the 8,621 cast in the 1840 election.

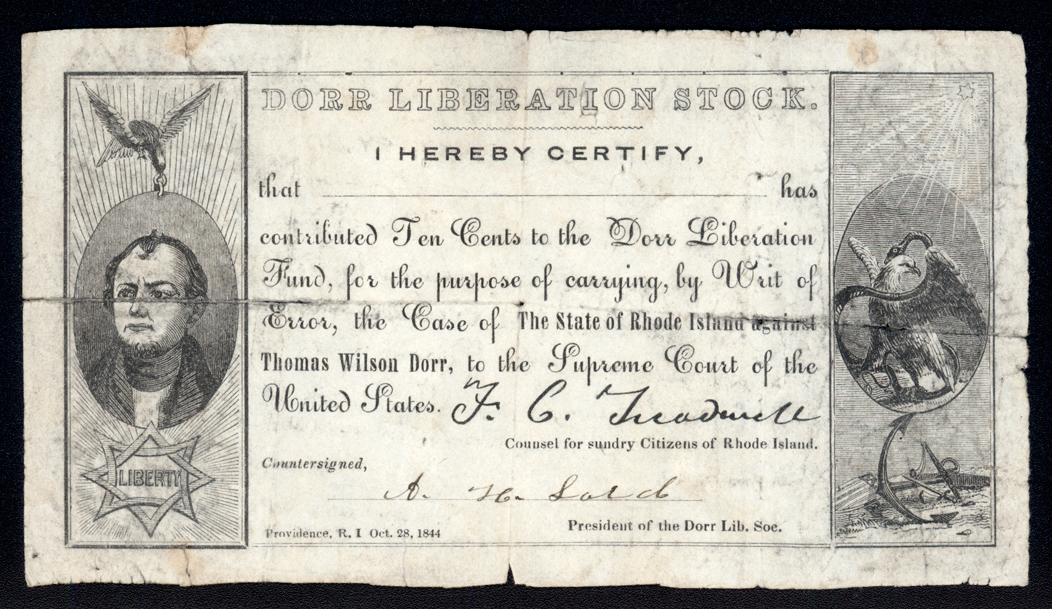
A Dorr Liberation Stock certificate

Dorr's arrest elevated his status to that of a martyr, gradually increasing public sympathy for his cause. The Dorr Liberation Society was formed, which began selling "Liberation Stock" to raise funds in the hopes of bringing his case before the Supreme Court. His parents and an uncle, who had fought against him, petitioned for his release. After much debate, it was decided in January 1845 to offer Dorr his freedom on the condition that he took an oath of allegiance, which he refused to do.

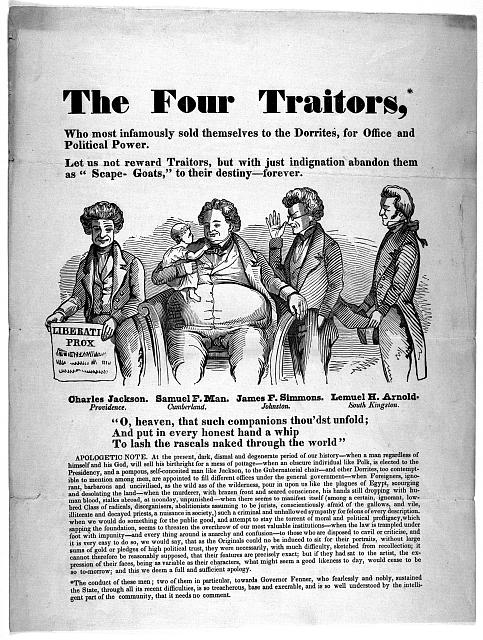
An illustrated broadside denouncing Whig politicians who worked with Democrats to secure Dorr's freedom in 1845

His continued imprisonment became a major issue in the 1845 Rhode Island gubernatorial election. The Liberation candidate, Charles Jackson, beat the Law and Order candidate. On June 27, 1845, the assembly passed An Act to Pardon Certain Offenses Against the Sovereign Power of this State and to Quiet the Minds of the Good People Thereof, releasing him. He was greeted by a cheering crowd. Several cannons on Smith Hill and nearby Federal Hill were fired in a salute for Dorr.

=== Court case ===
In Luther v. Borden (1849), the Supreme Court of the United States held that the constitutional right to change governments was unquestioned, but that the Supreme Court did not have the authority to interfere because the Constitutional guarantee of a "republican form of government" was a political question best left to the other branches of the federal government.

== Interpretations ==
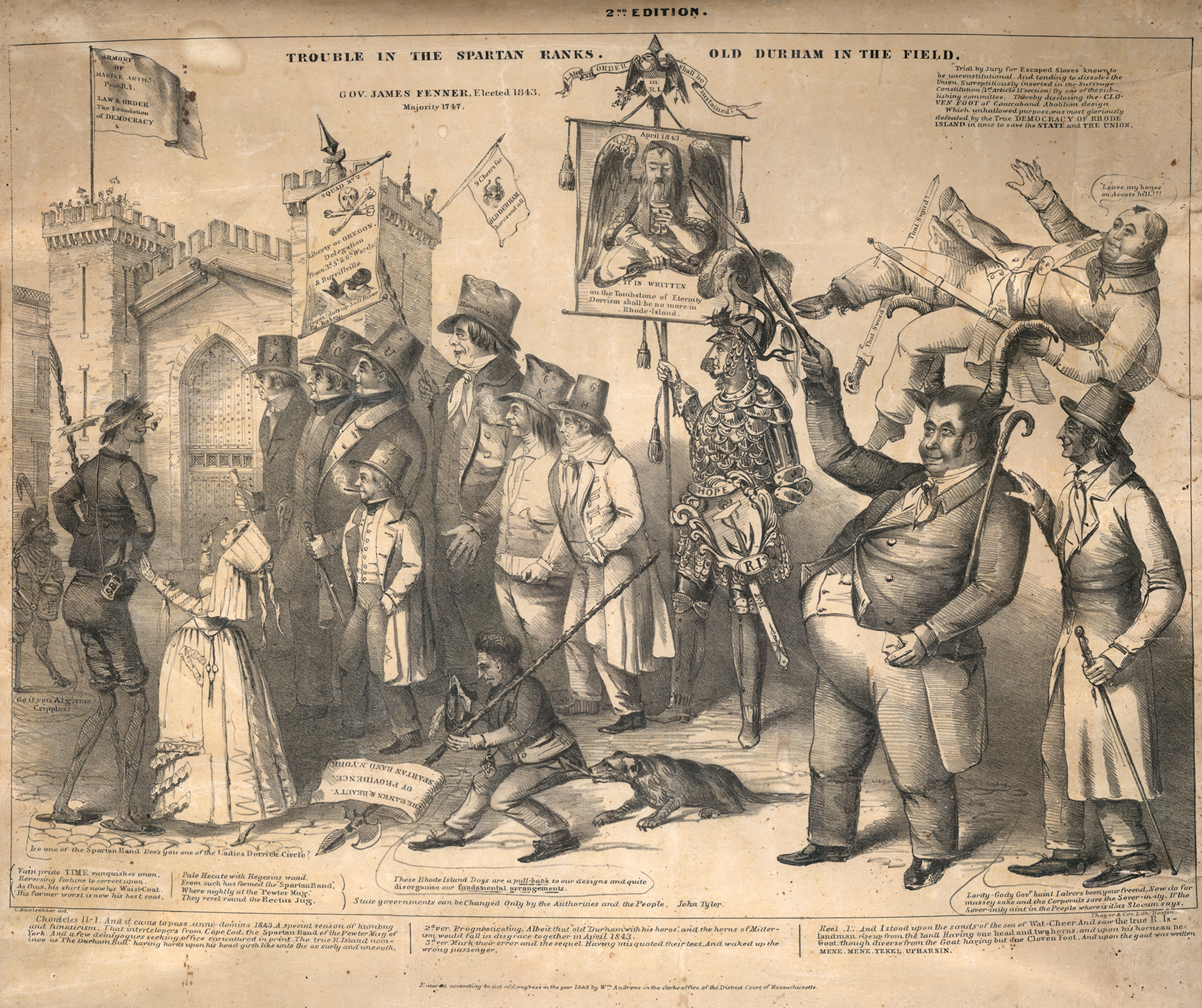
"Trouble in the Spartan Ranks." 1843 Anti-Dorrite satirical cartoon with cartoonish depictions of a number of Dorrites situated before the arsenal. Governor James Fenner is shown on the right as a stout man with horns on his head; atop the horns with a cloven hoof is Thomas Dorr.

Historians have long debated the meaning and nature of the rebellion.

Mowry (1901) portrayed the Dorrites as irresponsible idealists who ignored the state's need for stability and order. Gettleman (1973) hailed it as an early working-class attempt to overthrow an elitist government. Dennison (1976) saw it as a legitimate expression of Republicanism in the United States, but concluded that politics changed little for Rhode Islanders after 1842 because the same elite groups ruled the state.

However, in 1854, the Rhode Island Supreme Court wrote: "the union of all the powers of government in the same hands is but the definition of despotism". Thus, the same Court that convicted Dorr of treason against the charter in 1844 ruled ten years later that the charter had improperly authorized a despotic, non-republican, un-American form of government. Coleman (1963) explored the complex coalition that supported Dorr, noting that the changing economic structure of the state caused the middle classes, the poor farmers, and the industrialists to mostly peel off after the 1843 Constitution gave in to their demands. The factory workers remained but were too few and too poorly organized to do much. He identifies Seth Luther as one of the few stalwarts from the working class.

Coleman concludes that the timidity of the Dorrites in 1842 was a reflection of their fragile coalition. Looking at Dorr himself, Coleman (1976) argued: "At several crucial moments the suffragists were offered, but rejected, every reform they asked for. Indeed, the constitution they were offered even went beyond their demands. But Dorr would have no part of it; the process of formulation was flawed. It did not conform to his concept of popular sovereignty. Compromise was out of the question. Principle became all. Dorr hungered for the vindication of principle. He was determined to lead his supporters into martyrdom."

Henry Bowen Anthony wrote a poetical satire of the events, which was published without attribution in Boston by Justin Jones in 1842. It was republished in 1870, again without attribution to Anthony, along with another work concerning the events entitled The Dorriad, and The Great Slocum Dinner, by Sidney S. Rider & Brother, Providence.

== See also ==
- Alfred Niger
- List of incidents of civil unrest in the United States
- Luther v. Borden
