= Governor Jackson =

Governor Jackson may refer to:

- Andrew Jackson (1767–1845), 1st Territorial Governor of Florida
- Charles Jackson (Rhode Island politician) (1797–1876), 18th Governor of Rhode Island
- Claiborne Fox Jackson (1806–1862), 15th Governor of Missouri
- Edward L. Jackson (1873–1954), 32nd Governor of Indiana
- Elihu Emory Jackson (1837–1907), 41st Governor of Maryland
- Frank D. Jackson (1854–1938), 15th Governor of Iowa
- Frederick John Jackson (1859–1929), Governor of Uganda from 1911 to 1918
- Hancock Lee Jackson (1796–1876), 13th Governor of Missouri
- Henry Jackson (colonial administrator) (1849–1908), 31st Governor of the Leeward Islands
- Jacob B. Jackson (1829–1893), 6th Governor of West Virginia
- James Jackson (Georgia politician) (1757–1806), 23rd Governor of Georgia
- Stanley Jackson (cricketer) (1870–1947), Governor of Bengal from 1927 to 1932
- Wilfrid Edward Francis Jackson (1883–1971), Governor of Mauritius from 1930 to 1937, Governor of British Guiana from 1937 to 1941, and Governor of Tanganyika from 1941 to 1945
- William Jackson (British Army officer) (1917–1999), Governor of Gibraltar from 1978 to 1982
