= 1848 Rhode Island gubernatorial election =

- April 5, 1848
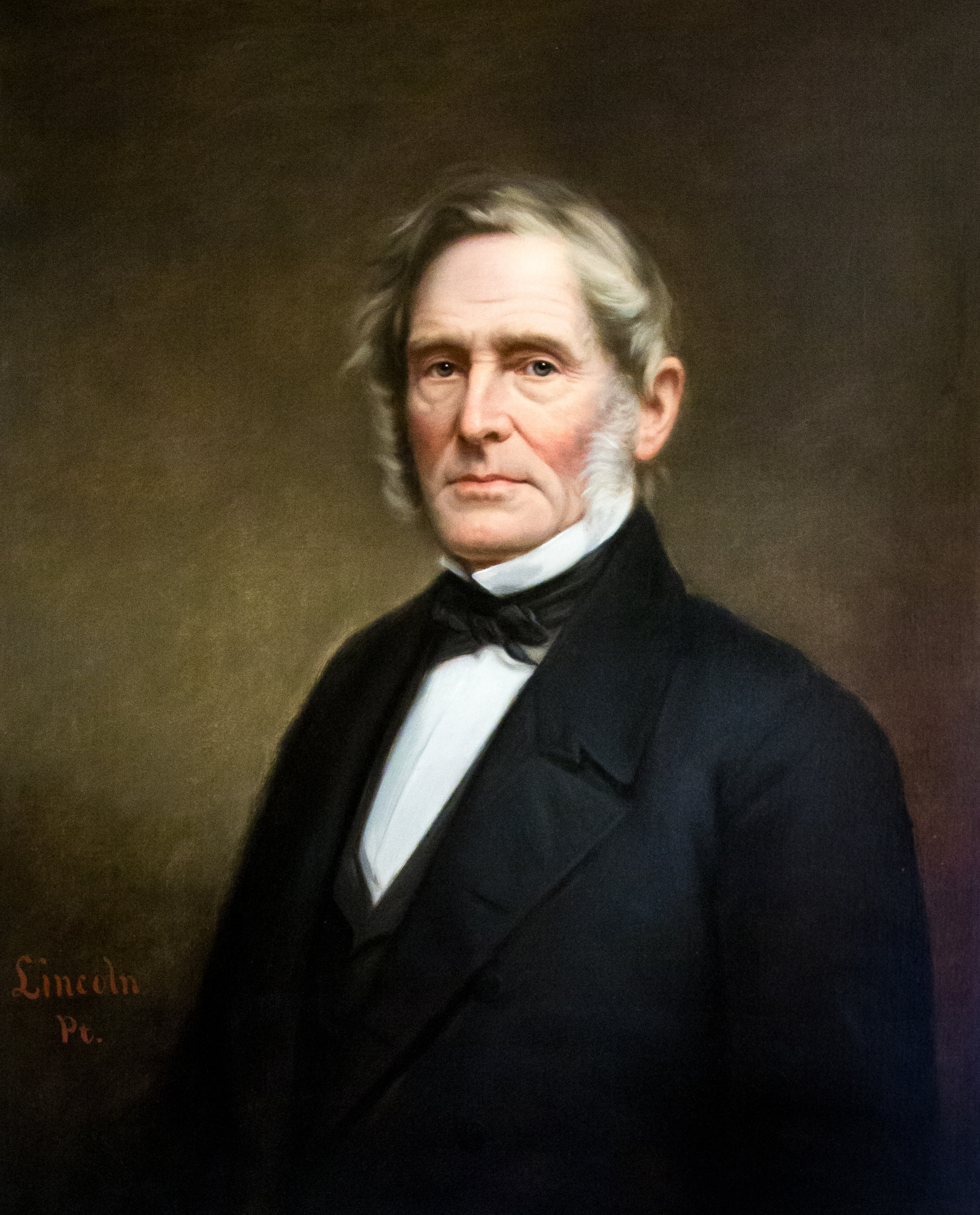

| Nominee | Elisha Harris | Adnah Sackett |
| Party | Whig | Democratic |
| Popular vote | 5,695 | 3,683 |
| Percentage | 58.02% | 37.52% |
- County results Harris: 50–60% 60–70% 80–90%
Governor before election
Elisha Harris
Whig
Elected Governor
Elisha Harris
Whig

The 1848 Rhode Island gubernatorial election was held on April 5, 1848.

Incumbent Whig governor Elisha Harris won re-election to a second term, defeating Democratic nominee Adnah Sackett.

== General election ==
=== Candidates ===
- Adnah Sackett, Democratic, manufacturer of jewelry. Sackett was nominated after Olney Ballou declined the nomination.
- Elisha Harris, Whig, incumbent governor

=== Results ===
1848 Rhode Island gubernatorial election (Note: OurCampaigns gives the result as Harris 5,795, Sackett 3,683, scattering 446.)
| Party | Candidate | Votes | % | ±% |
|---|---|---|---|---|
| Whig | Elisha Harris (incumbent) | 5,695 | 58.02% | |
| Democratic | Adnah Sackett | 3,683 | 37.52% | |
| Scattering | | 437 | 4.45% | |
| Majority | | 2,012 | 20.50% | |
| Turnout | | 9,815 | | |
| Whig hold | | Swing | | |
