= Interlaken Mill Bridge =

- U.S. National Register of Historic Places
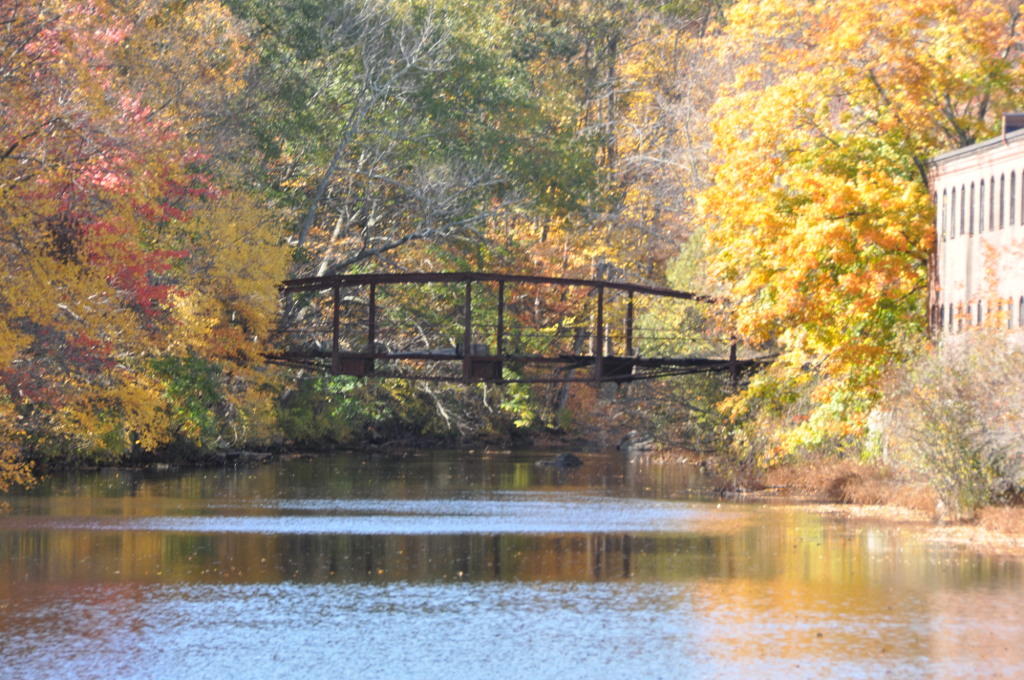

- Location within Rhode Island Location within the United States
- Location: Coventry, Rhode Island
- Coordinates: 41°43′41″N 71°32′39″W
- Built: 1885
- Architect: Berlin Iron Bridge Co.
- NRHP reference No.: 78000064
- Added to NRHP: December 22, 1978

The Interlaken Mill Bridge is an historic bridge spanning the Pawtuxet River at the site of the former Arkwright and Interlaken mill complexes in Coventry, Rhode Island. The lenticular pony truss bridge was built in 1885 by the Interlaken Corporation to provide a direct connection between the mill sites, having recently (1883) acquired the Arkwright property. The trusses were manufactured by the Berlin Iron Bridge Co. of Berlin, Connecticut. The bridge is a single span measuring 92 feet (28 m) in length and just under 19 feet (5.8 m) in width, resting on stone abutments.

The bridge was listed on the National Register of Historic Places in 1978. It is the only known lenticular pony truss bridge in Rhode Island.

As of 2015, the bridge is completely closed off to the public and no longer maintained. It has fallen into severe disrepair and is structurally unsound and unsafe to cross. With the closing and abandonment of the facilities on the south side of the river, and the eventual reclamation of nature to the location, the south side of the bridge leads only to thick woods and brush.

== See also ==
- National Register of Historic Places listings in Kent County, Rhode Island
- List of bridges on the National Register of Historic Places in Rhode Island
