= Elisha Harris =

American politician

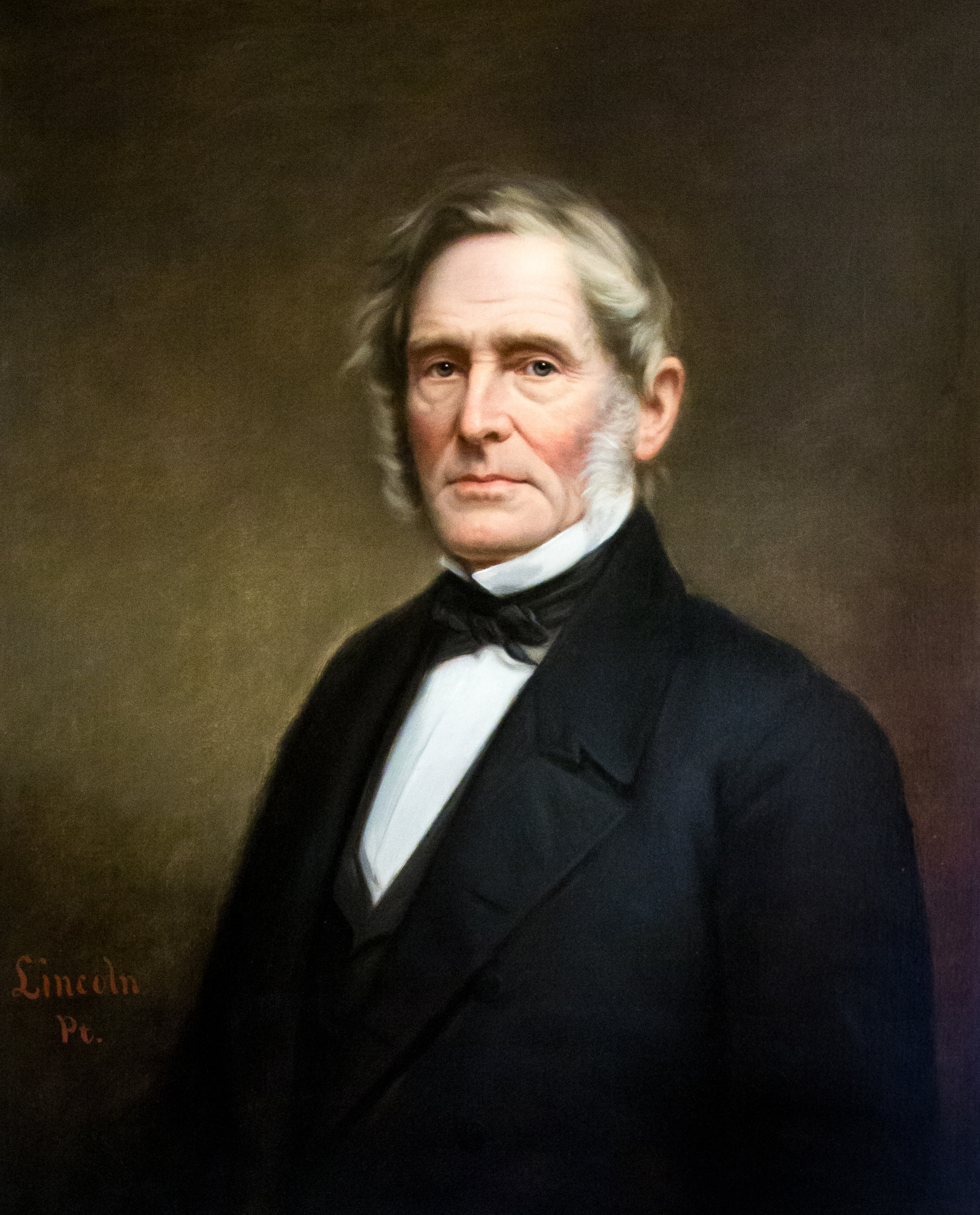
- Official State House portrait by James Sullivan Lincoln

20th Governor of Rhode Island
- In office May 4, 1847 – May 1, 1849
- Lieutenant Governor: Edward W. Lawton
- Preceded by: Byron Diman
- Succeeded by: Henry B. Anthony

Lieutenant Governor of Rhode Island
- In office May 6, 1846 – May 4, 1847
- Governor: Byron Diman
- Preceded by: Byron Diman
- Succeeded by: Edward W. Lawton

Member of the Rhode Island House of Representatives

Personal details
- Born: September 8, 1791 Cranston, Rhode Island, U.S.
- Died: February 1, 1861 (aged 69) Coventry, Rhode Island, U.S.
- Resting place: Greenwood Cemetery in Coventry, Rhode Island
- Party: Whig, Republican
- Profession: Mill Owner, Banker

Elisha Harris (September 8, 1791 – February 1, 1861) of Coventry, Kent County, Rhode Island, was Lieutenant Governor of Rhode Island, 1846–47 serving under Governor Byron Diman and the 20th governor of Rhode Island 1847–49.

== Biography ==
Harris was born in Cranston, Providence County, Rhode Island. He attended the local schools and the East Greenwich Seminary. He then embarked on a business career, working initially as a bookkeeper. He eventually became an owner of several manufacturing companies, banks and other enterprises, including serving as President of the Bank of North America in Providence, and operating the Harris Mill in the Harris.

Active in politics as a Whig, Harris served several terms in the Rhode Island House of Representatives. He served as lieutenant governor from 1846 until 1847. In 1847 he became governor, and he served one term, 1847 to 1849. He was an unsuccessful candidate for reelection in 1848, and for election as governor in 1850. Harris became a Republican when the party was founded in the mid-1850s, and he was a presidential elector in 1860.

Harris died in Coventry and was buried at Greenwood Cemetery in Coventry.

Henry Howard, who also served as governor, was married to Harris's daughter Catherine.

Party political offices
Vacant Title last held by Samuel Ward King	Whig nominee for Governor of Rhode Island; 1847, 1848	Succeeded by Henry B. Anthony
Political offices
Preceded by Byron Diman	Governor of Rhode Island; 1847–1849	Succeeded by Henry B. Anthony
