= 1841 Rhode Island gubernatorial election =

- April 21, 1841
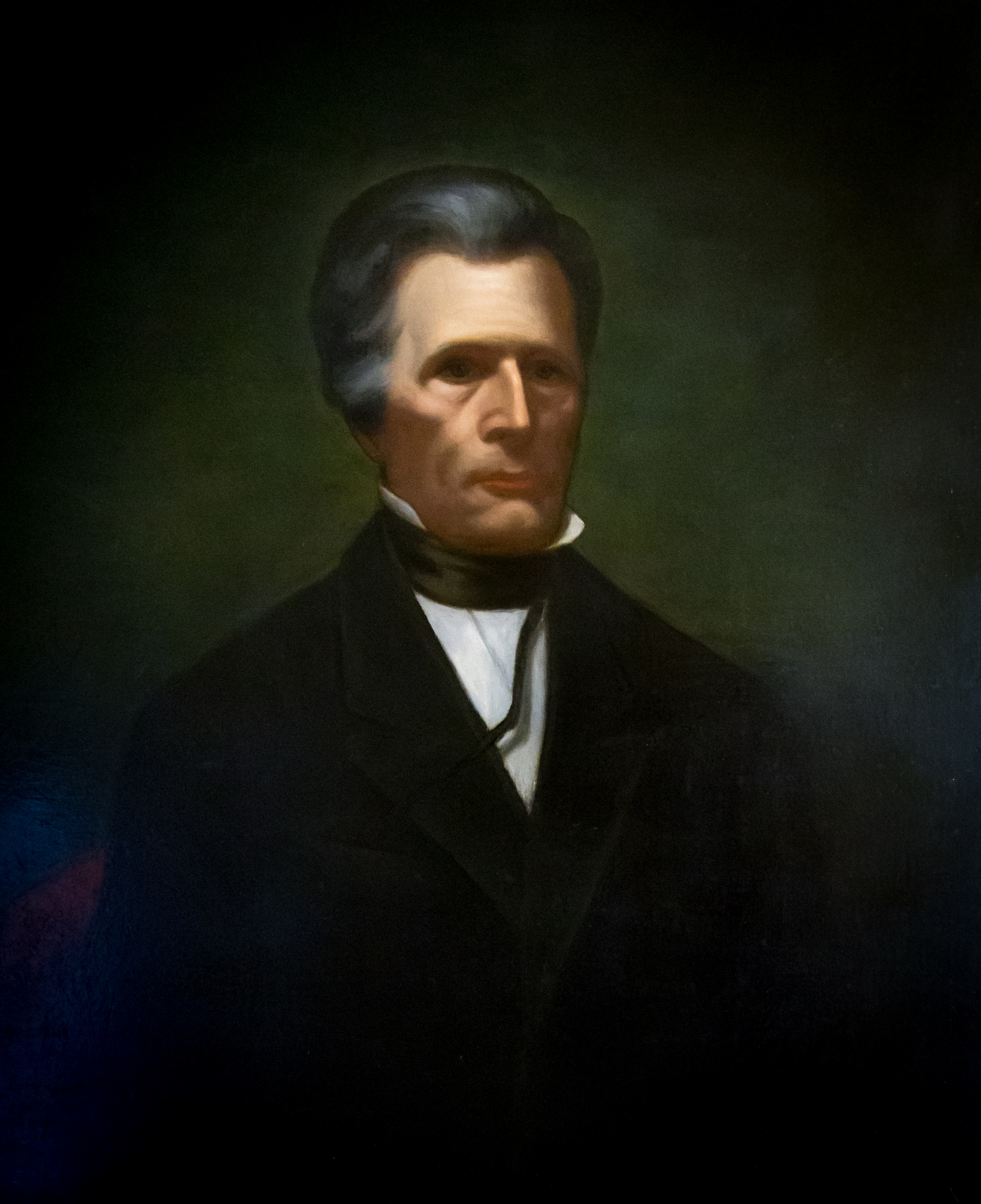
Nominee	Samuel Ward King
Party	Whig
Popular vote	2,648
Percentage	97.68%
- County results King: 90–100%
Governor before election
Samuel Ward King
Whig
Elected Governor
Samuel Ward King
Whig

The 1841 Rhode Island gubernatorial election was held on April 21, 1841.

Incumbent Whig governor Samuel Ward King won re-election without opposition.

== General election ==
=== Candidates ===
- Samuel Ward King, Whig, incumbent governor

=== Results ===
1841 Rhode Island gubernatorial election
Party	Candidate	Votes	%	±%
Whig	Samuel Ward King (incumbent)	2,648	97.68%	
Scattering		63	2.32%	
Majority		2,585	95.36%	
Turnout		2,711		
Whig hold		Swing		
