= Harris Mill =

- U.S. National Register of Historic Places
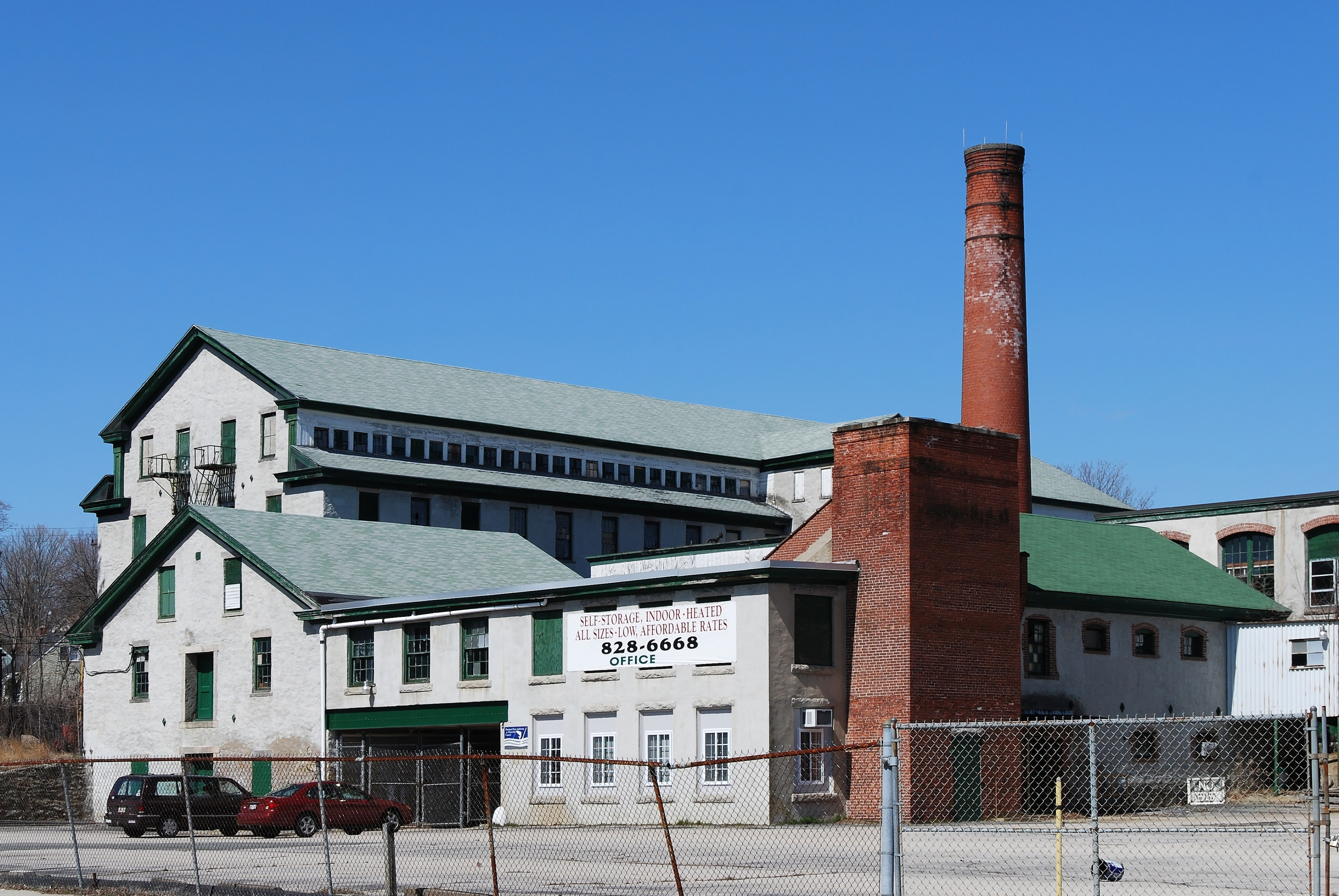

- Location within Rhode Island Location within the United States
- Location: 618 Main St., Coventry, Rhode Island
- Coordinates: 41.7254°N 71.5361°W
- Area: 4.3 acres (1.7 ha)
- Built: 1850
- Architectural style: Greek Revival
- Website: www.harrismilllofts.com
- NRHP reference No.: 07000761
- Added to NRHP: July 27, 2007

The Harris Mill, also known as the Interlaken Mills and now the Harris Mill Lofts, is a historic mill complex at 618 Main Street in the Harris village of Coventry, Rhode Island. This complex of ten buildings occupies a 4.3-acre (1.7 ha) parcel adjacent to the North Branch of the Pawtuxet River. The oldest portion of the main mill building dates to 1850, with a major expansion added in 1870. The mill was founded by Elisha Harris, who had recently served as Governor of Rhode Island, and produced cotton twill cloth. It was acquired by Interlaken Mills in 1900, for whom it had been a major supplier, and was operated until 1953. In 2014, the long abandoned mill was restored and renovated into an apartment complex.

The mill was listed on the National Register of Historic Places in 2007.

== See also ==
- Interlaken Mill Bridge
- National Register of Historic Places listings in Kent County, Rhode Island
