= 1840 Rhode Island gubernatorial election =

- April 15, 1840
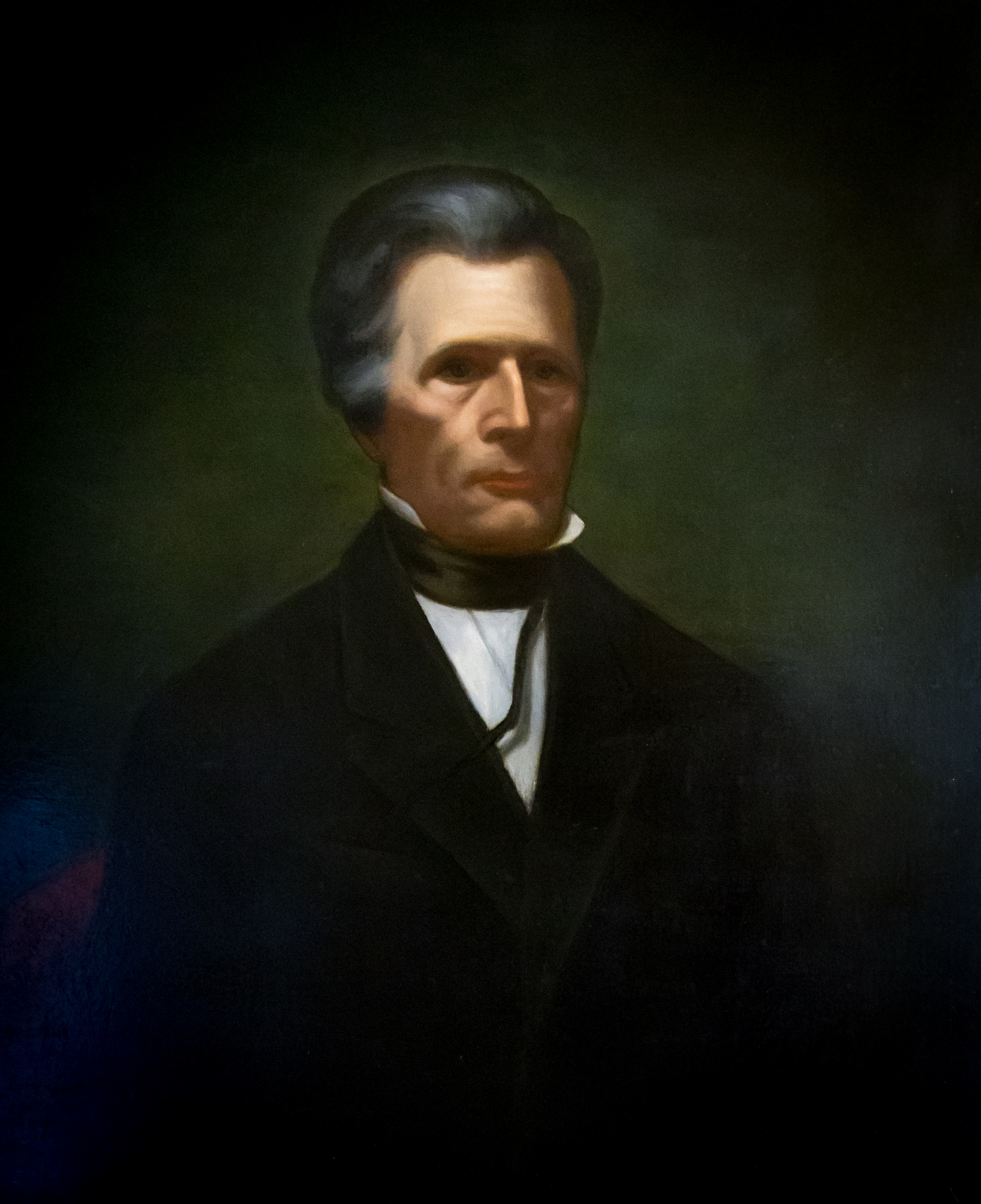

Nominee	Samuel Ward King	Thomas F. Carpenter
Party	Whig	Democratic
Popular vote	4,797	3,418
Percentage	57.91%	41.27%
- County results King: 50–60% 60–70% 70–80% Carpenter: 50–60%
Governor before election
Samuel Ward King (acting)
Whig
Elected Governor
Samuel Ward King
Whig

The 1840 Rhode Island gubernatorial election was held on April 15, 1840.

Incumbent Whig acting governor Samuel Ward King won election in his own right, defeating Democratic nominee Thomas F. Carpenter.

== General election ==
=== Candidates ===
- Thomas F. Carpenter, Democratic, attorney
- Samuel Ward King, Whig, acting governor

=== Results ===
1840 Rhode Island gubernatorial election (Note: Some sources give Carpenter's vote as 3,417.)
Party	Candidate	Votes	%	±%
Whig	Samuel Ward King (incumbent)	4,797	57.91%	
Democratic	Thomas F. Carpenter	3,418	41.27%	
Scattering		68	0.82%	
Majority		1,379	16.65%	
Turnout		8,283		
Whig hold		Swing		
