= Samuel Ward King =

American politician

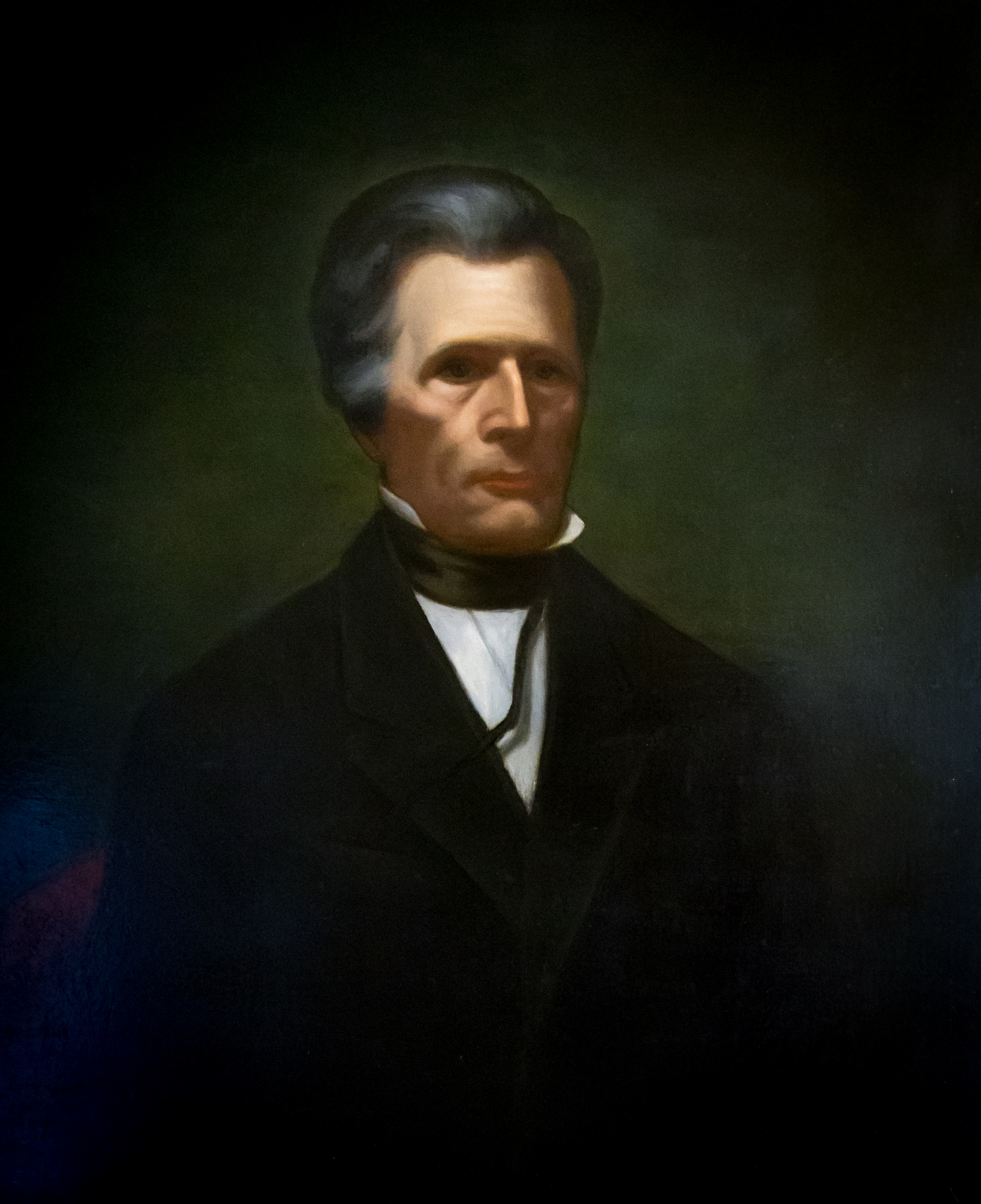

15th Governor of Rhode Island
- In office May 2, 1839 – May 1, 1843
- Lieutenant: Byron Diman
- Preceded by: William Sprague III
- Succeeded by: James Fenner

Personal details
- Born: May 23, 1786 Johnston, Rhode Island
- Died: January 20, 1851 (aged 64) Providence, Rhode Island, U.S.
- Resting place: King family plot, Johnston, Rhode Island
- Party: Whig
- Other political affiliations: Law and Order
- Spouse: Catherine Latham Angell
- Profession: Physician

Samuel Ward King (May 23, 1786 – January 20, 1851) was the 15th governor of Rhode Island from 1839 to 1843.

== Biography ==
Samuel Ward King was born in Johnston, Rhode Island to William Borden King and Welthian Walton King.

King attended Brown University but did not graduate. He became a medical doctor and worked as a surgeon during the War of 1812.

In 1820, King was elected town clerk of Johnston. He became a Whig when the party was founded, and was a presidential elector in 1832. In 1838, he was elected to the Rhode Island Senate. He first became governor in 1839 when the legislature failed to grant a majority of votes to the three leading contenders. He was elected to three other terms.

During his administration as governor, he took a strong stand against the expanded voting franchise that led to the Dorr Rebellion in 1841 – 1842. President John Tyler refused to send in Federal troops at Governor King's request to suppress the uprising.

King married Catherine Latham Angell, with whom he had 14 children. He is buried in the King family plot in Johnston near the intersection of US Route 6A and Killingly Street.

Party political offices
Preceded by William Sprague III	Whig nominee for Governor of Rhode Island; 1840, 1841, 1842	Vacant Title next held by Elisha Harris
Political offices
Preceded by William Sprague III	Governor of Rhode Island; 1839–1843	Succeeded by James Fenner
