= Charles Jackson (Rhode Island politician) =

American politician (1797–1876)

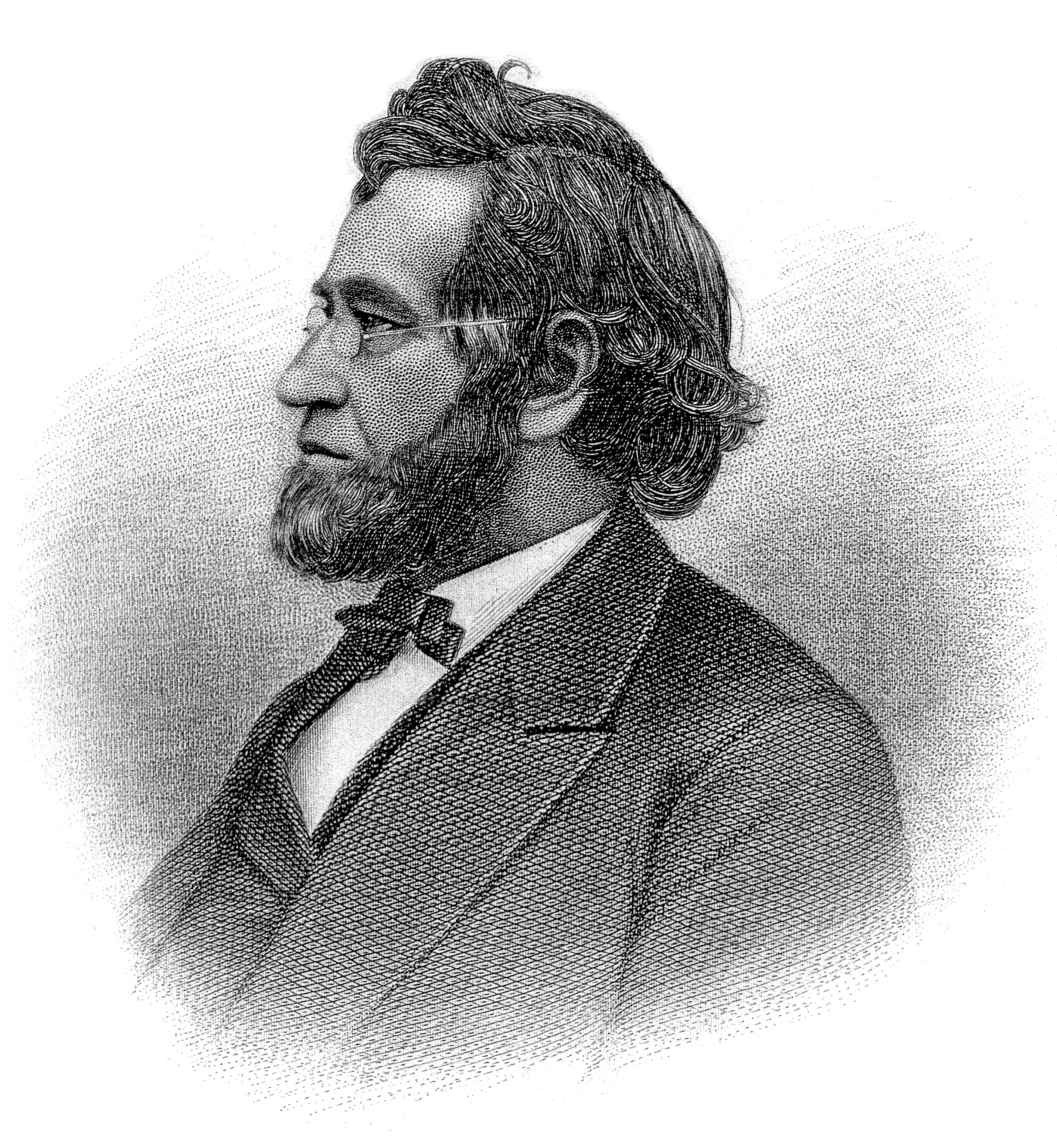

18th Governor of Rhode Island
- In office May 6, 1845 – May 6, 1846
- Lieutenant Governor: Byron Diman
- Preceded by: James Fenner
- Succeeded by: Byron Diman

Speaker of the Rhode Island House of Representatives
- In office 1841–1842
- Preceded by: Henry Y. Cranston
- Succeeded by: Richard K. Randolph

Member of the Rhode Island House of Representatives from Providence
- In office 1839–1842 Serving with various (multi-member district)
- Preceded by: Various (multi-member district)
- Succeeded by: Various (multi-member district)

Personal details
- Born: March 4, 1797 Providence, Rhode Island
- Died: January 21, 1876 (aged 78) Providence, Rhode Island
- Resting place: North Burial Ground
- Party: Whig, Liberation Party
- Spouse(s): Catharine Dexter; Phebe Tisdale
- Education: Brown University
- Profession: Lawyer, Businessman

Charles Jackson (March 4, 1797 – January 21, 1876) was the 18th governor of Rhode Island from 1845 to 1846.

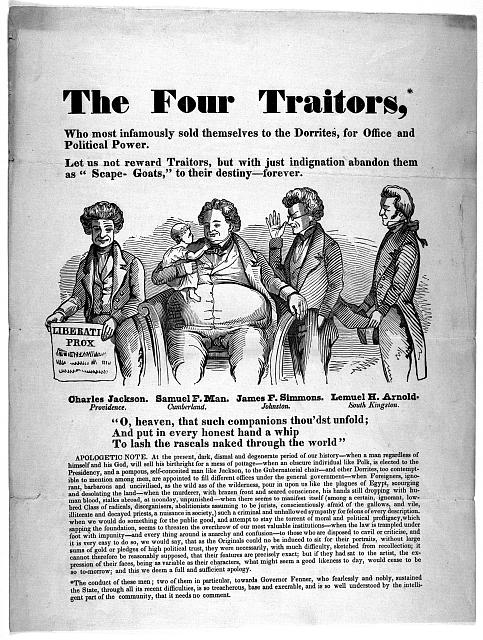
Political cartoon attacking Charles Jackson and others for freeing those convicted in the Dorr Rebellion.

== Early life ==
Jackson was born in Providence, Rhode Island, on March 4, 1797, and was the son of Richard Jackson, Jr. He graduated from Brown University in 1817, and received a master's degree in 1820. He also studied law with James Burrill, Jr., and was admitted to the bar in 1820.

== Business career ==
In addition to practicing law, Jackson was involved in several businesses, including a cotton manufacturing company. He also built a rubber factory after acquiring patent rights from Charles Goodyear. Jackson's ventures proved successful, and he later expanded into firearms as operator of the Burnside Rifle Works and a company that manufactured railroad equipment.

== Political career ==
Jackson was active in politics as a Whig, served several terms in the Rhode Island House of Representatives, and was Speaker from 1841 to 1842. In 1843 he was a delegate to the state constitutional convention.

Jackson served as governor from 1845 to 1846, after defeating incumbent James Fenner. He was elected as a Whig identified with the Liberation movement, which advocated freedom for those imprisoned as a result of the Dorr Rebellion. Jackson signed a bill freeing rebellion leader Thomas Wilson Dorr and all others who had been convicted. In response, Whig opponents of freeing Dorr organized a "Law & Order Party." Jackson was nominated for governor by the Democrats, and was defeated by Lieutenant Governor Byron Diman.

In 1857 Jackson was an unsuccessful candidate for the United States Senate.

== Death and burial ==
Jackson died in Providence on January 21, 1876. He was buried at North Burial Ground in Providence.

== Family ==
Jackson was married twice. His first wife was Catherine Dexter (1805–1832), whom he married in 1827. In 1836 he married Phebe Tisdale (died March 3, 1883) of Scituate, Rhode Island. He had seven children, five of whom lived to adulthood.

Party political offices
Vacant Title last held by Thomas F. Carpenter	Democratic nominee for Governor of Rhode Island; 1846	Succeeded by Olney Ballou
Political offices
Preceded by James Fenner	Governor of Rhode Island; 1845–1846	Succeeded by Byron Diman
