= Byron Diman =

American politician

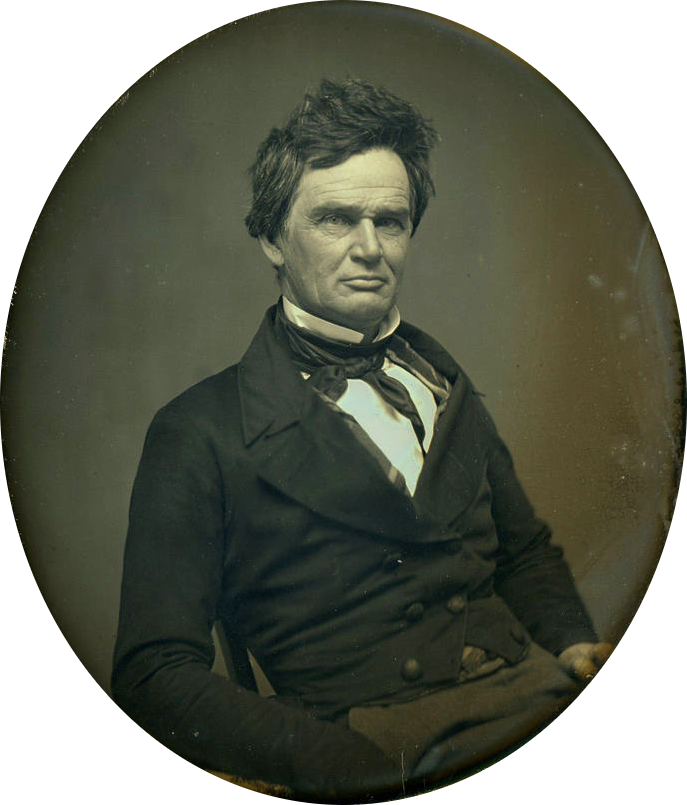

19th Governor of Rhode Island
- In office May 6, 1846 – May 4, 1847
- Preceded by: Charles Jackson
- Succeeded by: Elisha Harris

Lieutenant Governor of Rhode Island
- In office 1843–1846
- Governor: James Fenner; Charles Jackson
- Preceded by: Joseph Childs
- Succeeded by: Nathanael Bullock
- In office 1840–1842
- Governor: Samuel Ward King
- Preceded by: Joseph Childs
- Succeeded by: Nathanael Bullock

Member of the Rhode Island House of Representatives

Personal details
- Born: August 5, 1795 Bristol, Rhode Island, U.S.
- Died: August 1, 1865 (aged 69)
- Resting place: Juniper Hill Cemetery, Bristol, Rhode Island, U.S.
- Party: Law and Order
- Spouse(s): Abigal Alden Wight, Elizabeth Ann Wood

Military service
- Branch/service: Rhode Island Militia
- Rank: Brigadier General

Byron Diman (August 5, 1795 – August 1, 1865) was an American politician who served as the 19th governor of Rhode Island.

Diman was born in Bristol, Rhode Island, on August 5, 1795. He worked in a counting-house for over two decades. He was then engaged in the whaling and mill businesses. He served in the Rhode Island Militia and later became Brigadier General. He became a member of the Rhode Island House of Representatives for many terms.

He became Lieutenant governor of Rhode Island for three years before winning election as the governor of Rhode Island. He was a Law and Order Party candidate. Although he did not win the majority of votes, he was selected as the governor of the state by the General Assembly. He held the governor's office from May 6, 1846, to May 4, 1847.

He later served in the Rhode Island State Senate for three years serving under Governors James Fenner and Charles Jackson. He was also active in organizing the Republican Party in Bristol. He died on August 1, 1865, and was buried in Juniper Hill Cemetery.

== Sources ==
- Sobel, Robert and John Raimo. Biographical Directory of the Governors of the United States, 1789-1978. Greenwood Press, 1988. ISBN 0-313-28093-2

Party political offices
Preceded by James Fenner	Law and Order nominee for Governor of Rhode Island; 1846	Succeeded by None
Political offices
Preceded by Joseph Childs	Lieutenant Governor of Rhode Island; 1840–1842	Succeeded by Nathanael Bullock
Preceded by Nathanael Bullock	Lieutenant Governor of Rhode Island; 1843–1846	Succeeded by Elisha Harris
Preceded by Charles Jackson	Governor of Rhode Island; 1846–1847	Succeeded by Elisha Harris
