= Law and Order Party of Rhode Island =

Political party in Rhode Island

Law and Order Party
- Leader: Samuel Ward King; James Fenner; Byron Diman
- Founded: 1842; 184 years ago
- Dissolved: 1847; 179 years ago
- Split from: Whig Party
- Merged into: Whig Party
- Headquarters: Old Colony House, Newport, Rhode Island
- Ideology: Anti-Dorr
- Colors: Teal

The Law and Order Party of Rhode Island was a short-lived political party in the state of Rhode Island in the 1840s, brought into existence as a consequence of the Dorr Rebellion.

== Background ==
In 1840, Rhode Island still used the King's Charter of 1663 as its constitution, which held that only landowners with $134 in property could vote. This effectively disenfranchised 60-percent of the state's freemen.

== History ==
In 1841 and 1842, Rhode Island Governor Samuel Ward King faced opposition from Thomas Wilson Dorr and his followers in the Rhode Island Suffrage Party who wanted to extend suffrage to a wider group of citizens. Governor King put together a Law and Order coalition of Whigs and conservative Democrats to put down the opposition. King and his coalition declared martial law on May 4, 1842. The state militia ended the rebellion by the end of the summer of 1842.

The Law and Order Party were initially opposed to extending suffrage, but they realized that the 1663 charter was archaic. After the rebellion, it became clear that they needed to compromise. In November 1842, they drafted a "Law And Order Constitution" which extended the right to vote to all native-born adult males, including black men. Effective May 1843, this new Constitution replaced the old King's Charter of 1663.

== Elected officeholders ==
- Governor James Fenner (1843–1845)
- Governor Byron Diman (1846–1847)
- United States Senator John B. Francis (1843–1845)
- United States Representative Henry Y. Cranston (1843–1847) – served as a Whig during his second term)
- United States Representative Elisha R. Potter (1843–1845)
