= Joseph Brown Ladd =

American doctor and poet

Joseph Brown Ladd was an American doctor and poet.

== Early life ==
Joseph Brown Ladd was born on July 7, 1764, in Little Compton, Rhode Island to parents William and Sarah (Gardner) Ladd on his parent's farm.

During his upbringing, Ladd didn't enjoy the farm work, and preferred education, mainly science and literature. While he was farming, he whistled often, developing a talent for it as a young boy. His father would regularly scold him for not working on the land, but had Ladd work in a mercantile environment, which the boy hated more. Soon after, he relocated to a printing job, before being fired due to a client asking to submit a satirical piece on a local doctor. He published his first poem, "An Address to the Almighty" at age ten, under the pen name Arouet. At age 15, he started studying under Dr. Isaac Senter, a writer and surgeon from Londonderry, New Hampshire.

Around this time, Ladd started to see an orphan heiress only identified as "Amanda". Ladd often wrote love letters to the girl, despite relatives not approving of him and threatening her.

== Move to Charleston ==
While still studying under Senter, Ladd became friends with Nathaniel Greene, a Revolutionary War General from Potowomut, Rhode Island. Greene told Ladd about the possibilities of moving down south for work, and at the age of 20 in 1783, he moved to the Thomas Rose House at 59 Church Street. Two sisters, Fannie and Dellie Rose, lived with Ladd. Amanda stayed in Rhode Island and married soon after. Ladd still wrote poems to her.

A local resident, Ralph Isaacs III, became close with Ladd and was one of Ladd's first friends in Charleston.

Ladd became well known in the area due to helping both poor and rich residents, and for his whistling. The Rose sister's noted of how much Ladd would whistle around the house.

== Duel and Death ==
Overtime, Isaacs became annoyed and jealous at Ladd's fast popularity. After some back and forth in the press, Isaacs asked for a duel against Ladd, who accepted. On October 23, 1786, the former friends dueled. Ladd purposefully missed, while Isaacs shot Ladd in the kneecap just to injure him. Spectators took the injured Ladd to his house, where he died 10 days later due to blood loss and gangrene.

== Ghost Story ==
Now currently apart of the National Register of Historic Places, The Thomas Rose House is well known for being haunted, most assume of the ghost of Ladd. Reportedly, whistling is heard often in the house, along with doors and windows being opened and closed.
