= Equestrian statue of Nathanael Greene =

Statue by Henry Kirke Brown in Washington, D.C, U.S.

- Major General Nathanael Greene
- U.S. National Register of Historic Places
- U.S. Historic district – Contributing property
- D.C. Inventory of Historic Sites
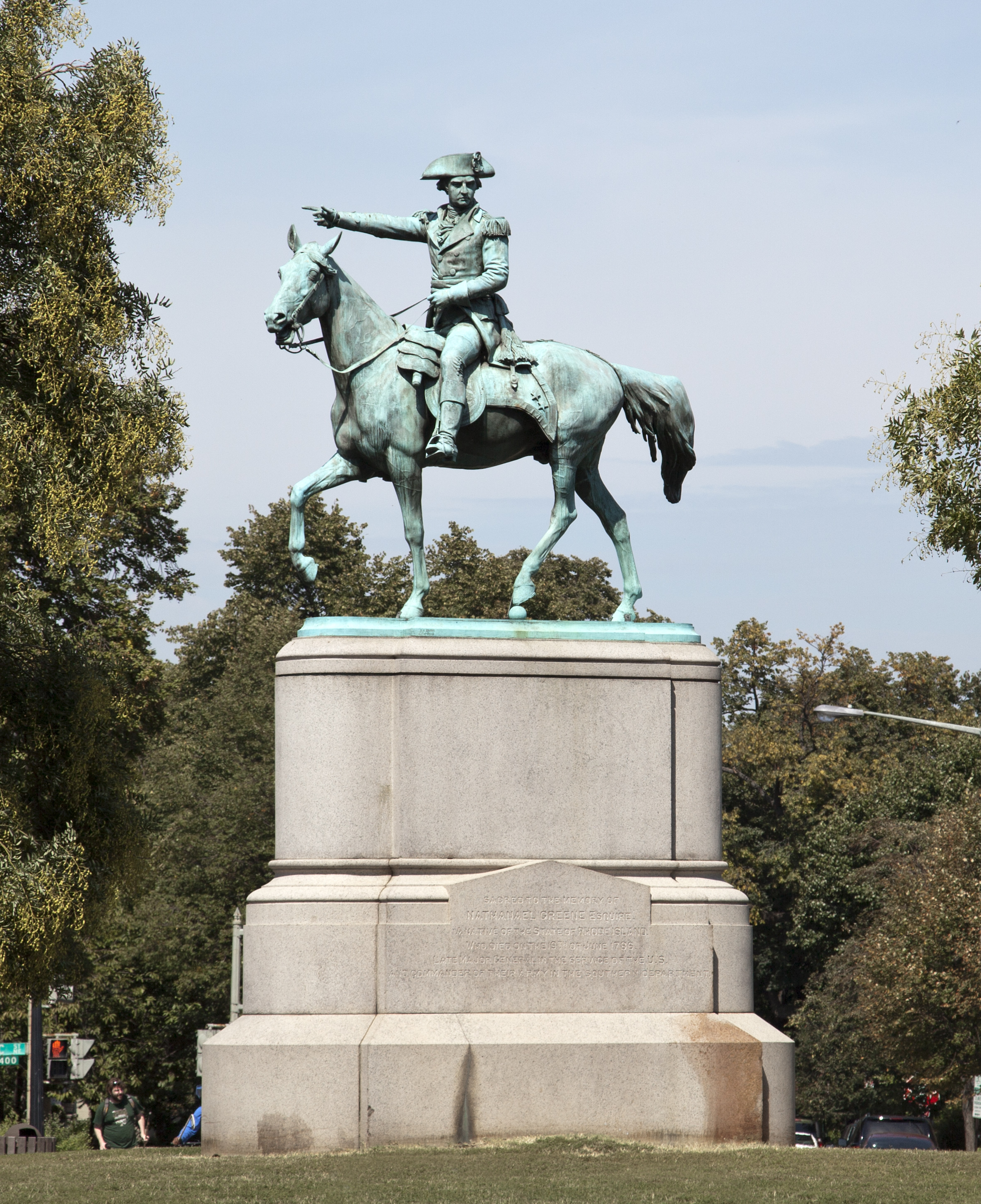
- The equestrian statue of Nathanael Greene photographed in 2010 by Carol M. Highsmith
- Location: Stanton Park, Washington, D.C.
- Coordinates: 38°53′36.96″N 76°59′58.2″W
- Built: 1878
- Architects: Henry Kirke Brown (sculptor); Robert Wood & Company (founder)
- Part of: • American Revolution Statuary (78000256) • Capitol Hill (76002127) • L'Enfant Plan (97000332)
- NRHP reference No.: 78000256

Significant dates
- Added to NRHP: • August 27, 1976 (Capitol Hill) • July 14, 1978 (American Revolution Statuary) • April 24, 1997 (L'Enfant Plan)
- Designated CP: • July 14, 1978 (American Revolution Statuary) • February 6, 1985 (Capitol Hill) • April 24, 1997 (L'Enfant Plan)
- Designated DCIHS: • January 19, 1971 (L'Enfant Plan) • June 19, 1973 (Capitol Hill Historic District) • March 3, 1979 (American Revolution Statuary)

Major General Nathanael Greene is a bronze equestrian statue honoring Nathanael Greene, a military leader during the American Revolutionary War. Greene was from modern-day Rhode Island and after laws passed by the Kingdom of Great Britain, along with the burning of one of his ships, Greene formed a state militia. He was later promoted to brigadier general in the Continental Army where he became a trusted adviser to Commander-in-Chief General George Washington. Greene played an active role during the war, participating in battles, sieges, and campaigns from New England to the Southern Colonies. For his service to the war, Greene was offered free land and settled in Georgia with his family. He died a few years later from a heatstroke.

Soon after the war concluded, the Congress of the Confederation passed a resolution to honor Greene with a memorial in the nation's capital. Nothing happened for almost 100 years until 1874 when Congress authorized $40,000 to be spent on an equestrian statue of Greene. A further $10,000 was allocated the following year for the pedestal. The sculptor chosen to create the statue, Henry Kirke Brown, had already made a statue of Greene that stands in the National Statuary Hall Collection. The pedestal was installed Christmas Eve 1877, and the statue was placed in position early the following year. The statue was well-received and is considered one of the best equestrian statues in Washington, D.C. It is located in the center of Stanton Park in the Capitol Hill neighborhood, a couple of blocks east of the U.S. Capitol.

A wind storm and corroded rivets resulted in the statue toppling over in 1930, but it was mostly unharmed. Greene's statue is one of 14 American Revolution Statuary in Washington, D.C., that were collectively listed on the National Register of Historic Places (NRHP) in 1978 and the District of Columbia Inventory of Historic Sites (DCIHS) the following year. In addition, the statue is a contributing property to the L'Enfant Plan and the Capitol Hill Historic District.

== History ==
=== Biography ===
Nathanael Greene was born on August 7, 1742, at Forge Farm in the Colony of Rhode Island and Providence Plantations, present-day Rhode Island. He was born into a Quaker upper-income family. Despite his family's religious beliefs against "book learning," Greene convinced his father to hire a tutor. The tutor, Ezra Stiles, would later become president of Yale College. Greene's father trained him to be a founder when his son wasn't learning classical education during the Age of Enlightenment. In 1770, Greene moved to his home in Coventry, Rhode Island, to run the family's foundry. That same year his father died, leaving the family business to Greene and his brothers. He married Catharine Littlefield Greene in 1774, with whom he had seven children.

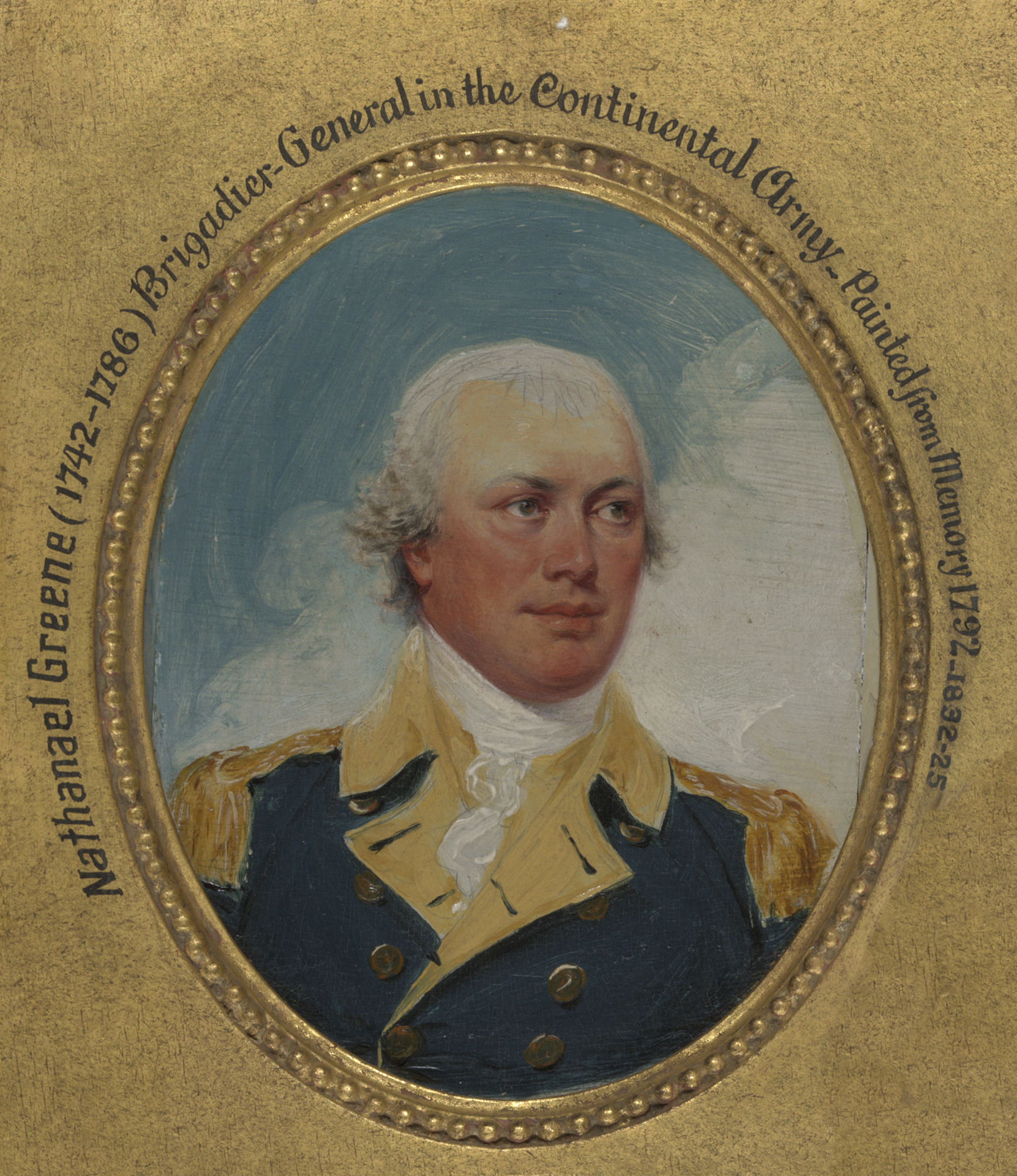
A portrait of Greene

The Kingdom of Great Britain imposed heavy fines and taxes on the Thirteen Colonies after the French and Indian War. On one occasion, a British officer seized a boat owned by the Greene family. Greene sued, and although he won the case, his boat was burnt during the 1772 Gaspee affair. He became disillusioned with not only his loyalty to the British, but also his religious faith. Greene was ultimately banned from Quaker meetings in 1773. After what the colonists nicknamed the Intolerable Acts, in 1774 Greene organized the Kentish Guards, consisting of Rhode Island militia. Due to a limp Greene had since childhood, he was not commissioned an officer in the Kentish Guards.

For the next year, Greene recruited men to fight against the British. His actions impressed colonial leaders and he was put in charge of three militias by the state Colonial Assembly. Before the American Revolutionary War began in 1775, Greene was commissioned a brigadier general in the Continental Army and became a trusted adviser to George Washington. During the war, Greene participated in numerous battles and campaigns. He assisted with the Siege of Boston, the New York and New Jersey campaign, commandeering Fort Constitution, the Battle of Trenton, the Battle of Germantown, and served as quartermaster general at Valley Forge during the winter of 1777-1778. Greene was sent to the southern colonies to assist with the southern campaign. Some of the battles where he participated include the Battle of Guilford Court House, the Battle of Hobkirk's Hill, and the Battle of Eutaw Springs.

After the war concluded, many people considered Greene to have been the second-best general in the Continental Army, with the first being Washington. Some of the southern states offered Greene land confiscated from loyalists. He settled in Georgia at the Mulberry Grove Plantation, but died three years later on June 19, 1786, from a heat stroke. His ashes were interned under the Nathanael Greene Monument in Savannah, Georgia.

=== Memorial plans and dedication ===
Soon after the Revolutionary War ended, the Congress of the Confederation passed a resolution to erect a memorial in the nation's capital honoring Greene. For unknown reasons, this did not occur until almost 100 years later. The area that now surrounds Stanton Park was named after Abraham Lincoln's Secretary of War, Edwin Stanton, sometime in the early 1870s. The area was mostly undeveloped after the Civil War. In order to spur growth around the square and to honor a national hero, Congress authorized the erection of an equestrian statue of Greene on June 23, 1874. One member from the Senate and one from the House of Representatives were to join Green's grandson, George Washington Greene, on a commission to complete the statue's installation at a cost of $40,000. Congress authorized an additional $10,000 for the pedestal on March 3, 1875.

The sculptor chosen to create the statue was Henry Kirke Brown, whose other works include the equestrian statue of Winfield Scott in Washington, D.C., the equestrian statue of George Washington in New York City, and the Washington Monument at West Point, New York. In addition to these outdoor statues, Brown sculpted the statue of Nathanael Greene and others for the National Statuary Hall Collection. Brown was unhappy with the amount he earned for Greene's equestrian statue.

Congress authorized the placement of the statue in 1877. On Christmas Eve 1877, the pedestal, made by the Quincy Granite Company, was installed. Brown returned to Washington, D.C., after the holidays to supervise the statue being placed on the pedestal. The statue, which was founded by Robert Wood & Company, was praised by critics, who noted the fine details of the horse and Greene. It is considered one of the best equestrian statues in Washington, D.C. The surrounding park was improved over the next couple of years, with fencing, sidewalks, and trees added.

=== Later history ===
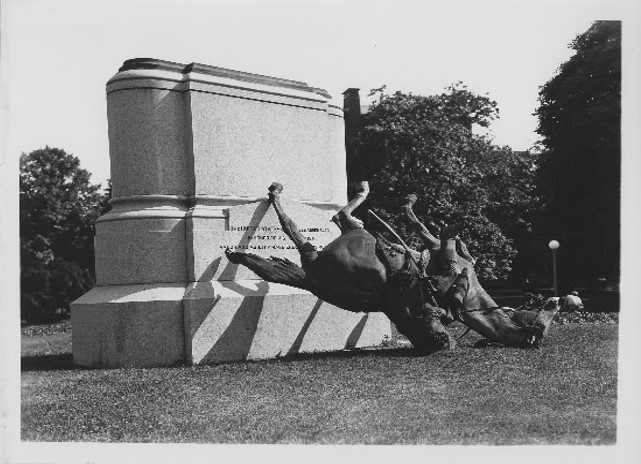
The statue in 1930 after corroded rivets and high winds resulted in it falling off the pedestal

In June 1930, what newspapers called a "freakish gust of wind," blew through Stanton Park, toppling the statue. The statue's head and shoulders were buried into the ground, but remarkably the statue was unharmed, except for a small crack on the horse's left thigh. It was found the rivets were corroded, making the statue easily susceptible to falling. The statue was lifted back in place by using a derrick.

The Greene statue is one of 14 American Revolution Statuary that were collectively listed on the National Register of Historic Places (NRHP) on July 14, 1978. The statuary was added to the District of Columbia Inventory of Historic Sites (DCIHS) the following year on March 3, 1979. Because of its location on a square planned by Pierre Charles L'Enfant, the statue is a contributing property to the L'Enfant Plan, listed on the NRHP and DCIHS on April 24, 1997, and January 19, 1971, respectively. In addition, the statue is a contributing property to the Capitol Hill Historic District, which was added to the DCIHS on June 19, 1973, followed by the NRHP a few years later on August 27, 1976. The statue and surrounding park are owned and maintained by the National Park Service.

== Location and design ==
=== Location ===
Greene's statue is sited in the center of Stanton Park (Reservation 15), also known as Stanton Square, in the Capitol Hill neighborhood of Washington, D.C. Stanton Park is bounded by 4th Street, 5th Street, 6th Street, and C Street SE, and is also where Maryland Avenue and Massachusetts Avenue SE intersect. The park is around 0.5 miles (0.8 km) northeast of the United States Capitol. It is the only public space in Washington, D.C., that is not named after the memorial which is located there.

=== Design ===
The bronze statue of Greene is 11-feet (3.4 m) tall and 15-feet (4.6 m) long. It rests on a granite oval base measuring 14-feet (4.3 m) tall, 17-feet (5.2 m) long, and 8-feet (2.4 m) wide. Greene is riding a horse that has its right leg up while trotting. Greene is wearing his Colonial Army uniform and a three-cornered hat. He is depicted leading his soldiers into battle while holding the horse's reins with his left hand. Greene's right arm is pointing ahead, reminiscent of a military officer pointing the enemy to his troops.

The inscription on the base reads:

SCULP H. K. BROWN

R. WOOD AND CO.

(Base, south side:)

SACRED TO THE MEMORY OF NATHANAEL GREENE, ESQUIRE

A NATIVE OF THE STATE OF RHODE ISLAND

WHO DIED ON THE 19TH OF JUNE 1786

LATE MAJOR GENERAL IN THE SERVICE OF THE U.S.

AND COMMANDER OF THEIR ARMY IN THE SOUTHERN DEPARTMENT

(Base, north side:)

THE UNITED STATES CONGRESS ASSEMBLED

IN HONOR OF HIS PATRIOTISM,

VALOR, AND ABILITY HAVE ERECTED THIS MONUMENT

== See also ==
- List of public art in Washington, D.C., Ward 6
- National Register of Historic Places in Washington, D.C.
- Outdoor sculpture in Washington, D.C.
