= Henry Kirke Brown =

American sculptor (1814–1886)

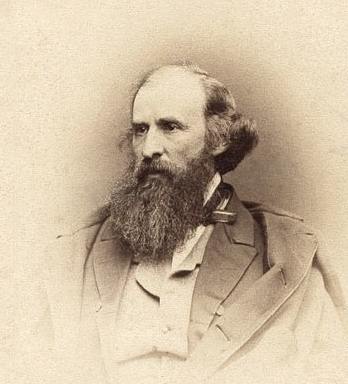
- Henry Kirke Brown, circa 1870
- Born: February 24, 1814; Leyden, Massachusetts, U.S.
- Died: July 10, 1886 (aged 72); Newburgh, New York, U.S.
- Known for: Sculpture

Henry Kirke Brown (February 24, 1814 in Leyden, Massachusetts – July 10, 1886 in Newburgh, New York) was an American sculptor.

== Life ==
He began to paint portraits while still a boy, studied painting in Boston under Chester Harding, learned a little about modelling, and in 1836-1839 spent his summers working as a railroad engineer to earn enough to enable him to study further.

He spent four years (1842–1846) in Italy; but returning to New York he wanted to ensure he remained distinctively American. He bemoaned the fact that so many of the early American sculptors were dominated by Italian influence. Even so, his work combines American subject matter with the style of the Italian masters, such as Donatello.

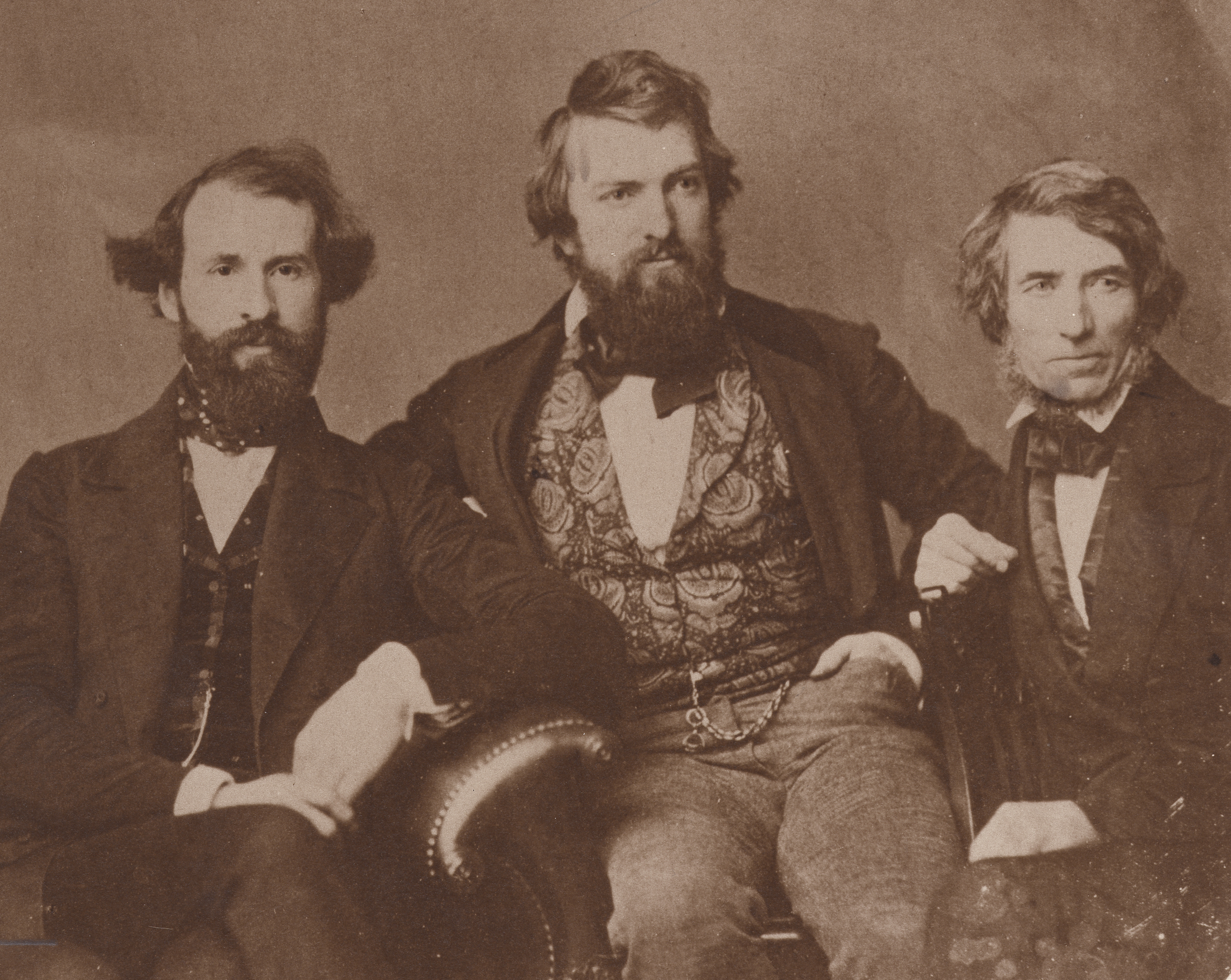
L to R.: Henry Kirke Brown, Henry Peters Gray and Asher Brown Durand, 1850

He produced the small, bronze statuette The Choosing of the Arrow for distribution by the American Art Union, in 1849. His equestrian statues are excellent, notably that of George Washington (1856) in Union Square, New York City, which was the second equestrian statue made in the United States, following by three years that of Andrew Jackson in Washington, D.C. by Clark Mills (1815–1883), and of Brevet Lt. General Winfield Scott (1874) in Washington, D.C.. Brown was one of the first in America to cast his own bronzes. In 1847, Brown was elected into the National Academy of Design as an Associate member, and became a full member in 1851.

Among his other works are: statue of Abraham Lincoln (Union Square, New York City); Nathanael Greene, George Clinton, Philip Kearny, and Richard Stockton (all in the National Statuary Hall, United States Capitol, Washington, D.C.); De Witt Clinton (illustration, below) and The Angel of the Resurrection, both in Green-Wood Cemetery, Brooklyn, New York; and an Aboriginal Hunter.

The New York Times remarked that the DeWitt Clinton was the first American full-length sculpture cast in a single piece, when it was exhibited temporarily in City Hall Park in 1855.

== Family ==
His nephew and adopted son, Henry Kirke Bush-Brown, was also a sculptor and pupil of Brown's.

== Gallery ==
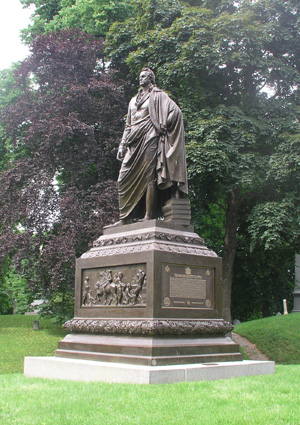
DeWitt Clinton Memorial, 1855, at Green-Wood Cemetery, Brooklyn

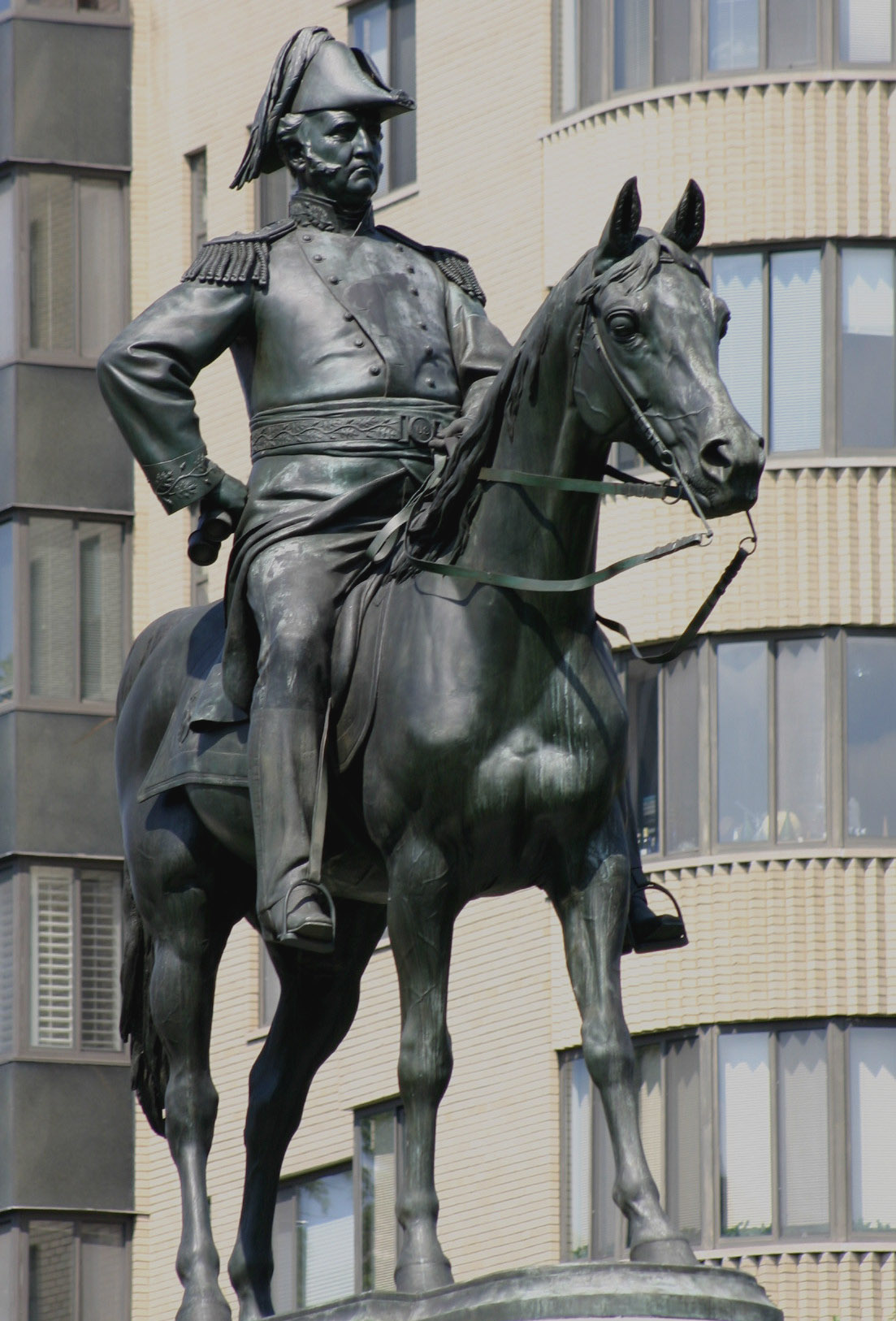
Brevet Lt. General Winfield Scott Scott Circle

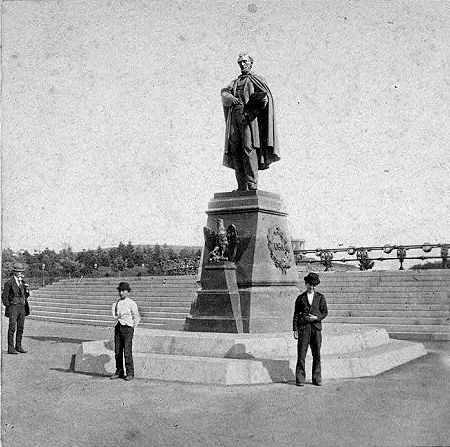
Abraham Lincoln at Grand Army Plaza, Prospect Park, Brooklyn

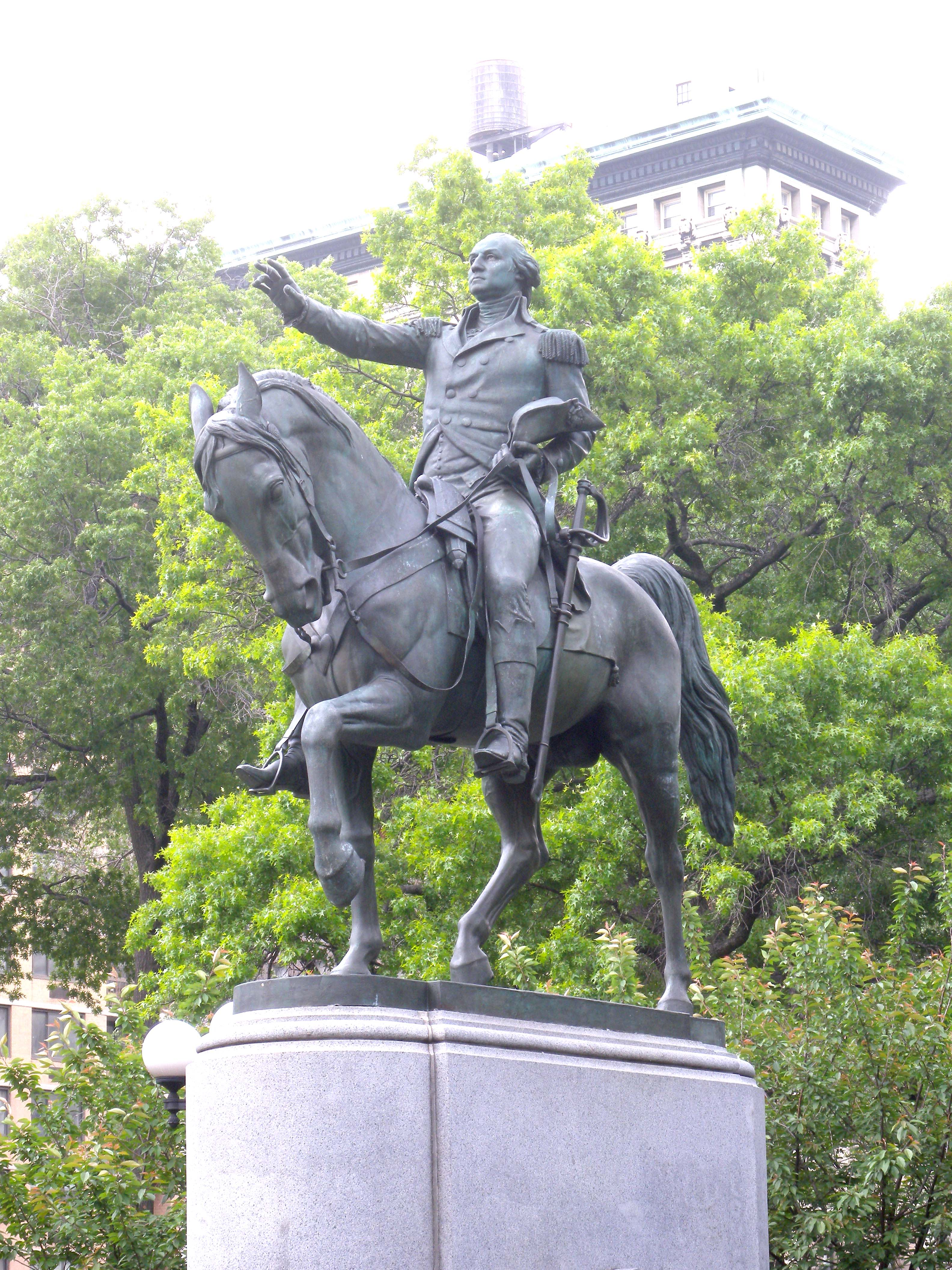
George Washington, at Union Square

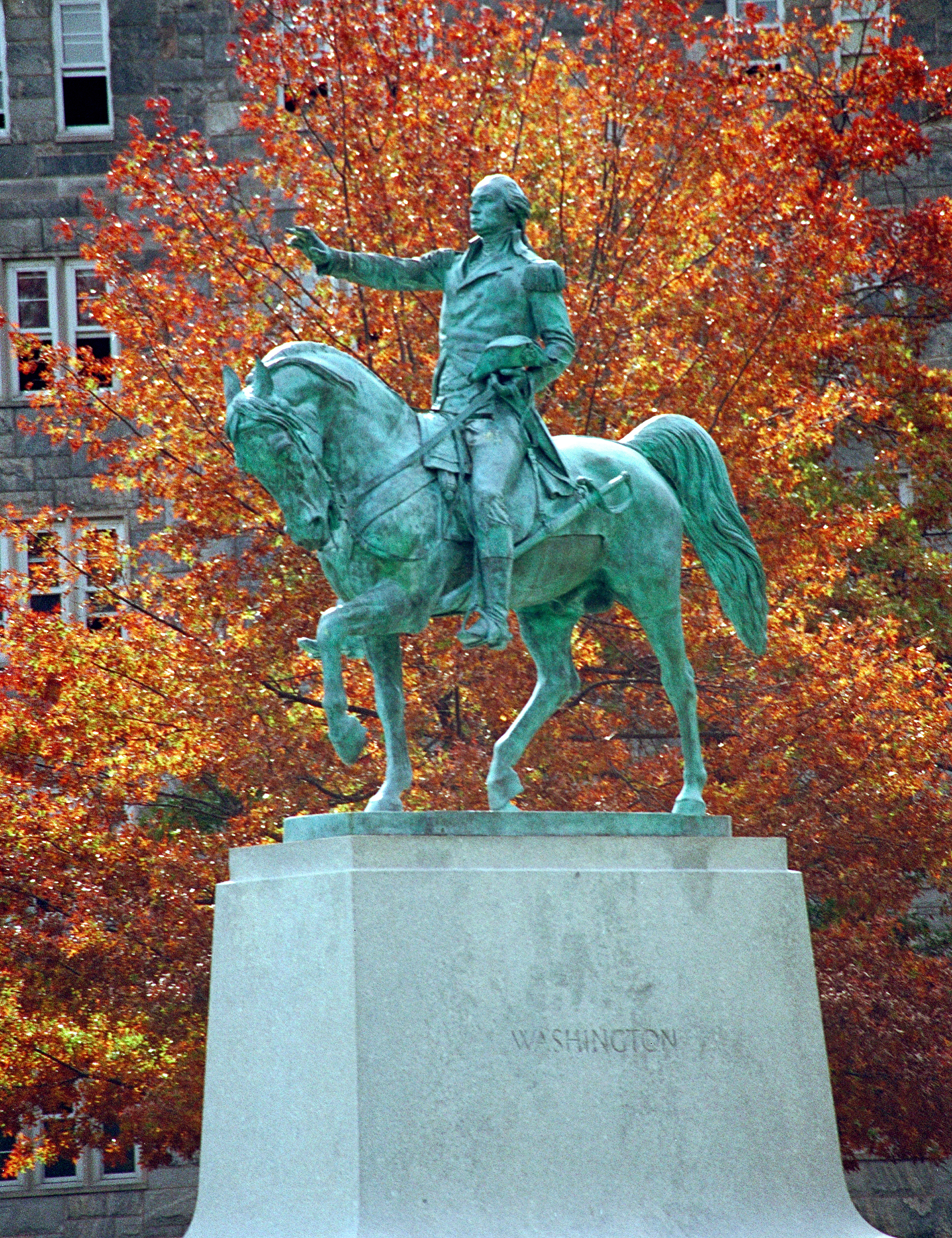
Washington Monument at West Point

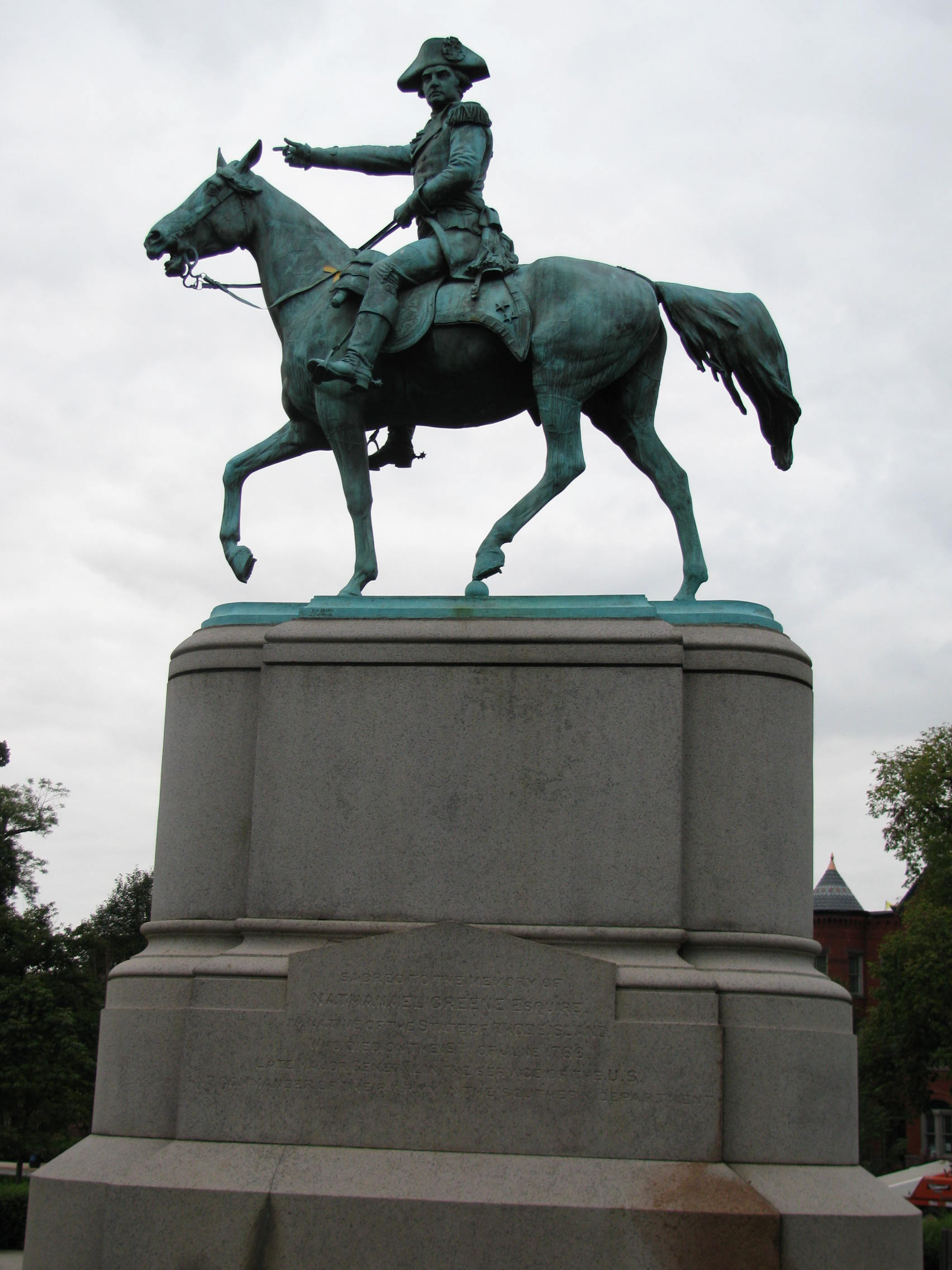
Major General Nathanael Greene, at Stanton Park

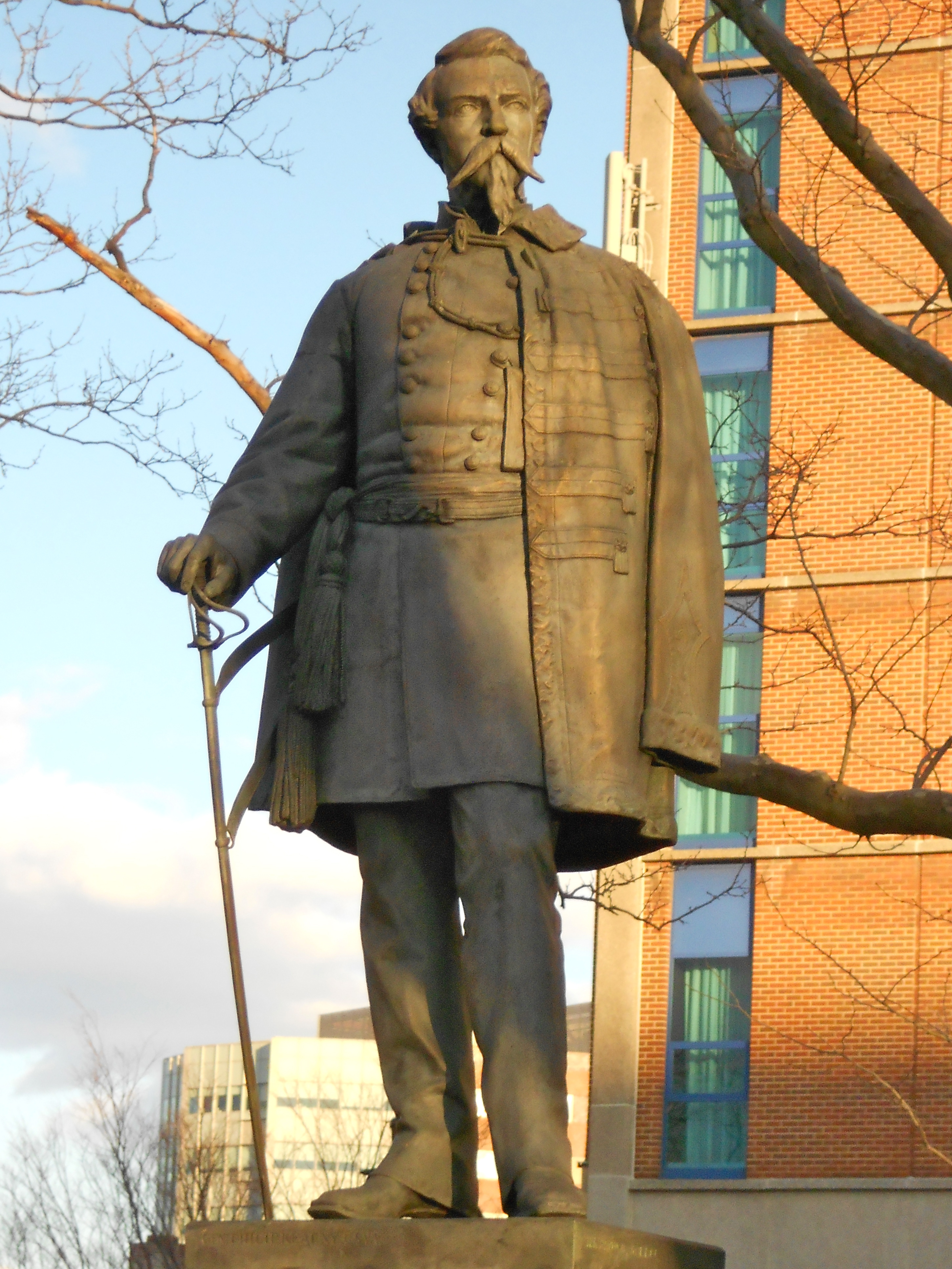
General Philip Kearny in Newark, New Jersey

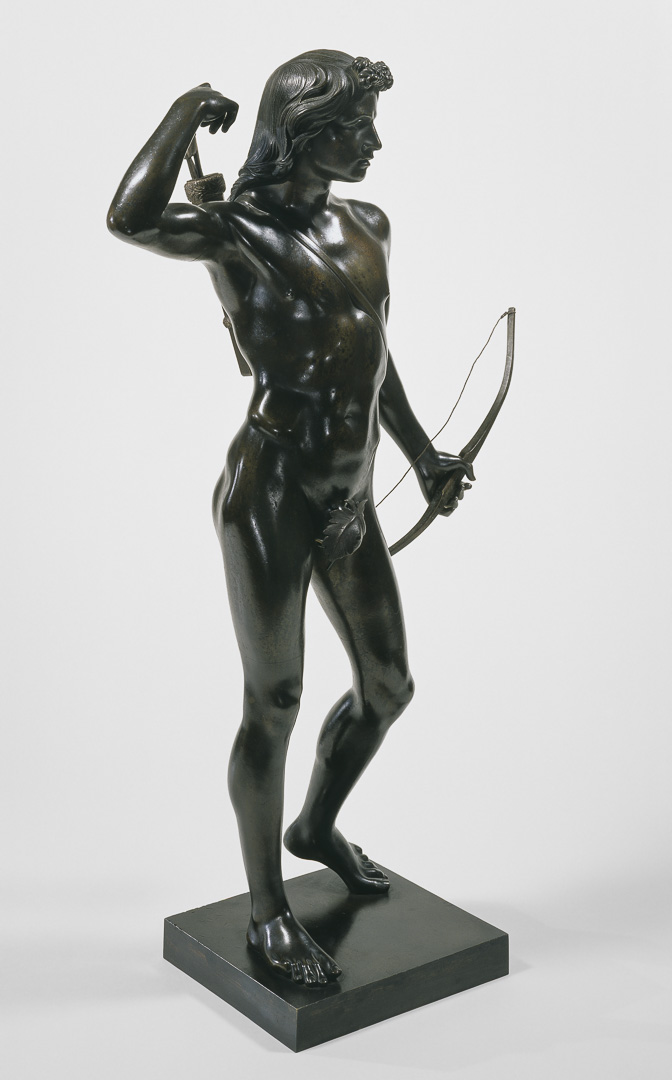
The Choosing of the Arrow, 1848, Bronze, Amon Carter Museum of American Art

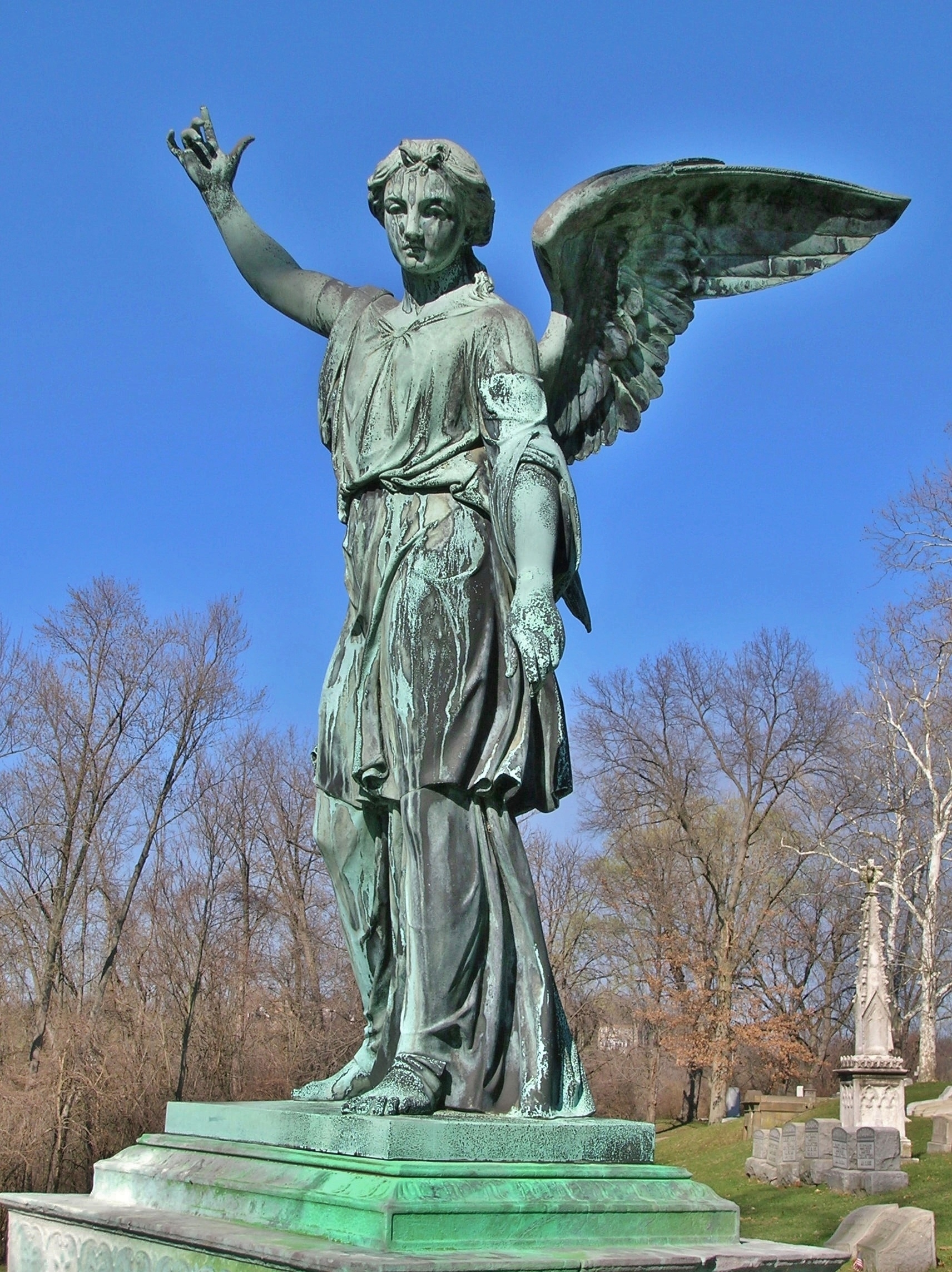
Angel of the Resurrection on James B. Hogg monument, ca. 1850, Allegheny Cemetery, Pittsburgh, Pennsylvania

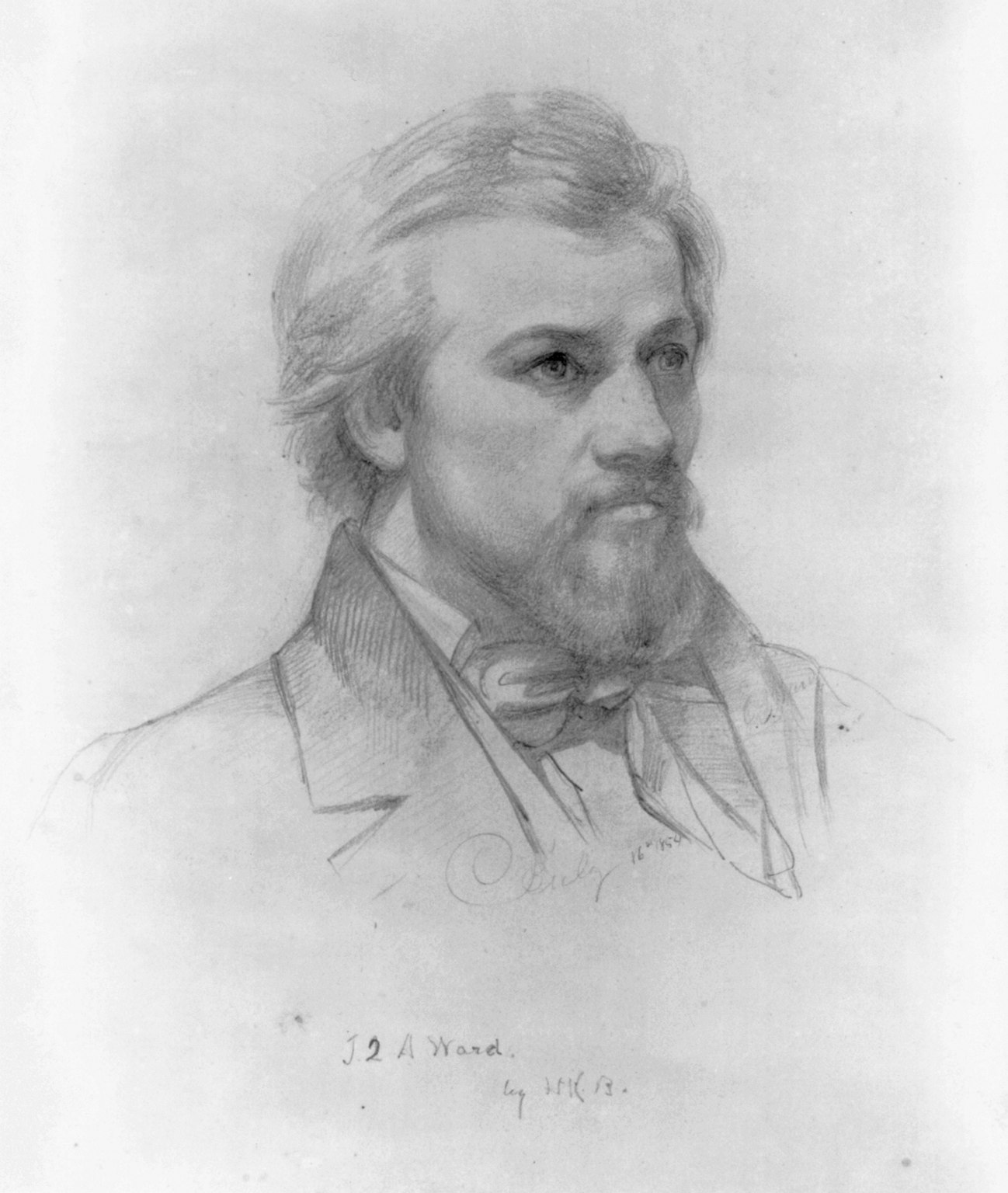
John Quincy Adams Ward

== Additional information ==
- Henry Kirke Brown Papers, 1814-1886, Sophia Smith Collection, Smith College.
