= Nathan Greene =

Nathan Greene may refer to:

- Nathan Greene (lawyer) (c. 1902–1964), American lawyer
- Nathan S. Greene (1810–1900), American businessman and politician

== See also ==
- Nathan Green (disambiguation)
- Nathaniel Greene (disambiguation)
