= Nathaniel Greene =

Nathaniel or Nathanael Greene may refer to:

- Nathanael Greene (1748–1786), American Revolutionary War general
  - SS Nathanael Greene, a Liberty ship
- Nathaniel Greene (journalist) (1797–1877), American journalist
- Nathaniel Greene Foster (1809–1869), American politician, lawyer, and military officer
- Major General Nathanael Greene (Brown), a bronze statue of Nathanael Greene by Henry Kirke Brown
- Nathanael Greene (Brown), a marble statue of Nathanael Greene by Henry Kirke Brown

== See also ==
- Nathaniel Everett Green (1823–1899), English painter and astronomer
- Nathan Greene (lawyer) (c. 1902–1964), American lawyer
- Nathan Green (disambiguation)
