= Forge Road Historic District =

Historic district in Rhode Island, United States

- U.S. National Register of Historic Places
- U.S. Historic district
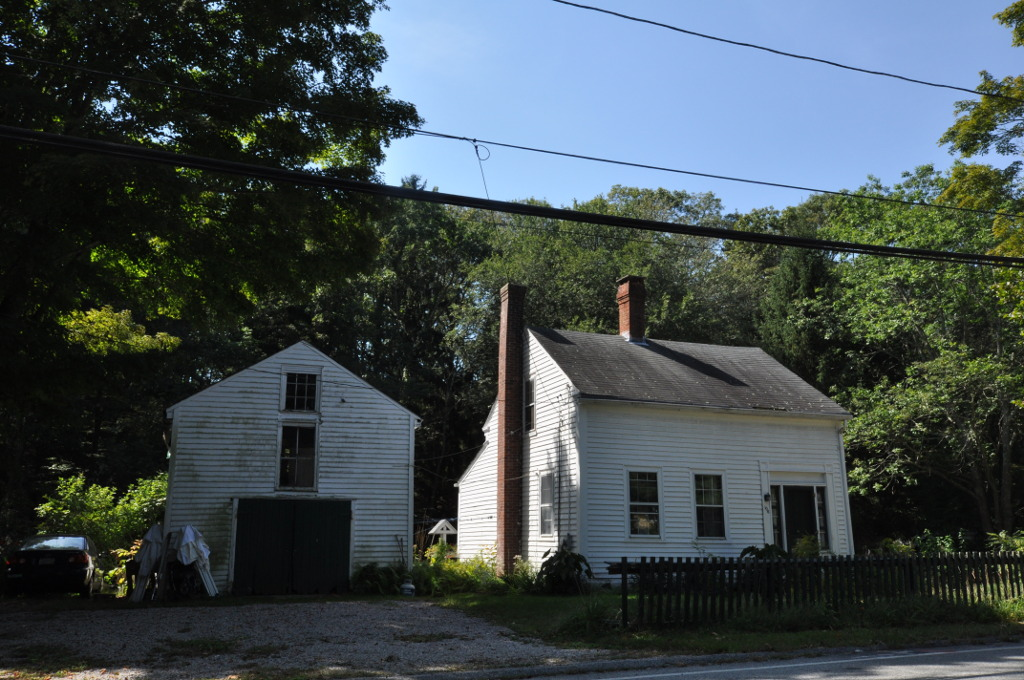

- Location within Rhode Island Location within the United States
- Location: Warwick, Rhode Island
- Coordinates: 41°38′18″N 71°27′4″W
- Area: 193 acres (78 ha)
- MPS: Warwick MRA
- NRHP reference No.: 84001861
- Added to NRHP: February 23, 1984

The Forge Road Historic District is a historic district on Forge Road from Ives Road to the Potowomut River in Warwick, Rhode Island. Most of the district's nearly 200 acres (81 ha) are taken up by the Forge Farm, which lies south of Forge Road, is one of the oldest farms in Rhode Island (dating to the mid-17th century), and was the birthplace of American Revolutionary War general Nathanael Greene. A memorial to Greene stands near the bridge crossing the Potowomut River. Opposite the farm on Forge Road stand four houses, all of which date to the late 18th to mid-19th century.

The district was added to the National Register of Historic Places in 1984.

== See also ==
- National Register of Historic Places listings in Kent County, Rhode Island
