= Nathan Green =

Nathan Green may refer to:

- Nathan "Nearest" Green (1820–?), emancipated slave and whiskey distiller
- Nathan Green Sr. (1792–1866), justice of the Tennessee Supreme Court
- Nathan Green Jr. (1827–1919), American educator and lawyer
- Nathan Green (golfer) (born 1970), Australian golfer
- Nathan Green (rugby league) (born 1992), Australian centre
- Nathan Green (footballer) (born 1992), English footballer
- Nathan Green (runner) (born 2003), American middle-distance runner

== See also ==
- Nathan Greene (disambiguation)
- Nathaniel Everett Green (1823–1899), English painter
- Nate Green (born 1977), English footballer
- Nate Green (author) (born 1985), author, writer, marketing strategist and fitness expert
- Nathaniel Greene (disambiguation)
- Nathan and Clarissa Green House, American historic home
- Nathan Green Gordon (1916–2008), American lawyer and World War II soldier
