= Forge Farm =

- U.S. National Register of Historic Places
- U.S. Historic district – Contributing property
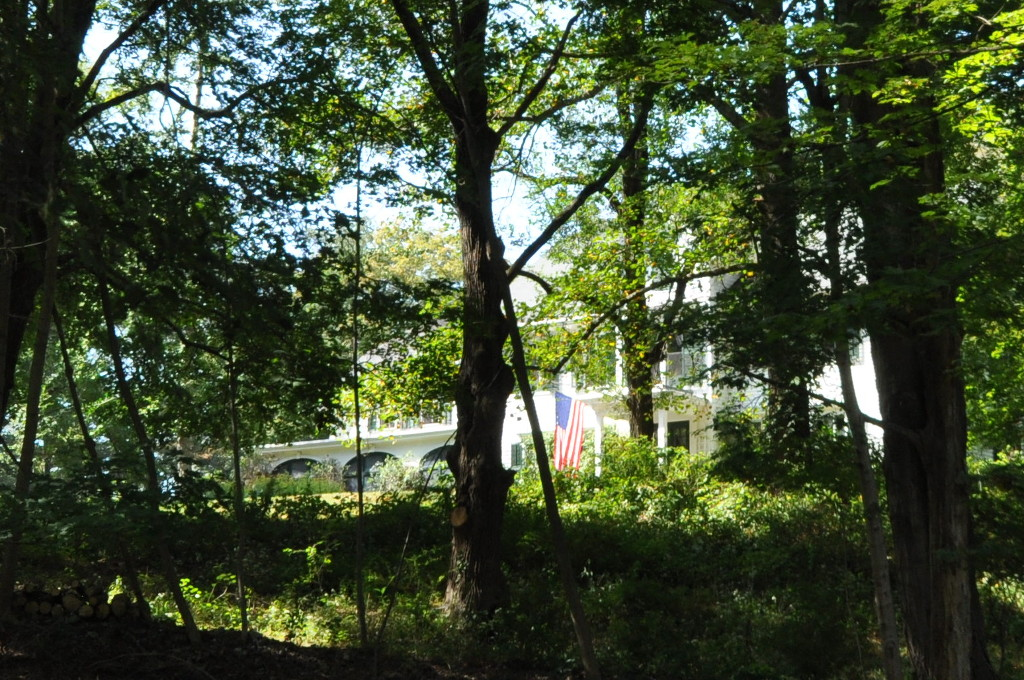

- Location within Rhode Island Location within the United States
- Location: 40 Forge Road, Warwick, Rhode Island
- Coordinates: 41°38′19″N 71°27′6″W
- Area: 179 acres (72 ha)
- Built: 1684
- Architectural style: Mid 19th Century Revival, Late Victorian
- Part of: Forge Road Historic District (ID84001861)
- NRHP reference No.: 74000037

Significant dates
- Added to NRHP: January 11, 1974
- Designated CP: February 23, 1984

Forge Farm is an historic farm in Warwick, Rhode Island. Established in the mid-17th century by the Greene family, it is one of the oldest farms in Rhode Island. It was the birthplace of General Nathanael Greene, a prominent American general in the American Revolutionary War. The core of the main house was built in 1684 by James Greene, son of John Greene, who purchased the land from local Native Americans. It has been extended and altered numerous times in the 18th and 19th centuries. Nathanael Greene was born in this house in 1742, and the farm was owned for many years by Nathanael's brother Christopher, and wife, Deborah (Ward) Greene, daughter of Continental Congress member Samuel Ward.

The farm was listed on the National Register of Historic Places in 1974.

== See also ==
- General Nathanael Greene Homestead, a National Historic Landmark
- National Register of Historic Places listings in Kent County, Rhode Island
