= Statue of George Clinton =

Sculpture by Henry Kirke Brown

George Clinton
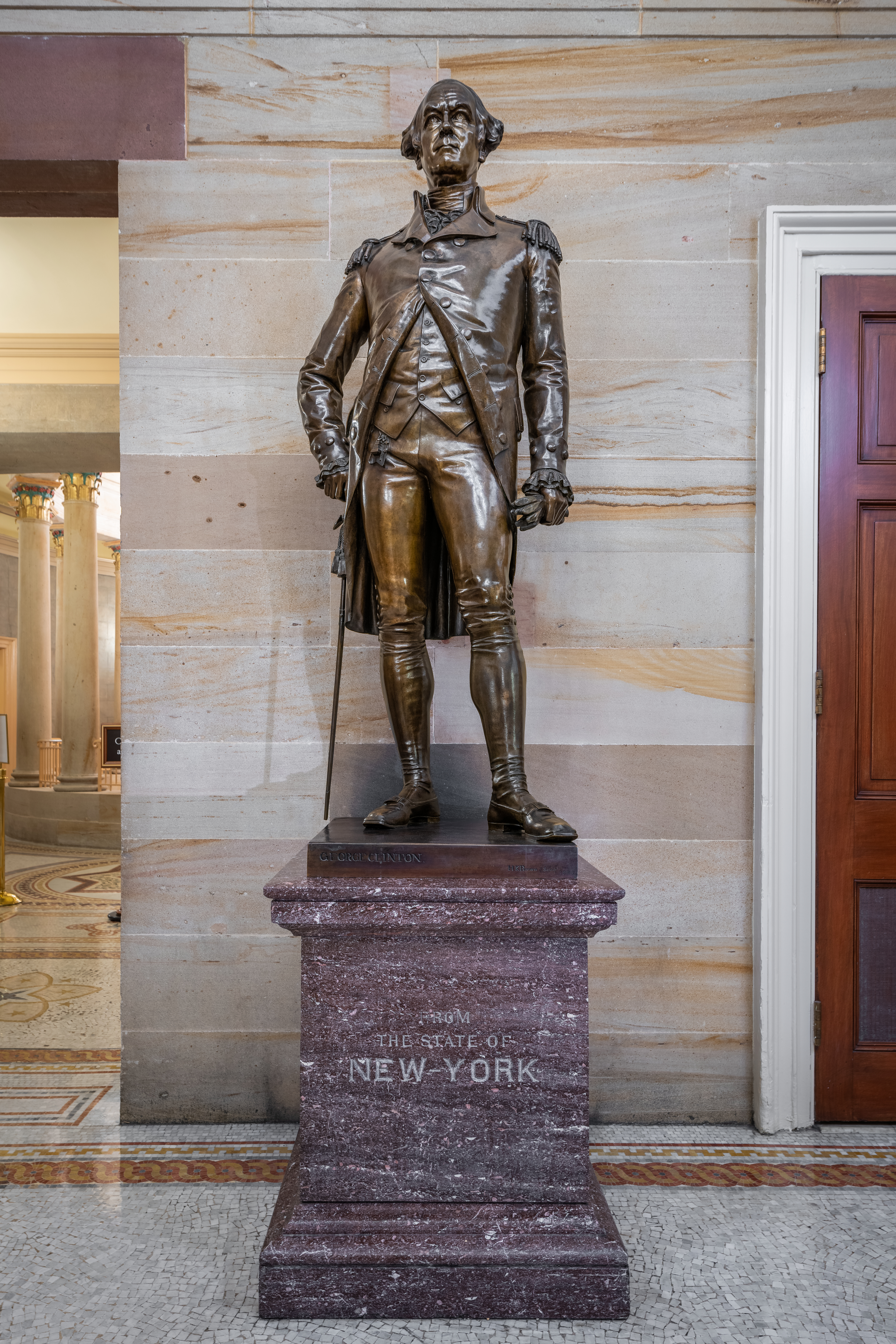
- The sculpture in the U.S. Capitol in 2023
- Artist: Henry Kirke Brown
- Medium: Bronze sculpture
- Subject: George Clinton
- Location: Washington, D.C., United States

George Clinton is an 1873 bronze sculpture depicting the American soldier and statesman of the same name by Henry Kirke Brown, installed in the United States Capitol, in Washington D.C., as part of the National Statuary Hall Collection. It is one of two statues donated by the U.S. state of New York. The statue is one of three by Brown in the Collection.

== See also ==
- 1873 in art
