= Stanton Park =

Park in Washington, D.C., U.S.

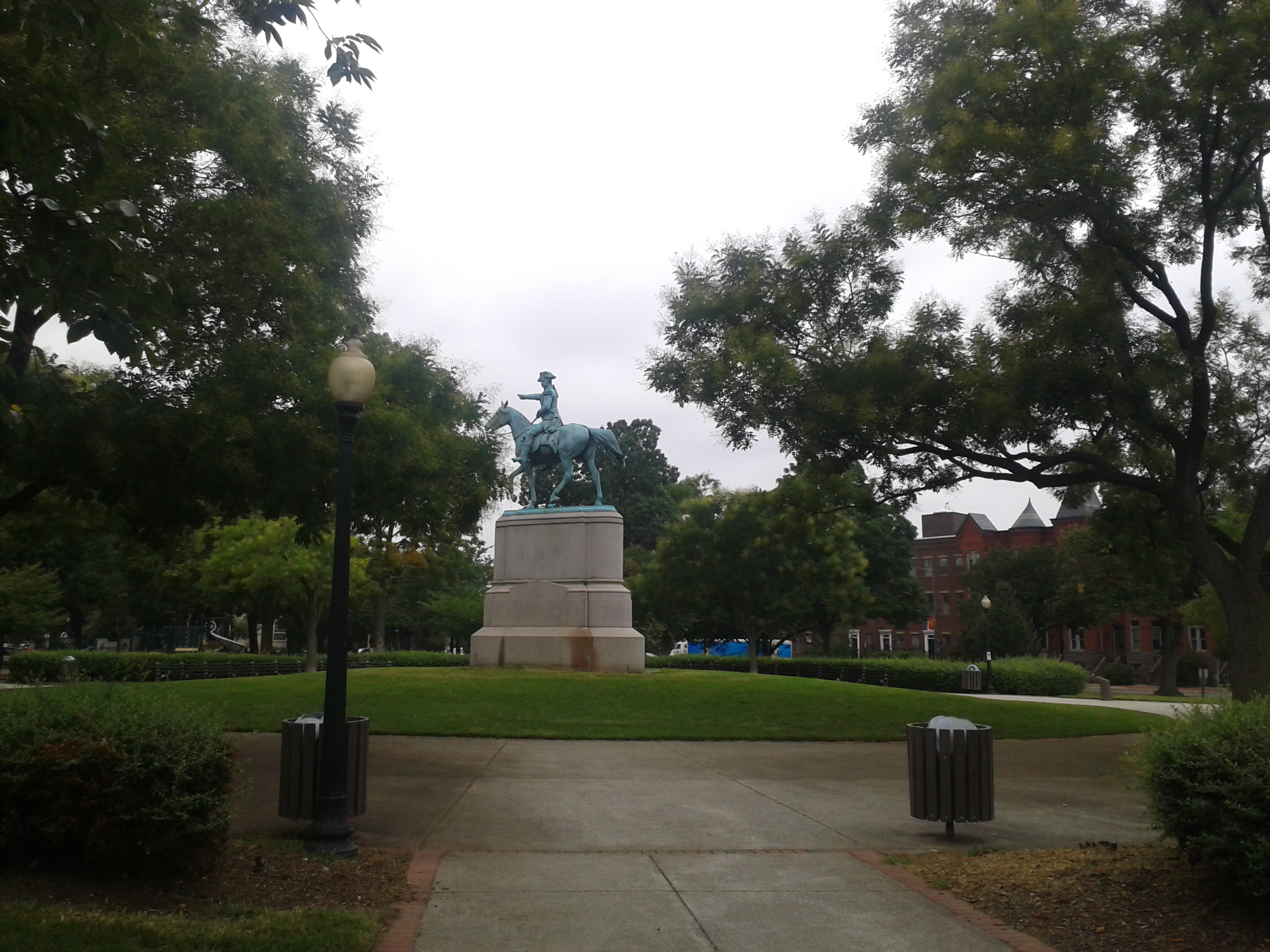
- Stanton Park in August, 2014, with the statue of Nathanael Greene

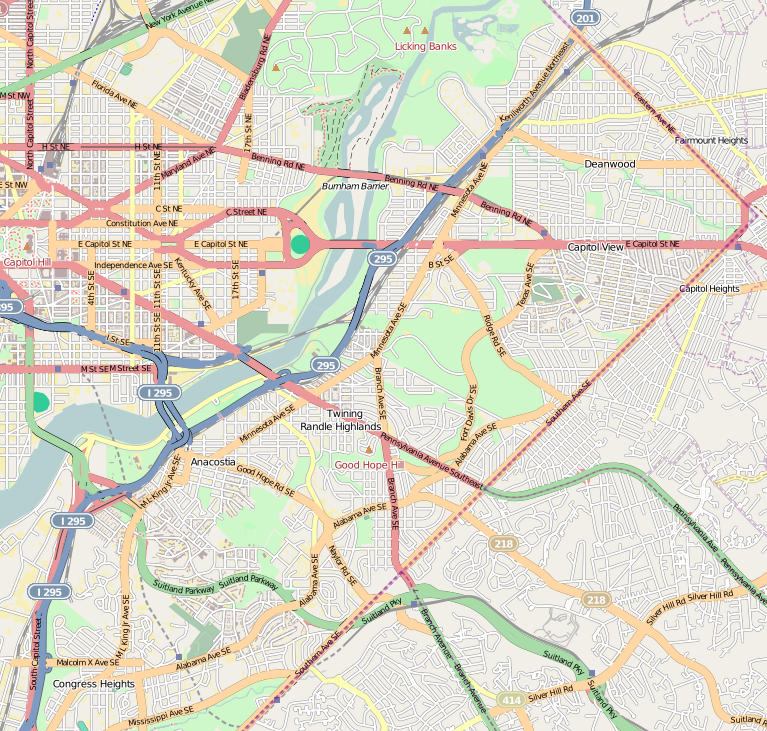
- Location within Washington, D.C.
- Location: Washington, D.C.
- Coordinates: 38°53′37″N 76°59′56″W
- Website: www.nps.gov/cahi/historyculture/cahi_stanton.htm

Stanton Park, formerly known as Stanton Square, is a national park in Washington, D.C., United States. It is located at the intersection of Maryland Avenue and Massachusetts Avenue in the Capitol Hill neighborhood of Northeast, Washington, D.C. It is bounded by 4th Street to the west and 6th Street to the east. North and south of the park are the respective westbound and eastbound lanes of C Street, NE.

The park is named after Edwin M. Stanton, the United States Secretary of War during the American Civil War, whose attempted later removal prompted the impeachment of President Andrew Johnson. Located in the center of Stanton Park is a statue of American Revolutionary War Major General Nathanael Greene. The park was included in Pierre L'Enfant's original plan for the city.

A playground is located in the western section of the park; a section in the eastern half is often used by dog walkers. The park is maintained by the National Park Service and as such, dogs are not allowed off-leash.

"Stanton Park" is also commonly used to describe the surrounding neighborhood. There are no official boundaries, but the Stanton Park Neighborhood Association represented the area from 2nd Street, NE to 10th Street, NE, and from East Capitol Street to H Street, NE.

== See also ==
- List of circles in Washington, D.C.
- Pershing Park
- Sonny Bono Park
- Stead Park
