= Thomas Rose House =

Historic house in South Carolina, United States

- U.S. National Register of Historic Places
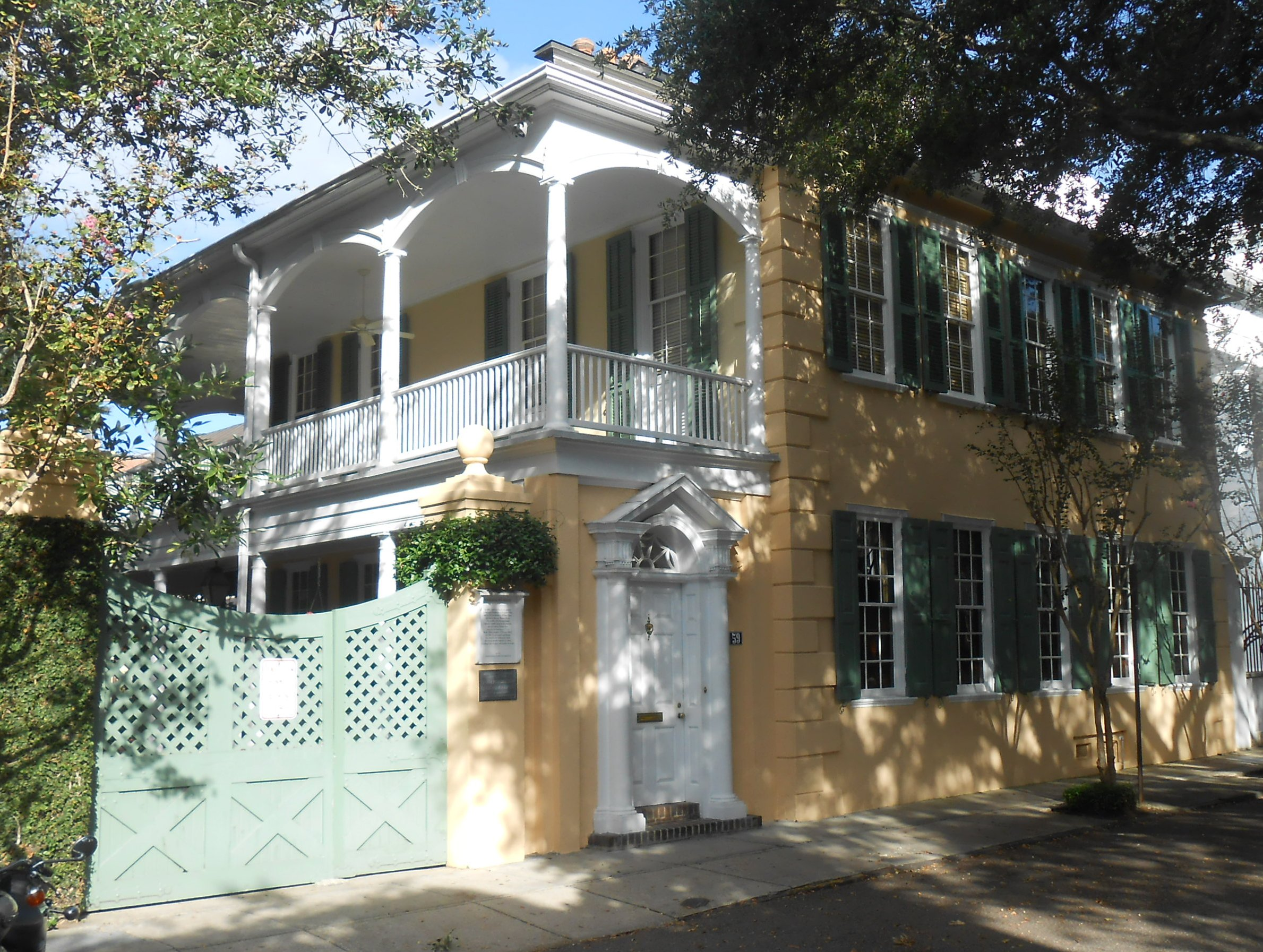

- Location within South Carolina Location within the United States
- Location: 57–59 Church St. Charleston, South Carolina
- Coordinates: 32°46′24″N 79°55′46″W
- Area: 0.3 acres (0.12 ha)
- Built: 1733
- Architectural style: Georgian
- NRHP reference No.: 70000892
- Added to NRHP: October 15, 1970

The Thomas Rose House is a National Register property located at 59 Church St. in Charleston, South Carolina. The 2 1/2-story stuccoed brick house was probably built by planter Thomas Rose in 1733. Thomas Rose House was built on a lot granted through the King's Lords Proprietor to Elizabeth Willis in 1680 — "one of the few grants given to a woman." Thomas Rose constructed the house on the original Charles Town Lot no. 61, inherited by his wife, Beuler Elliott, replacing an earlier dwelling. The house has excellent examples of original Georgian woodwork in the paneling, staircase, and elsewhere. In the twentieth century an owner razed a neighboring house on the adjoining lot to the south to accommodate a large garden.

As of 2025, it remains privately owned.
