= Statue of Nathanael Greene (U.S. Capitol) =

Sculpture by Henry Kirke Brown

Nathanael Greene
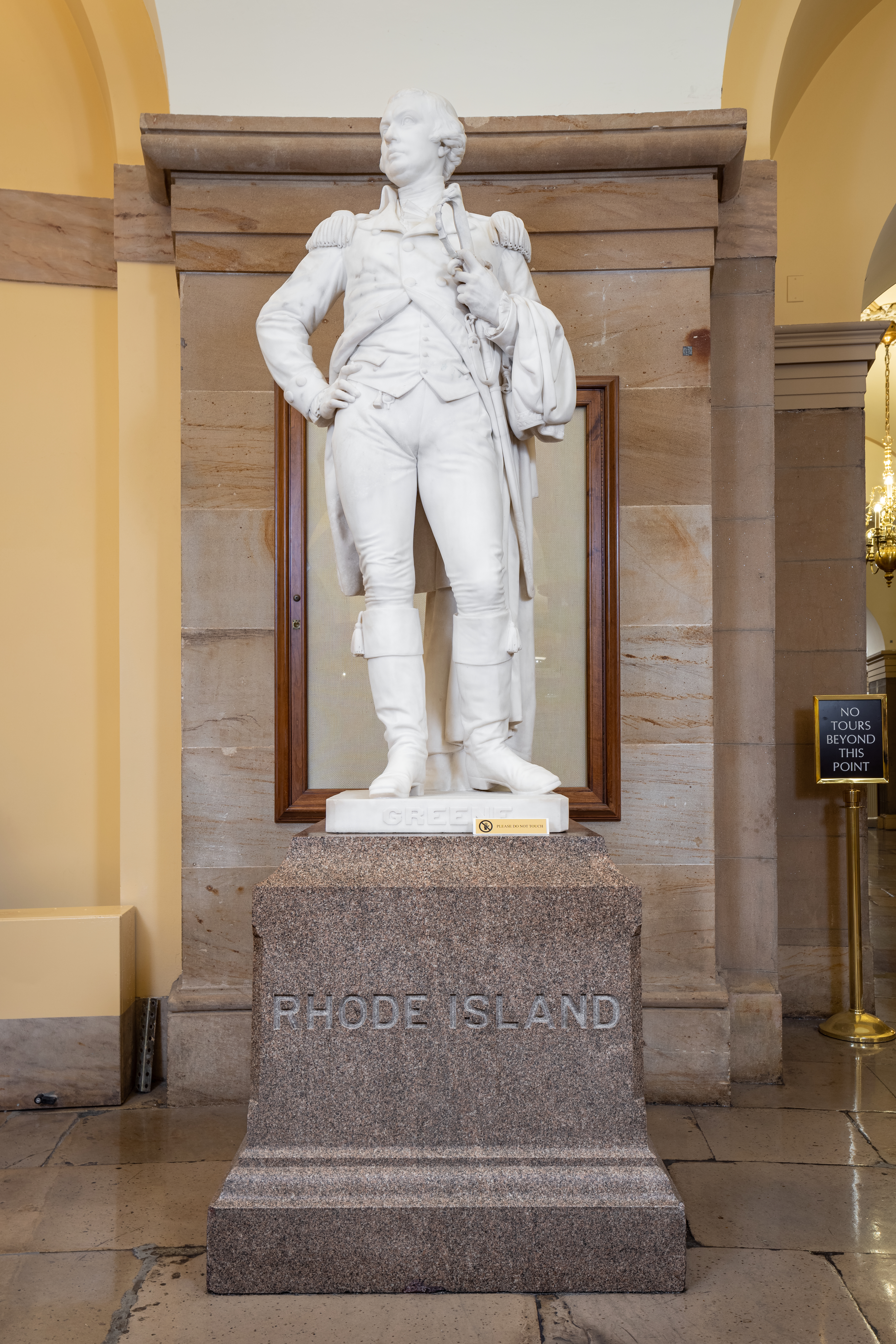
- The statue in the United States Capitol crypt in 2022
- Artist: Henry Kirke Brown
- Medium: Marble sculpture
- Subject: Nathanael Greene
- Location: Washington, D.C., U.S.

Nathaniel Greene is an 1870 marble statue of Nathanael Greene by Henry Kirke Brown, installed in the United States Capitol, in Washington, D.C., as part of the National Statuary Hall Collection. It is one of two statues donated by the state of Rhode Island. The statue portrays Greene dressed in the uniform of a Revolutionary War general, holding a sword in his left hand.

Brown later (1877) created an equestrian statue of Greene, also located in Washington, D.C.

== See also ==
- 1870 in art
