= Washington Monument (West Point) =

Equestrian statue at the Military Academy

- United States
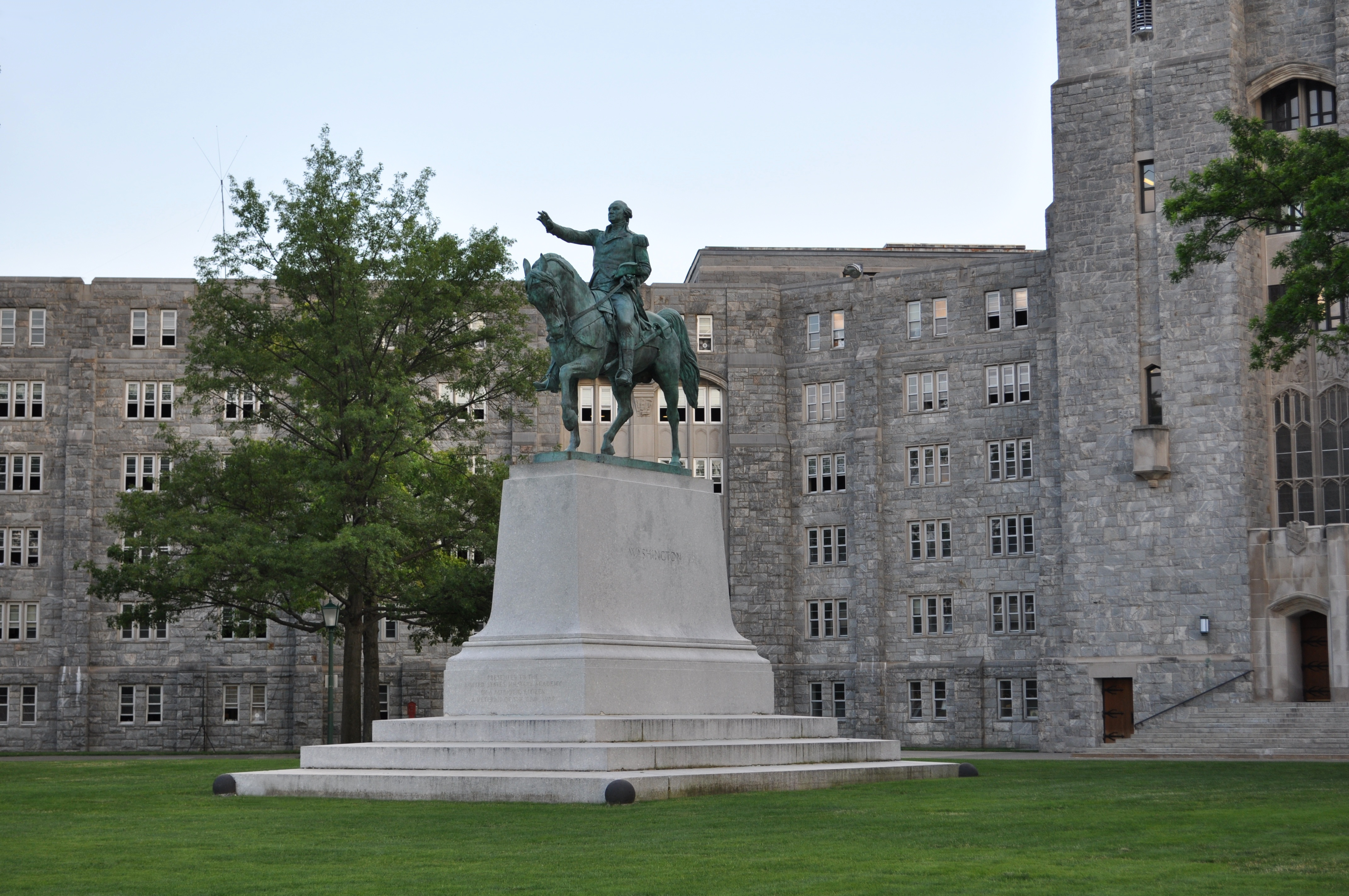
- Washington's equestrian statue on the Monument
- For George Washington
- Unveiled: 1916
- Location: 41°23′31.20″N 73°57′27.96″W near Highland Falls, NY
- Designed by: Henry Kirke Brown

The Washington Monument at West Point is an equestrian monument to George Washington at the United States Military Academy at West Point, New York. The bronze replica of a sculpture that was originally designed by Henry Kirke Brown and erected in Union Square, New York City, in 1856— the first equestrian sculpture cast in the United States— was obtained for West Point by Clarence P. Towne and dedicated in 1916. It formerly sat at the north end of the Plain. After expansion of Washington Hall in 1971, it was moved to its current location outside the hall's front entrance.

== See also ==
- List of statues of George Washington
- List of sculptures of presidents of the United States
