= Stead Park =

Park in Washington, D.C., U.S.

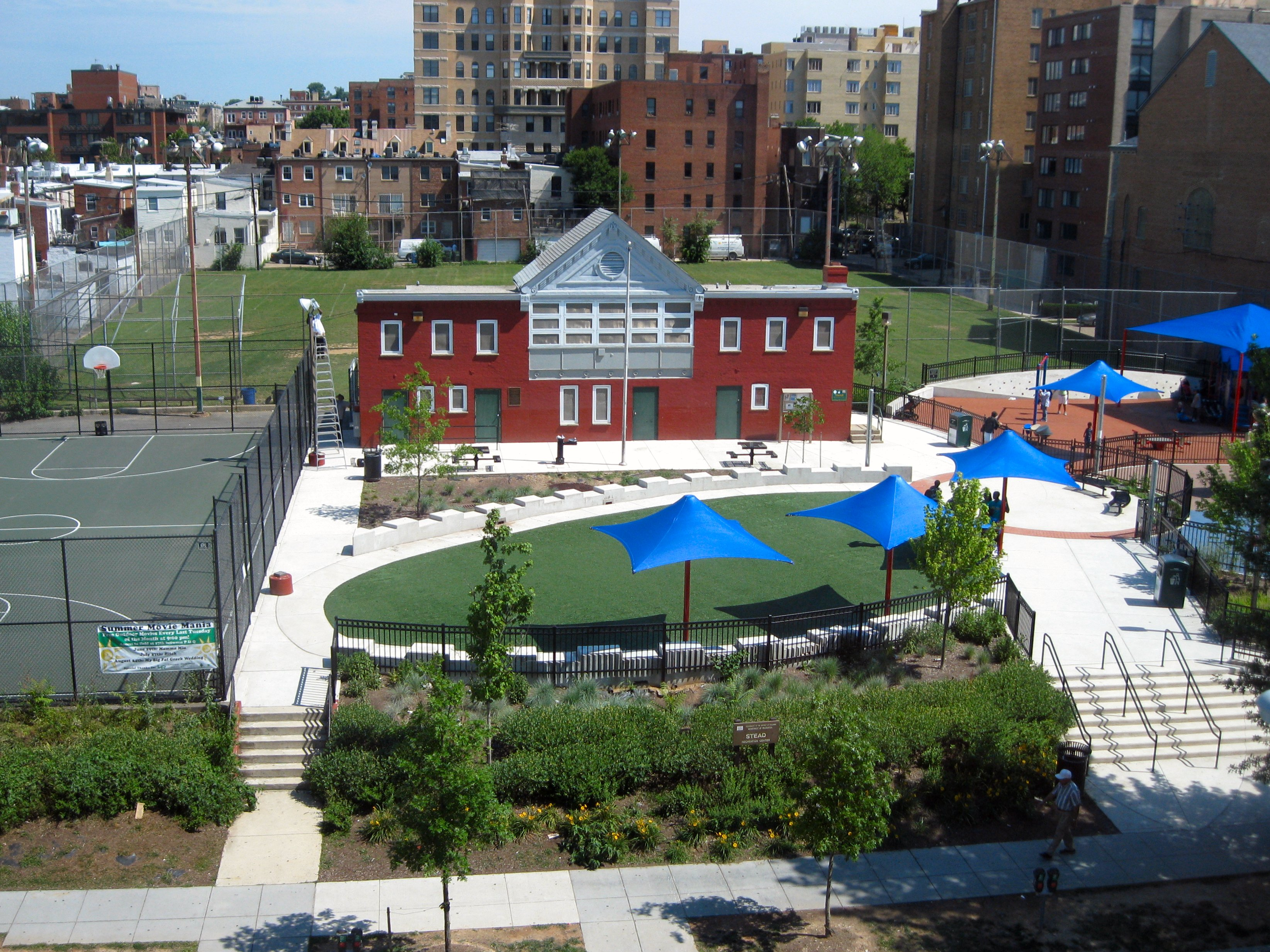
- Stead Park, looking north

- Location within Central Washington, D.C.
- Type: Urban park
- Location: Washington, D.C.
- Coordinates: 38°54′36″N 77°02′15″W
- Area: 1.5 acres (0.61 ha)
- Created: 1953
- Operator: D.C. Parks & Recreation
- Status: Open all year

Stead Park is a 1.5-acre (0.61 ha) municipal park located in the Dupont Circle neighborhood of Northwest Washington, D.C. Among its facilities are Stead Recreation Center, located at 1625 P Street NW; a lighted basketball court; an athletic field with a 60-foot (18 m) baseball diamond; and a playground.

The park and its small staff are administered by the city's Department of Parks and Recreation. Stead Park, whose property was valued at $8,659,560 in 2009, is partially funded by a private trust created by Washington architect Robert Stead (1846-1943). The park is named for Stead's wife, Mary Force Stead.

The park has hosted public events such as Summer Movie Mania, an outdoor screening sponsored by the city government. Stead Park has also been used as a practice field by the Washington Renegades RFC, the first rugby union club in the United States to recruit gay men and men of color.

== History ==
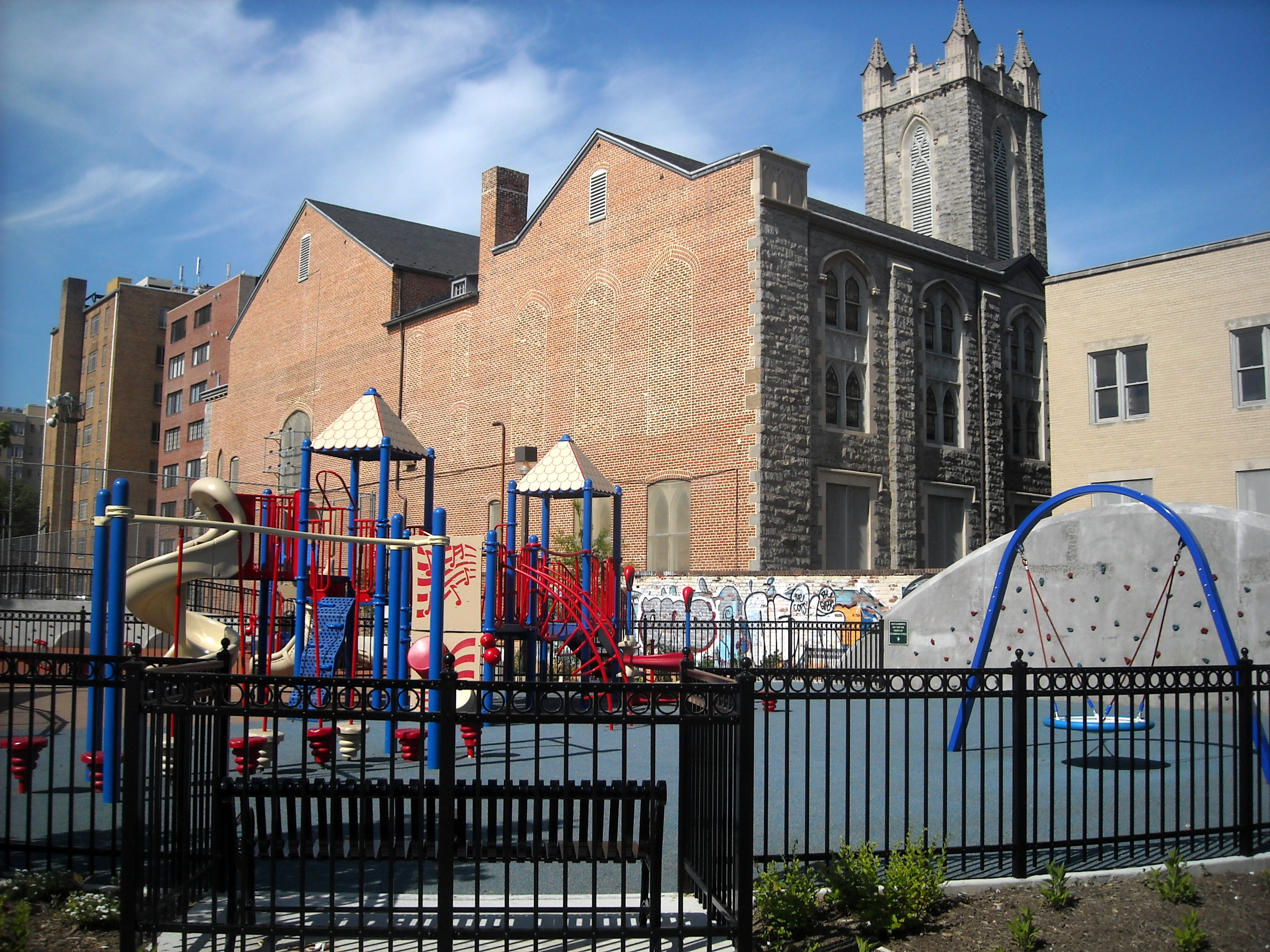
Stead Park playground, after 2008 renovation

The portion of the park next to P Street once held 19th-century row houses. One of them, an 1878 house at 1625 P Street, was built by Henry Hurt, a Confederate Army veteran and president of the Washington and Georgetown Railroad Company. (Archaeological work during a 2008 renovation uncovered artifacts and brick foundations from that house and another at 1613 P Street.)

In 1951, work began on Stead Park, an explicitly unsegregated recreational facility. The single-story fuel sheds from the row houses at 1621, 1623, and 1625 P Street were consolidated, expanded, and topped with a second story; this structure became the park's recreation center. The park was eventually completed at a cost of $80,000 (equivalent to $960,000 in 2025), and formally opened on November 13, 1953.

In 2003, plans for a four-story, multimillion-dollar gay community center to be built on a small section of the aging park sparked a dispute among Dupont Circle residents and the Washington D.C. Center for Gay, Lesbian, Bisexual and Transgender People. The plans were ultimately abandoned.

In 2008, the recreation center and playground were renovated. Work began in April and the park reopened on December 15.

In 2022, the city began a $15.4 million renovation of the recreation center, intended as a "modernization of the existing recreation facility with an addition and to bring it up to ADA standards." The new recreation center opened in Spring 2024. Its design by VMDO Architects allowed the facility to be the first net-zero community center in the District.
