= General Nathanael Greene Homestead =

Historic house in Rhode Island, United States

Coordinates: 41.693889°N 71.544127°W

- U.S. National Register of Historic Places
- U.S. National Historic Landmark
- U.S. Historic district – Contributing property
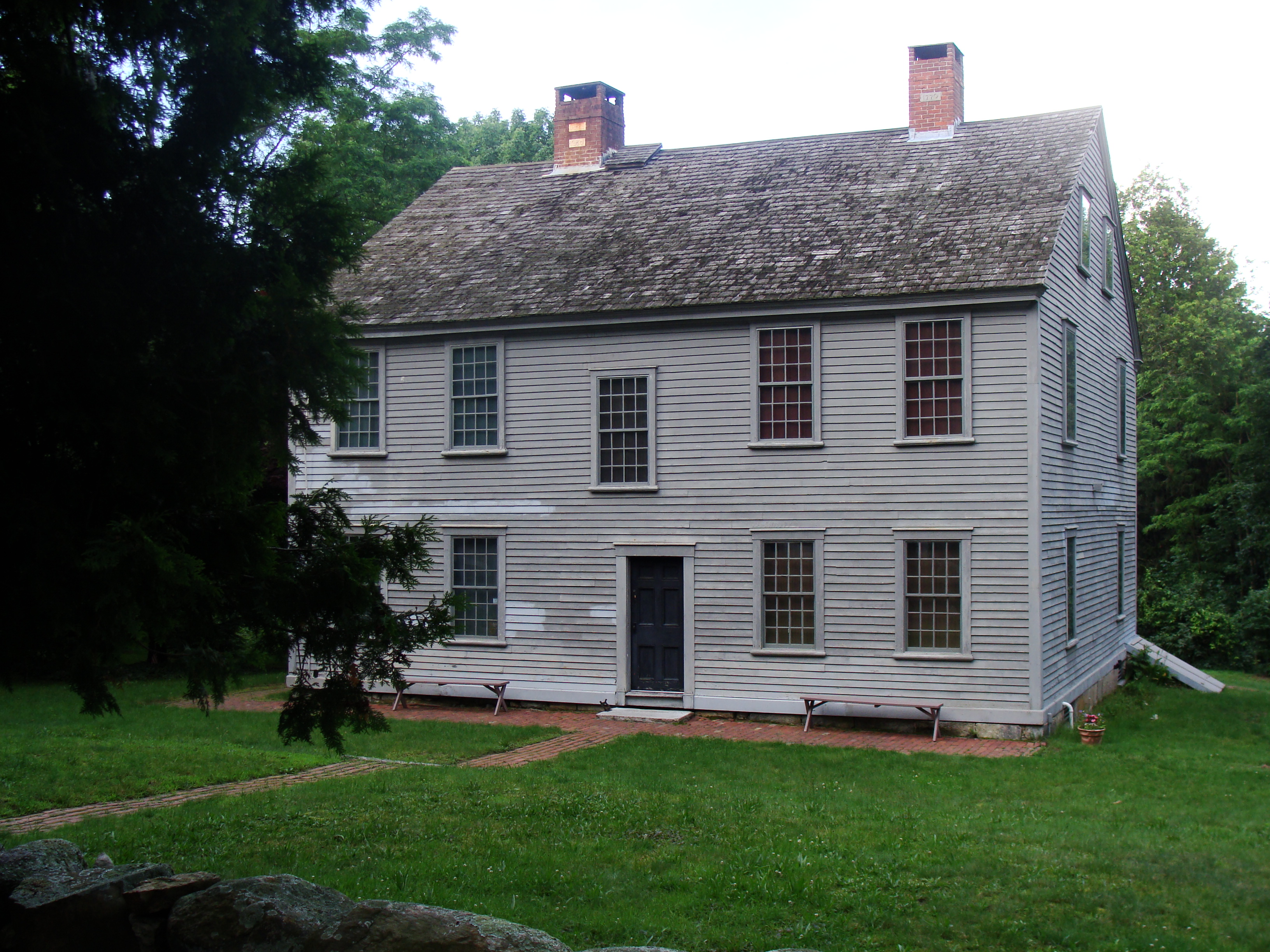
- Greene Homestead, 2009

- Location within Rhode Island Location within the United States
- Location: 50 Taft St., Coventry, Rhode Island
- Built: 1770
- Architect: Nathanael Greene
- Part of: Anthony Village Historic District (ID10000770)
- NRHP reference No.: 71000014

Significant dates
- Added to NRHP: October 7, 1971
- Designated NHL: November 28, 1972
- Designated CP: September 20, 2010

The General Nathanael Greene Homestead, also known as Spell Hall, is a historic house at 50 Taft Street in Coventry, Rhode Island. It was the home of American Revolutionary War general Nathanael Greene from 1770 to 1776, and was owned afterwards by his brother Jacob Greene and his wife Margaret. The house is owned and operated by the General Nathanael Greene Homestead Association, a non-profit organization, and was opened as a museum in 1924.

== Description ==
The house is a 2 1/2-story wood-frame structure with a gable roof, two interior chimneys, and clapboarded exterior. It is five bays wide and two deep, with a center entry framed by pilasters and topped by a transom window, triangular pediment, and carved fanlight motif. The house follows a typical late-Georgian center-hall plan, with four rooms on each level, two on either side of the central hall. On the lower level, the front right room housed Nathanael Greene's 300+ volume library, while the rear room served as the kitchen. The rooms on the left served as parlor and dining room. There are four bedrooms on the second floor, and the attic space was later also converted into bedrooms.

== History ==
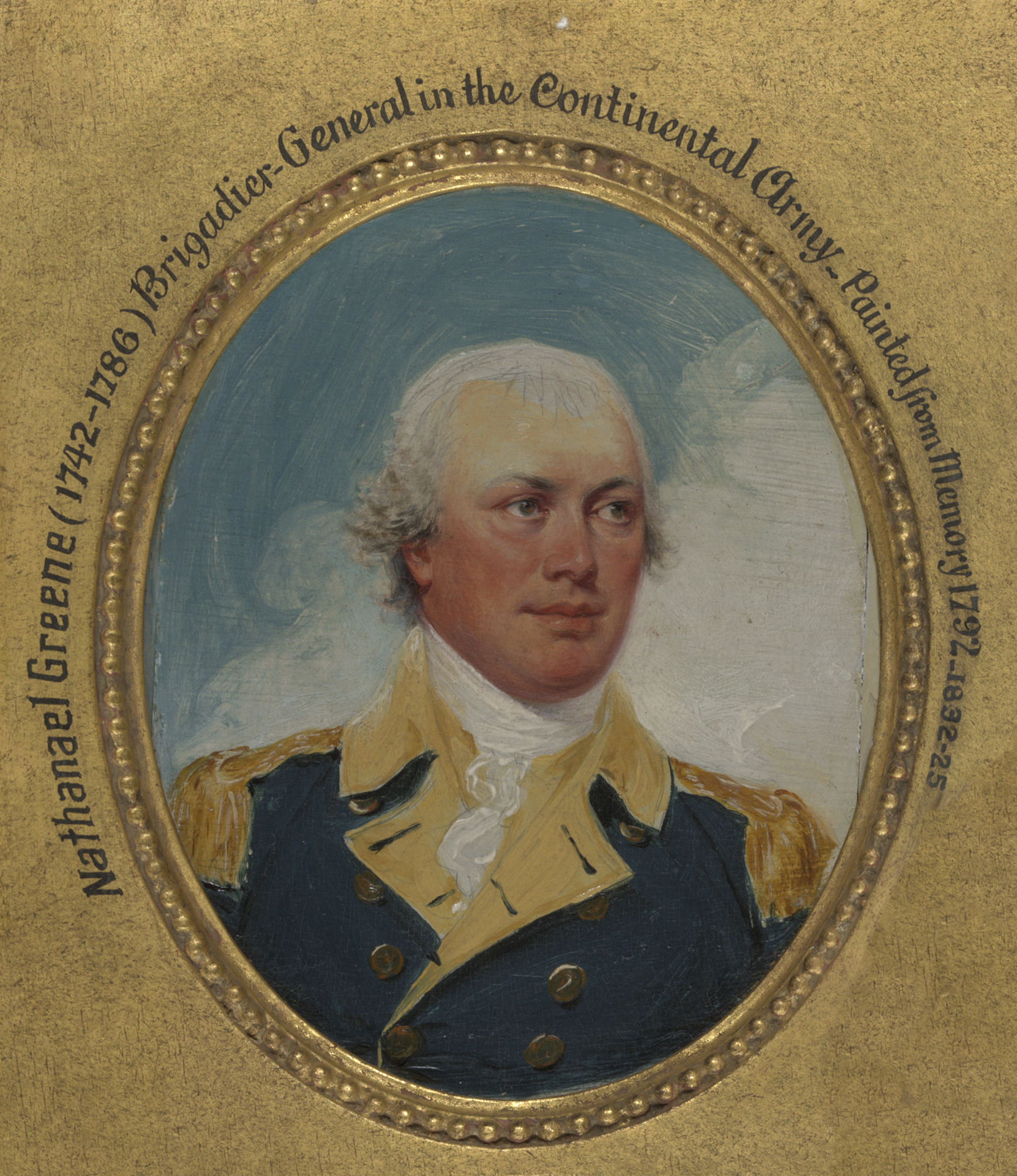
Nathanael Greene

The house was built by Nathanael Greene in 1770, part of a property encompassing 2,000 acres (810 ha), and served as his family's home through the Revolutionary War. In 1783 Greene moved the family to Newport, before eventually relocating to Georgia, where he died in 1786. This house he sold to his brother Jacob. It remained in Greene family hands until 1899, although it became run-down and was used as a tenement house in the later years. In 1919 the Nathanael Greene Homestead Association was formed to restore and care for the property. It is now a house museum, open to the public. The Greene family members have also helped keep the home historic throughout the years.

It was declared a National Historic Landmark in 1972, and was included in the Anthony Village Historic District in 2010.

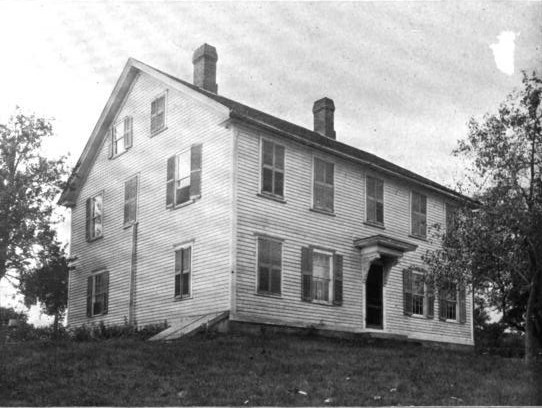
Greene Homestead in 1902

== See also ==
- List of National Historic Landmarks in Rhode Island
- National Register of Historic Places listings in Kent County, Rhode Island

== Images ==
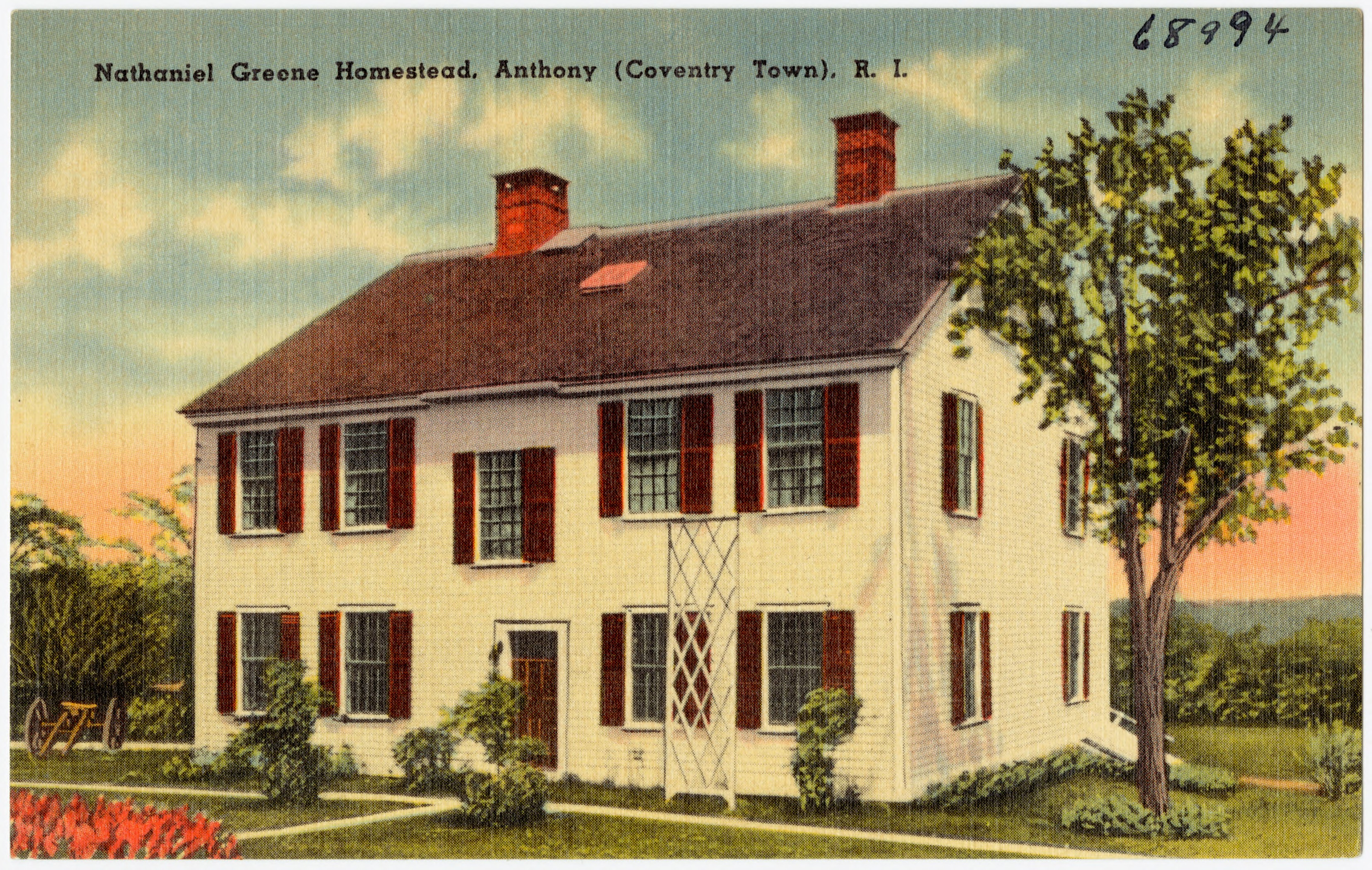
1930s Postcard depicting the house

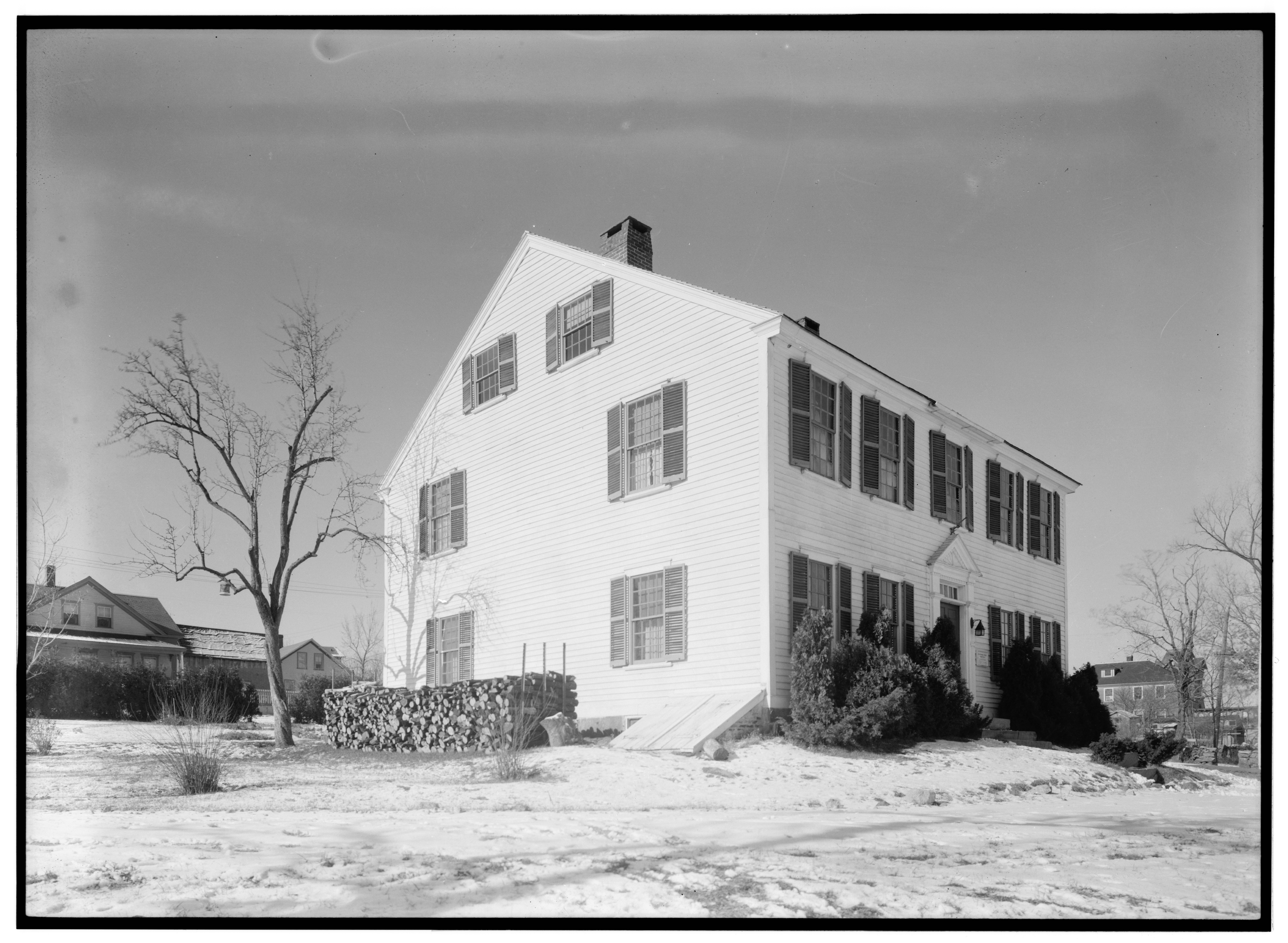
Front and side elevations, 1937

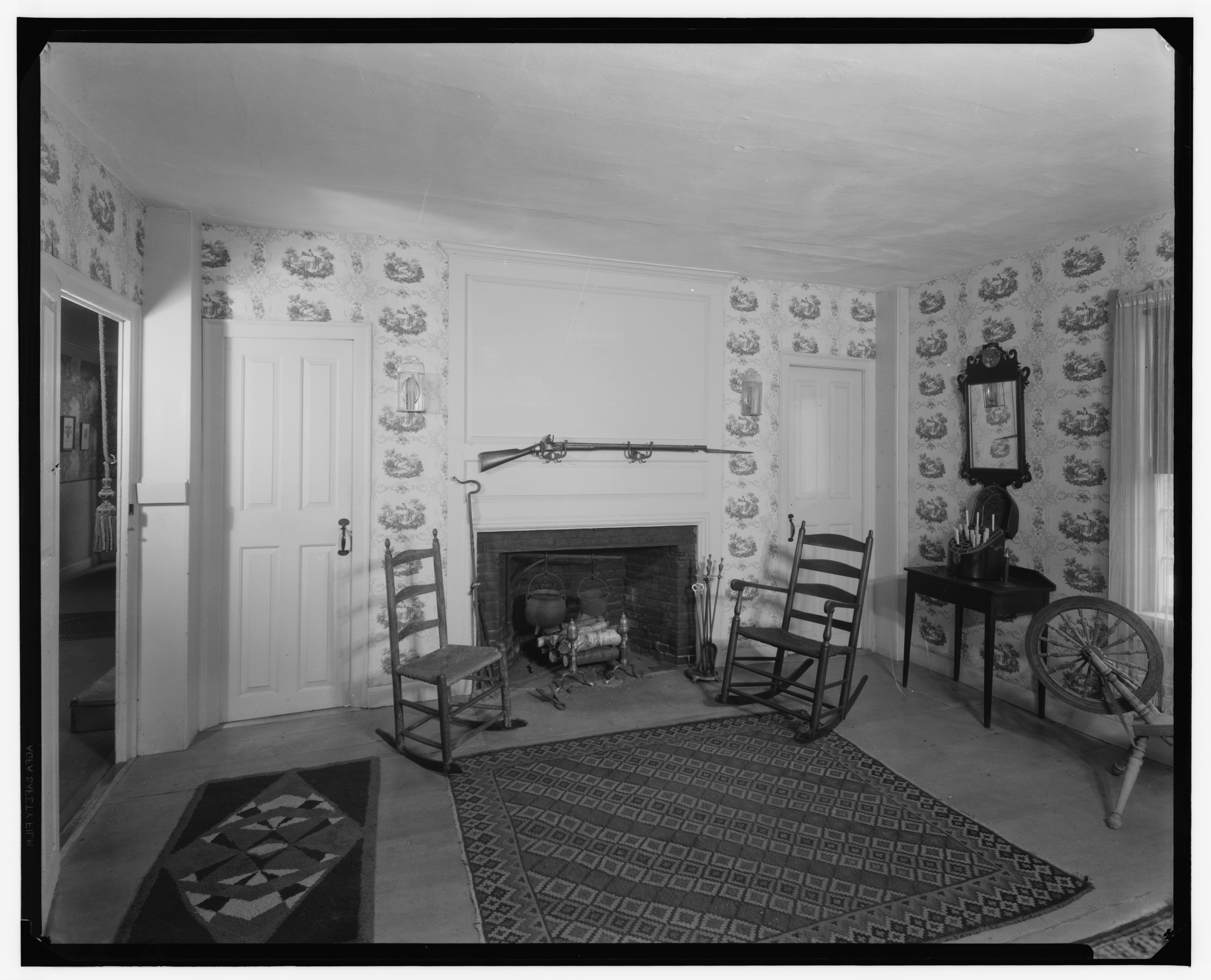
Dining Room and Fireplace Wall
