= Rhode Island =

U.S. state

- State
- Flag Seal
- Nicknames: The Ocean State; Little Rhody
- Motto: Hope
- Anthem: "Rhode Island's It for Me"
- Location of Rhode Island within the United States
- Country: United States
- Before statehood: Colony of Rhode Island and Providence Plantations
- Admitted to the Union: May 29, 1790 (13th)
- Capital (and largest city): Providence
- Largest county or equivalent: Providence
- Largest metro and urban areas: Greater Boston (combined); Providence (metro and urban)

Government
  - Governor: Dan McKee (D)
  - Lieutenant Governor: Sabina Matos (D)
- Legislature: Rhode Island General Assembly
  - Upper house: Senate
  - Lower house: House of Representatives
- Judiciary: Rhode Island Supreme Court
- U.S. senators: Jack Reed (D); Sheldon Whitehouse (D)
- U.S. House delegation: 1: Gabe Amo (D); 2: Seth Magaziner (D) (list)

Area
  - Total: 1,545 sq mi (4,001 km^{2})
  - Land: 1,034 sq mi (2,678 km^{2})
  - Water: 511 sq mi (1,324 km^{2}) 33.1%
  - Rank: 50th

Dimensions
  - Length: 48 mi (77 km)
  - Width: 37 mi (60 km)
- Elevation: 200 ft (60 m)
- Highest elevation (Jerimoth Hill (Note: Elevation adjusted to North American Vertical Datum of 1988)): 810 ft (247 m)
- Lowest elevation (Atlantic Ocean): 0 ft (0 m)

Population (2025)
  - Total: ▲1,114,521
  - Rank: 44th
  - Density: 1,000/sq mi (388/km^{2})
  - Rank: 2nd
  - Median household income: $85,000 (2023)
  - Income rank: 14th
- Demonym: Rhode Islander

Language
  - Official language: De jure: None; De facto: English
- Time zone: UTC−05:00 (Eastern)
  - Summer (DST): UTC−04:00 (EDT)
- USPS abbreviation: RI
- ISO 3166 code: US-RI
- Traditional abbreviation: R.I.
- Latitude: 41° 09′ N to 42° 01′ N
- Longitude: 71° 07′ W to 71° 54′ W
- Website: ri.gov

Rhode Island (/ˌroʊd -/ ROHD) is a state in the New England region of the Northeastern United States. It borders Connecticut to its west; Massachusetts to its north and east; and the Atlantic Ocean to its south via Rhode Island Sound and Block Island Sound; and shares a small maritime border with New York, east of Long Island. Rhode Island is the smallest U.S. state by area and the seventh-least populous, with slightly more than 1.11 million residents as of 2025. However, its population has continually recorded growth in every decennial census since 1790, and it is the second-most densely populated state after New Jersey. The state takes its name from the eponymous island, though most of its land area is on the mainland. Providence is its capital and most populous city.

Native Americans lived around Narragansett Bay before English settlers began arriving in the early 17th century. Rhode Island was unique among the Thirteen British Colonies in having been founded by a refugee, Roger Williams, who fled religious persecution in the Massachusetts Bay Colony to establish a haven for religious liberty. He founded Providence in 1636 on land purchased from local tribes, creating the first settlement in North America with an explicitly secular government. The Colony of Rhode Island and Providence Plantations subsequently became a destination for religious and political dissenters and social outcasts, earning it the moniker "Rogue's Island".

Rhode Island was the first colony to call for a Continental Congress, in 1774, and the first to renounce its allegiance to the British Crown, on May 4, 1776. After the American Revolution, during which it was heavily occupied and contested, Rhode Island became the fourth state to ratify the Articles of Confederation, on February 9, 1778. Because its citizens favored a weaker central government, it boycotted the 1787 convention that had drafted the United States Constitution, which it initially refused to ratify; it finally ratified it on May 29, 1790, the last of the original 13 states to do so.

The state was officially named the State of Rhode Island and Providence Plantations since the colonial era but came to be commonly known as "Rhode Island". On November 3, 2020, the state's voters approved an amendment to the state constitution formally dropping "and Providence Plantations" from its full name. Its official nickname, found on its welcome sign, is the "Ocean State", a reference to its 400 mi (640 km) of coastline and the large bays and inlets that make up about 14% of its area.

== Name ==
=== Origins ===
Despite its name, most of Rhode Island is on the U.S. mainland. Its official name was State of Rhode Island and Providence Plantations from its beginning in 1636 until 2020, and it is referred to in that manner in a section of the United States Constitution describing how representatives were to be apportioned before a census could be conducted. This name was derived from the merger of Colonial settlements around Narragansett Bay, and outside the jurisdiction of Plymouth colony. The settlements of Rhode Island (Newport and Portsmouth) were on Rhode Island, also known as Aquidneck Island. (Note: This island is the largest of several islands in Narragansett Bay.) Providence Plantations referred to settlements on the mainland of Providence and Warwick.

It is unclear how the island came to be named Rhode Island, but two historical events may have been influential:

- Explorer Giovanni da Verrazzano noted the presence of an island near the mouth of Narragansett Bay in 1524 which he likened to the island of Rhodes off the coast of Greece. Subsequent European explorers were unable to precisely identify the island Verrazzano described, but the colonists who settled the area assumed that it was this island. (Note: Giovanni da Verrazzano named a place on Rhode Island Puntum Iovianum in honor of his friend Paolo Giovio (Jovium in Latin) (1483–1542), humanist and historian. Giovio owned the Cèllere Codex of Verrazzano containing the text of his first trip.)
- Adriaen Block passed by the island during his expeditions in the 1610s, and described it in a 1625 account of his travels as "an island of reddish appearance", which was "een rodlich Eylande" in 17th-century Dutch, meaning a red or reddish island, supposedly evolving into the designation Rhode Island. Historians have theorized that this "reddish appearance" resulted from either red autumn foliage or red clay on portions of the shore. (This is the explanation adopted by the state's website.)

The earliest documented use of the name "Rhode Island" for Aquidneck was in 1637 by Roger Williams. The name was officially applied to the island in 1644 with these words: "Aquethneck shall be henceforth called the Isle of Rodes or Rhode-Island." The name "Isle of Rodes" is used in a legal document as late as 1646. Dutch maps as early as 1659 call the island "Red Island" (Roodt Eylandt).

=== 2020 change ===
The first English settlement in Rhode Island was the town of Providence, which the Narragansett granted to Roger Williams in 1636. At that time, Williams obtained no permission from the English crown, as he believed the English had no legitimate claim on Narragansett and Wampanoag territory. Williams traveled to London in 1643, during the English Civil War, to obtain legal recognition of the new settlements. A patent was granted to "the incorporation of Providence Plantations in Narragansett Bay in New England" by the Parliamentary committee on Foreign Plantations. After the English Civil war, a Royal Charter was granted in 1663, giving the colony an official name of the "Governor and Company of the English Colony of Rhode Island and Providence Plantations, in New England, in America." Following the American Revolution, in 1790 the new state incorporated as the "State of Rhode Island and Providence Plantations". However, as matter of convenience, the state came to be commonly known as simply "Rhode Island".

The word plantation in the state's name became a contested issue during the 20th century and the increased awareness of slavery and its role in early Rhode Island history. The General Assembly voted in 2009 to hold a referendum in November 2010 on removing "and Providence Plantations" from the official name. Advocates for excising plantation argued that the word symbolized a legacy of disenfranchisement for many Rhode Islanders, as well as the proliferation of slavery in the colonies and in the post-colonial United States. Advocates for retaining the name argued that plantation was simply an archaic synonym for colony and bore no relation to slavery. Voters overwhelmingly (78% to 22%) chose to retain the entire original name.

In June 2020, state senator Harold Metts introduced a resolution for another ballot referendum on the subject, saying, "Whatever the meaning of the term 'plantations' in the context of Rhode Island's history, it carries a horrific connotation when considering the tragic and racist history of our nation." Governor Gina Raimondo issued an executive order to remove the phrase from a range of official documents and state websites. In July, amidst the George Floyd protests and nationwide calls to address systemic racism, the resolution referring the question to the voters was passed by both houses of the Rhode Island General Assembly: 69–1 in the House of Representatives, and 35–0 in the Senate. The change was then approved by voters 52.8% to 47.2% as 2020 Rhode Island Question 1, taking effect in November 2020 upon certification of the results.

== History ==
=== Colonial era: 1636–1770 ===
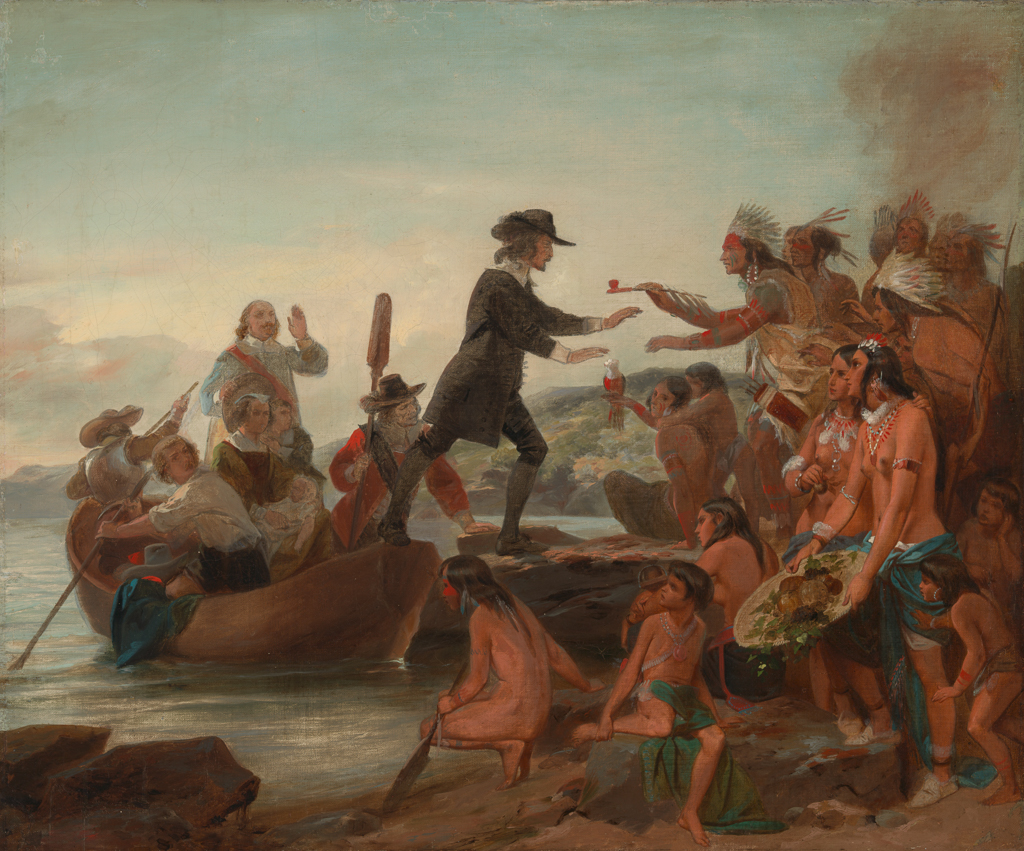
In 1636, Roger Williams and his followers founded the settlement of Providence Plantations.

At the onset of European colonization what is now Rhode Island was inhabited mainly by five Native American tribes — by far most of the state's territory was inhabited by the Narragansett, eastern borderlands were occupied by the Wampanoag, south-western coast by the Niantic, western borderlands by the Pequot and northern borderlands by the Nipmuc. In 1636, Roger Williams was banished from the Massachusetts Bay Colony for his religious views, and he settled at the top of Narragansett Bay on land sold or given to him by Narragansett sachem Canonicus. He named the site Providence, "having a sense of God's merciful providence unto me in my distress", and it became a place of religious freedom where all were welcome.

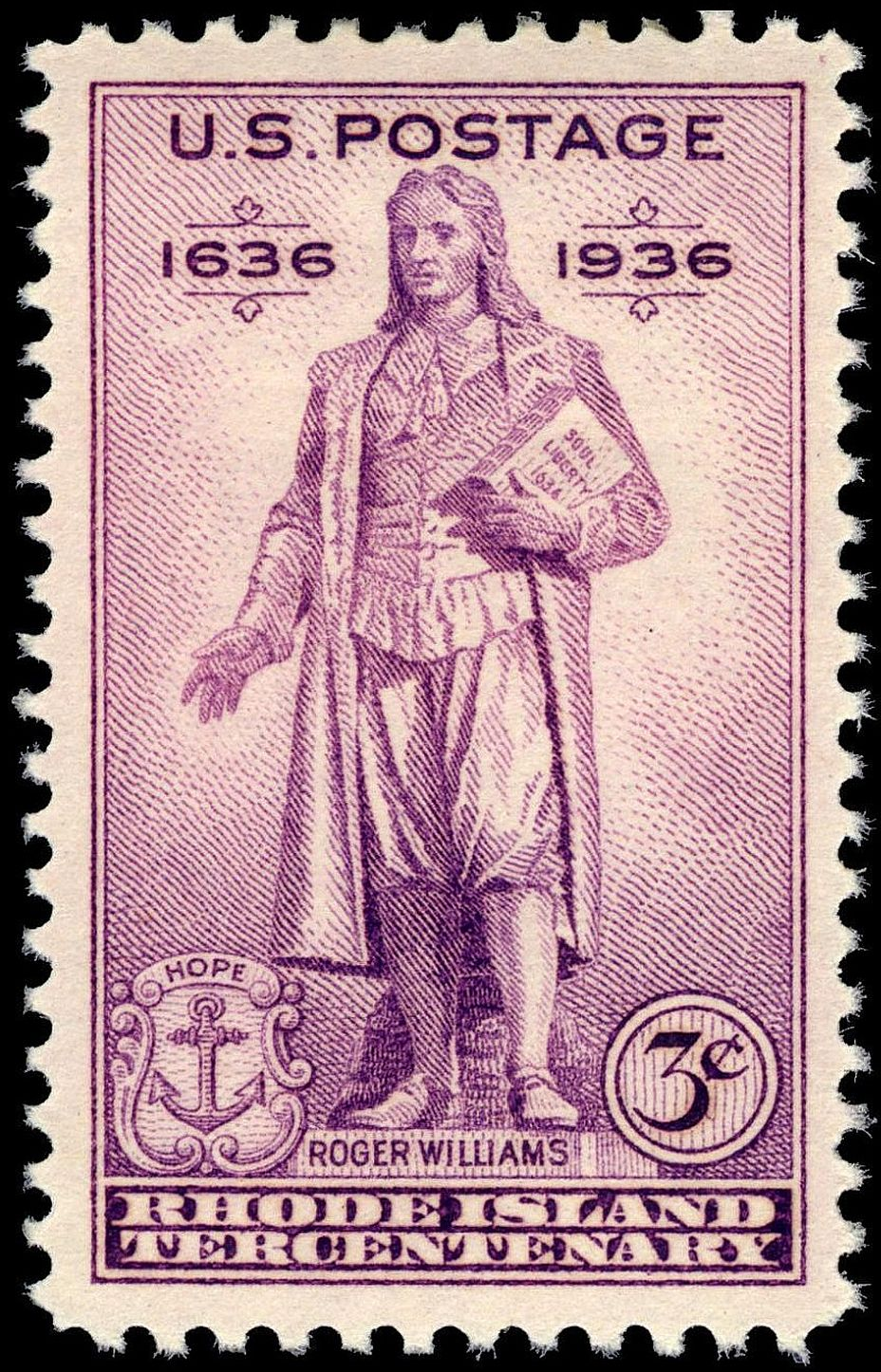
In 1936, on the 300th anniversary of the settlement of Rhode Island in 1636, the U.S. Post Office issued a commemorative stamp, depicting Roger Williams

In 1638 (after conferring with Williams), Anne Hutchinson, William Coddington, John Clarke, Philip Sherman, and other religious dissenters were allowed to settle on Aquidneck Island (also known as Rhode Island), by the Narragansett Sachems Canonicus and Miantonomi. They were given a few items in reciprocity for their generosity. However, as Roger Williams made clear in a letter to John Winthrop in June 1638: "Sir, concerning the islands Prudence and…Aquedenick…neither of them were sold properly, for a thousand fathom would not have bought either, by strangers. The truth is, not a penny was demanded for either, and what was paid was only gratuity, though I chose, for better assurance and form, to call it sale." This settlement was first called Pocasset and then changed in 1639 to Portsmouth. The town was governed by the Portsmouth Compact. The island's southern part became the separate settlement of Newport after disagreements among the founders.

Samuel Gorton purchased lands at Shawomet in 1642 from the Narragansetts, precipitating a dispute with the Massachusetts Bay Colony. In 1644, Providence, Portsmouth, and Newport united for their common independence as the Colony of Rhode Island and Providence Plantations, governed by an elected council and "president". Gorton received a separate charter for his settlement in 1648 which he named Warwick after his patron.

Metacomet was the Wampanoag tribe's war leader, whom the colonists called King Philip. They invaded and burned down several of the towns in the area during King Philip's War (1675–1676), including Providence which was attacked twice. A force of Massachusetts, Connecticut, and Plymouth militia under General Josiah Winslow invaded and destroyed the fortified Narragansett Indian village in the Great Swamp in South Kingstown, Rhode Island, on December 19, 1675. In one of the final actions of the war, an Indian associated with Benjamin Church killed King Philip in Bristol, Rhode Island.

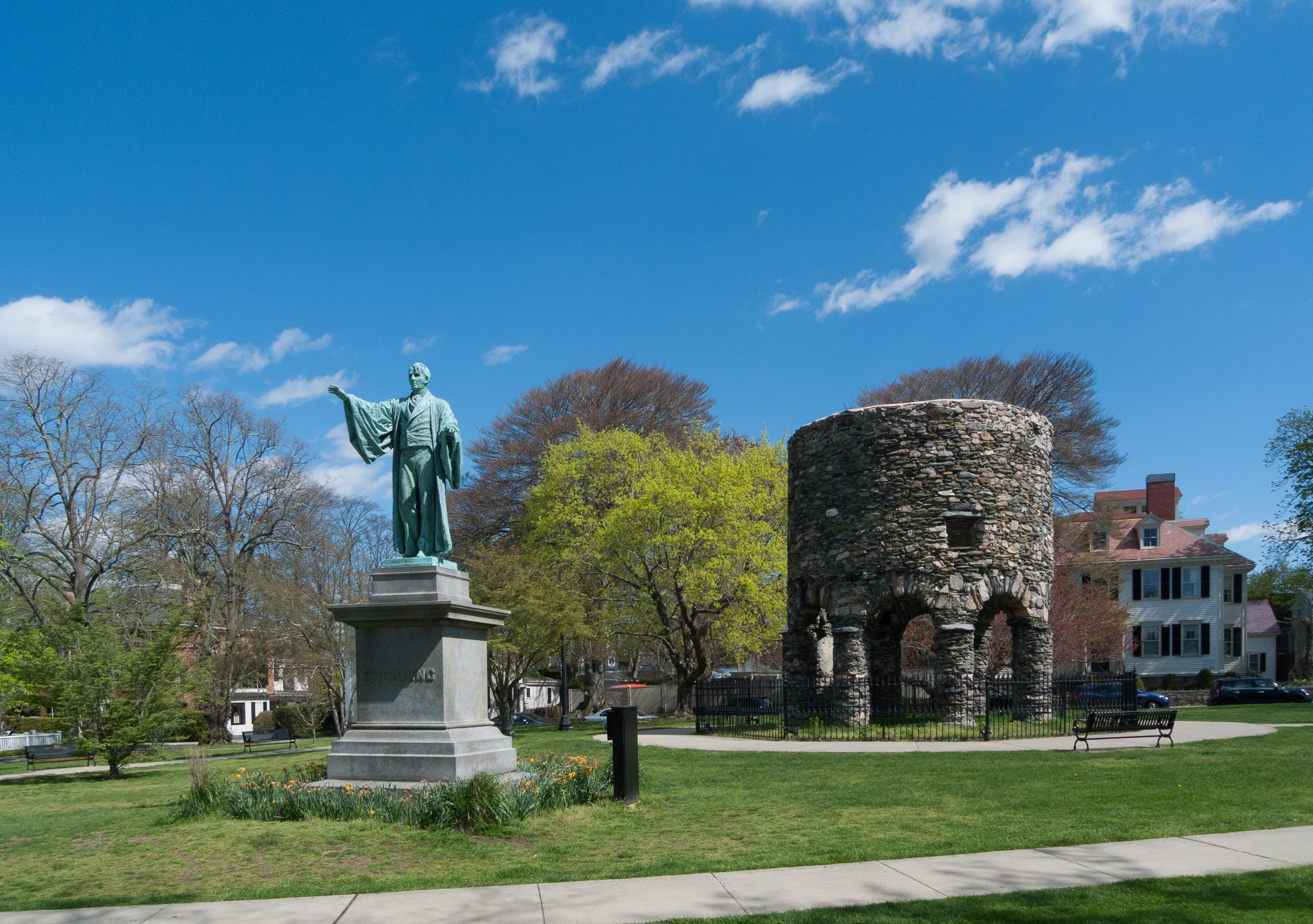
In 1680, Newport was the third largest Anglo-American city. It remained a prosperous population center until the 1770s.

The colony was amalgamated into the Dominion of New England in 1686, as King James II attempted to enforce royal authority over the autonomous colonies in British North America, but the colony regained its independence under the Royal Charter after the Glorious Revolution of 1688. Slaves were introduced in Rhode Island at this time, although there is no record of any law legalizing slave-holding. The colony later prospered under the slave trade, distilling rum to sell in Africa as part of a profitable triangular trade in slaves and sugar with the Caribbean. Rhode Island's legislative body passed an act in 1652 abolishing the holding of slaves (the first British colony to do so), but this edict was never enforced and Rhode Island continued to be heavily involved in the slave trade during the post-revolution era. In 1774, the slave population of Rhode Island was 6.3% of the total (nearly twice the ratio of other New England colonies).

Brown University was founded in 1764 as the college in the British Colony of Rhode Island and Providence Plantations. It was one of nine Colonial colleges granted charters before the American Revolution and was the first college in America to accept students regardless of religious affiliation.

=== Revolutionary to Civil War period: 1770–1860 ===
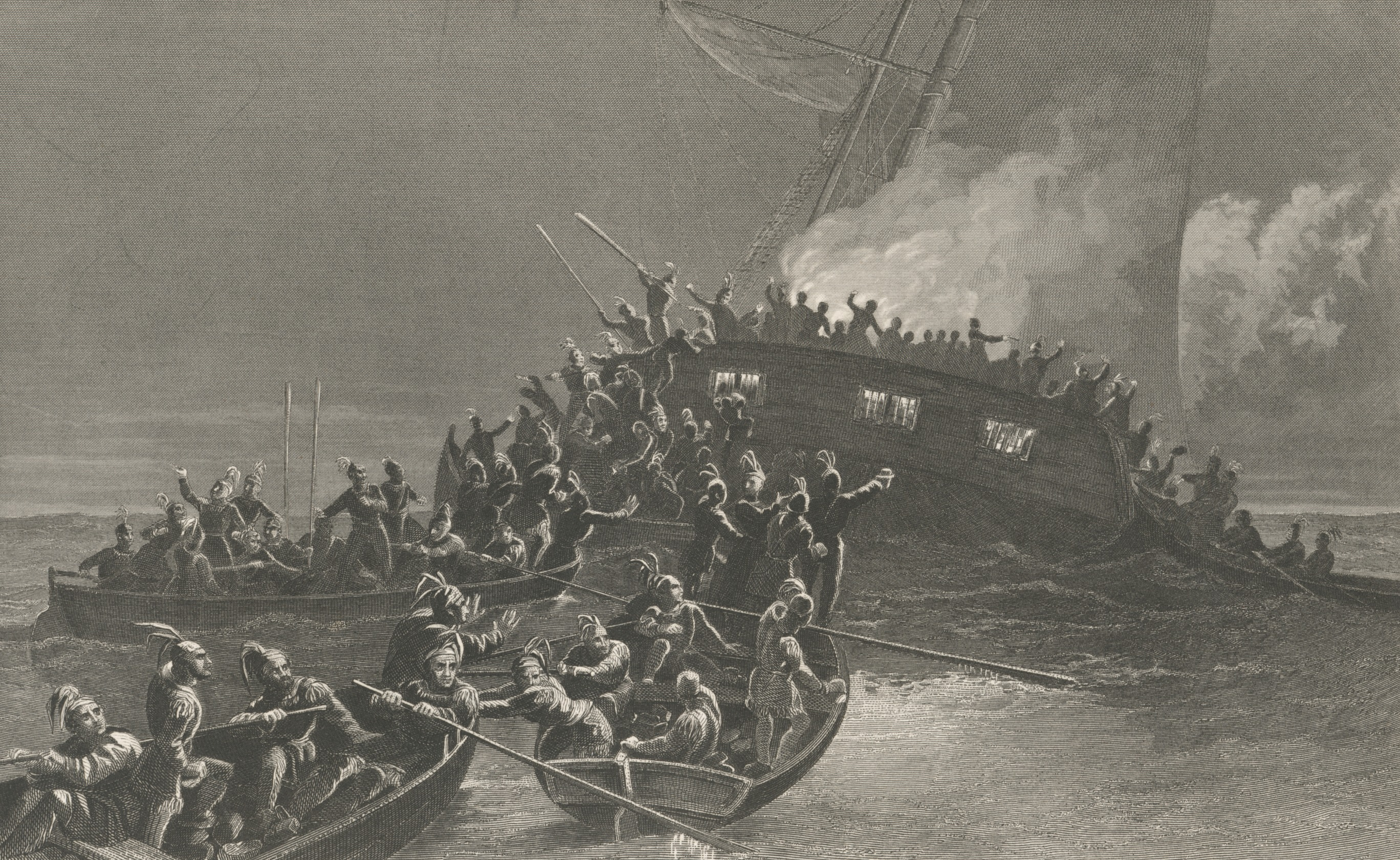
Providence Revolutionaries burned HMS Gaspee in Warwick in protest of British customs laws.

Rhode Island's tradition of independence and dissent gave it a prominent role in the American Revolution. At approximately 2 a.m. on June 10, 1772, a band of Providence residents attacked the grounded revenue schooner HMS Gaspée, burning it to the waterline for enforcing unpopular trade regulations within Narragansett Bay. Rhode Island was the first of the thirteen colonies to renounce its allegiance to the British Crown on May 4, 1776. It was also the last of the thirteen colonies to ratify the United States Constitution on May 29, 1790, and only under threat of heavy trade tariffs from the other former colonies and after assurances were made that a Bill of Rights would become part of the Constitution.

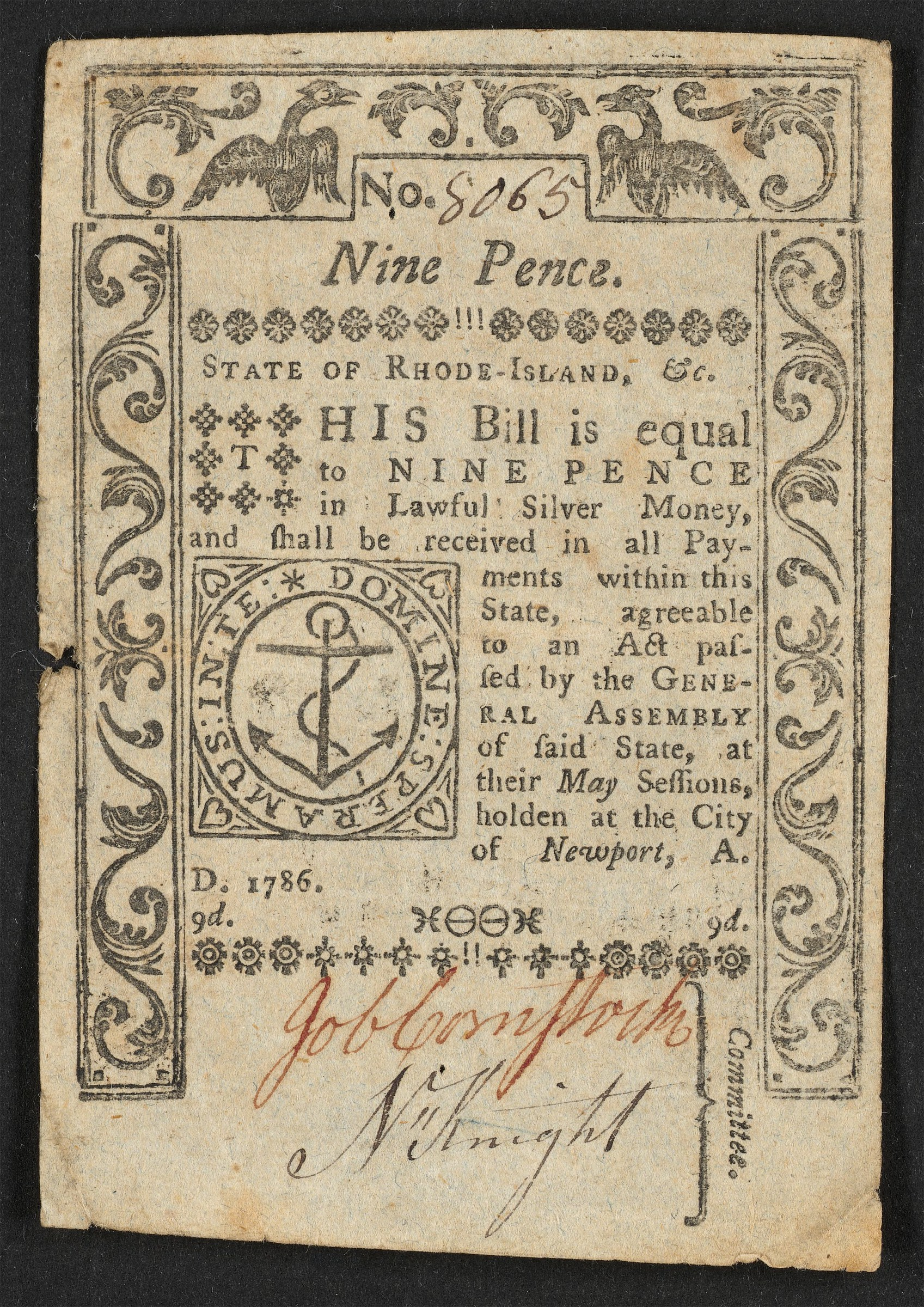
A nine-pence banknote issued by Rhode Island in 1786

During the Revolution, the British occupied Newport in December 1776. A combined Franco-American force fought to drive them off Aquidneck Island. Portsmouth was the site of the first African-American military unit, the 1st Rhode Island Regiment, to fight for the U.S. in the unsuccessful Battle of Rhode Island of August 29, 1778. A month earlier, the appearance of a French fleet off Newport caused the British to scuttle some of their own ships in an attempt to block the harbor. The British abandoned Newport in October 1779, concentrating their forces in New York City. An expedition of 5,500 French troops under Count Rochambeau arrived in Newport by sea on July 10, 1780. The 1781 march to Yorktown, Virginia culminated in the defeat of the British at the Siege of Yorktown and the Battle of the Chesapeake.

Rhode Island was also heavily involved in the Industrial Revolution, which began in America in 1787 when Thomas Somers reproduced textile machine plans which he imported from England. He helped to produce the Beverly Cotton Manufactory, in which Moses Brown of Providence took an interest. Moses Brown teamed up with Samuel Slater and helped to create the second cotton mill in America, a water-powered textile mill. The Industrial Revolution moved large numbers of workers into the cities. With the 1663 colonial charter still in effect, voting was restricted to landowners holding at least $134 in property. At the time of the revolution, 80% of White men in Rhode Island could vote; by 1840, only 40% were still eligible. The charter apportioned legislative seats equally among the state's towns, over-representing rural areas and under-representing the growing industrial centers. Additionally, the charter disallowed landless citizens from filing civil suits without endorsement from a landowner. Bills were periodically introduced in the legislature to expand suffrage, but they were invariably defeated.

In 1841, activists led by Thomas W. Dorr organized an extralegal convention to draft a state constitution, arguing the charter government violated the Guarantee Clause in Article Four, Section Four of the United States Constitution. In 1842, the charter government and Dorr's supporters held separate elections, and two rival governments claimed sovereignty over the state. Dorr's supporters led an armed rebellion against the charter government, and Dorr was arrested and imprisoned for treason against the state.

In response, the legislature drafted a state constitution which replaced property requirements for American-born citizens with a $1 poll tax, equivalent to $33 in 2025. In a heavily boycotted election in November 1842, voters approved the constitution. Voters also declined to limit the change to "white" men, thus re-enfranchising Black men—Black men meeting the property requirements had been able to vote in Rhode Island until 1822. The constitution also ended slavery. Immigrants remained subject to the property requirement, effectively disenfranchising many Irish-Americans and maintaining urban under-representation. In 1849, in Luther v. Borden, the U.S. Supreme Court declined to rule on the constitutional question raised in Dorr's rebellion, holding that it was a political question outside its jurisdiction.

In the early 19th century, Rhode Island was subject to a tuberculosis outbreak which led to public hysteria about vampirism.

=== Civil War ===
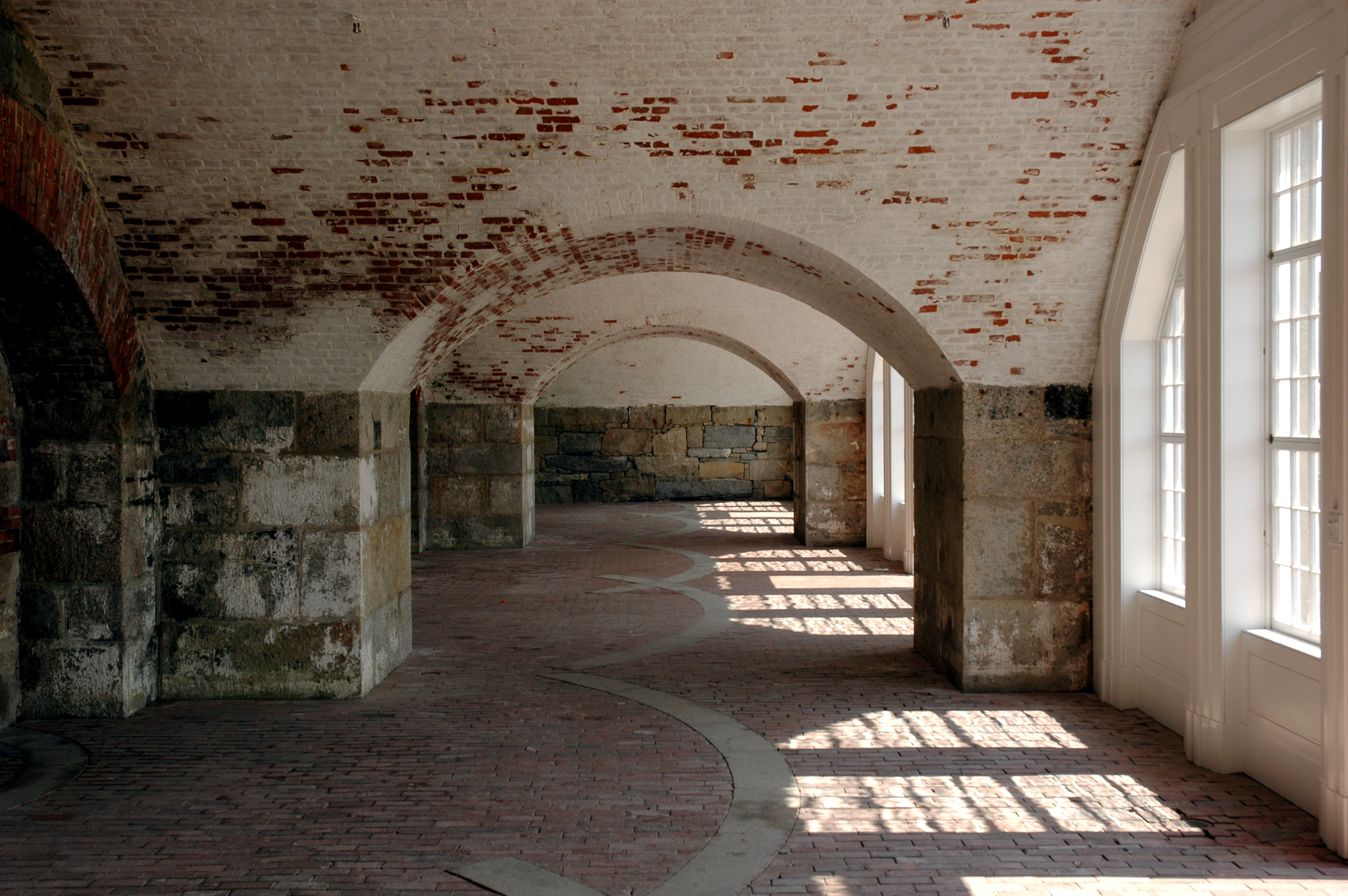
The United States Naval Academy was moved to Fort Adams in Newport during the Civil War.

During the American Civil War, Rhode Island was the first Union state to send troops in response to President Lincoln's request for help from the states. Rhode Island furnished 23,700 fighting men, of whom 1,685 died. On the home front, Rhode Island and the other northern states used their industrial capacity to supply the Union Army with the materials it needed to win the war. The United States Naval Academy moved to Rhode Island temporarily during the war.

In 1866, Rhode Island abolished racial segregation in public schools throughout the state.

=== Gilded Age ===
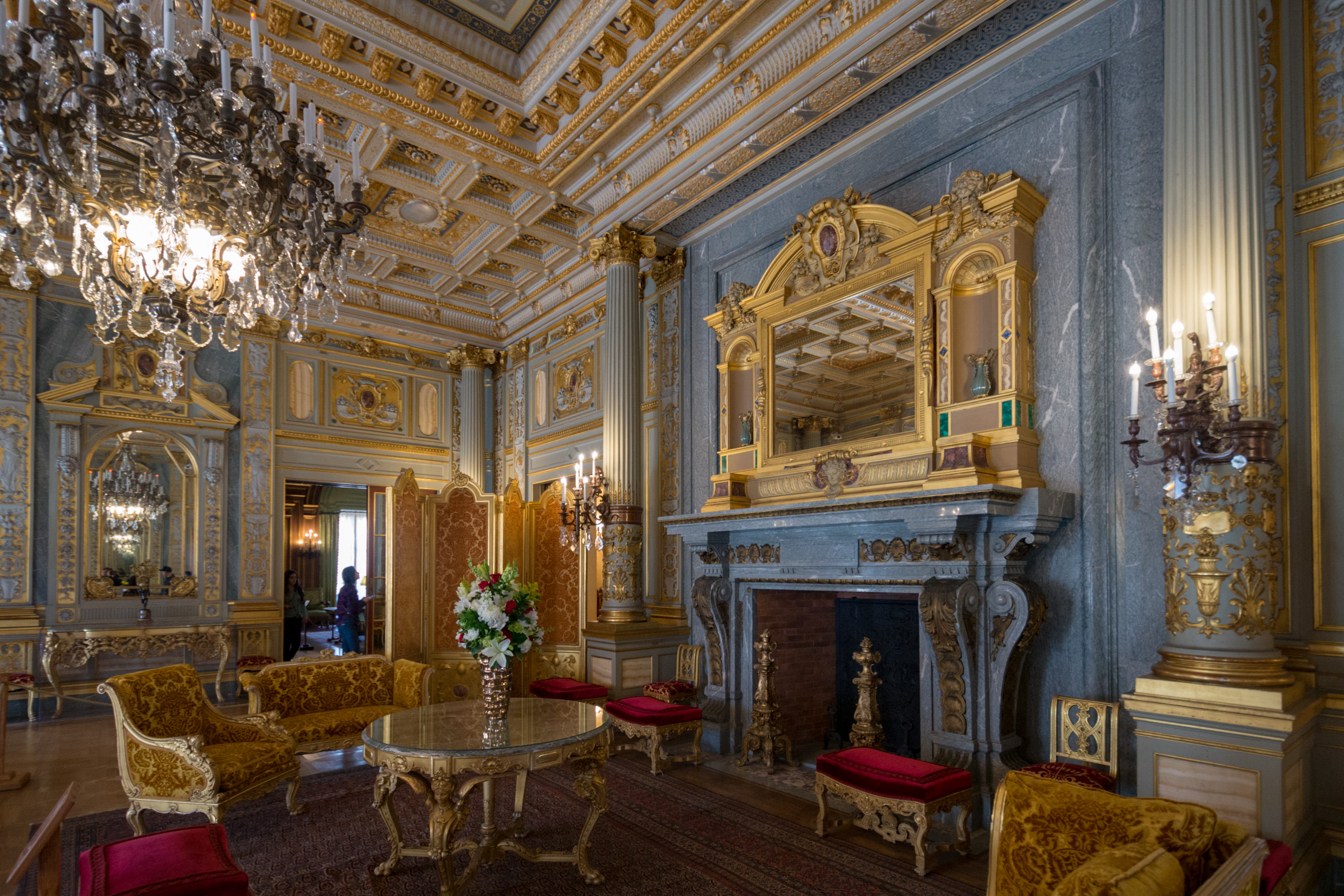
Interior of The Breakers, a Newport symbol of the Gilded Age

The 50 years following the Civil War were a time of prosperity and affluence that author William G. McLoughlin calls "Rhode Island's halcyon era". Rhode Island was a center of the Gilded Age and provided a home or summer home to many of the country's most prominent industrialists. This was a time of growth in textile mills and manufacturing and brought an influx of immigrants to fill those jobs, bringing population growth and urbanization. In Newport, New York's wealthiest industrialists created a summer haven to socialize and build grand mansions. Thousands of French-Canadian, Italian, Irish, and Portuguese immigrants arrived to fill jobs in the textile and manufacturing mills in Providence, Pawtucket, Central Falls, and Woonsocket.

=== World War I ===
During World War I, Rhode Island furnished 28,817 soldiers, of whom 612 died. After the war, the state was hit hard by the Spanish Influenza.

In the 1920s and 1930s, rural Rhode Island saw a surge in Ku Klux Klan membership, largely in reaction to large waves of immigrants moving to the state. The Klan is believed to be responsible for burning the Watchman Industrial School in Scituate, which was a school for African-American children.

=== Growth in the modern era: 1929–present ===
Since the Great Depression, the Rhode Island Democratic Party has dominated local politics. Rhode Island has comprehensive health insurance for low-income children and a large social safety net. However, many urban areas still have a high rate of child poverty. Due to an influx of residents from Boston, increasing housing costs have resulted in more homelessness in Rhode Island.

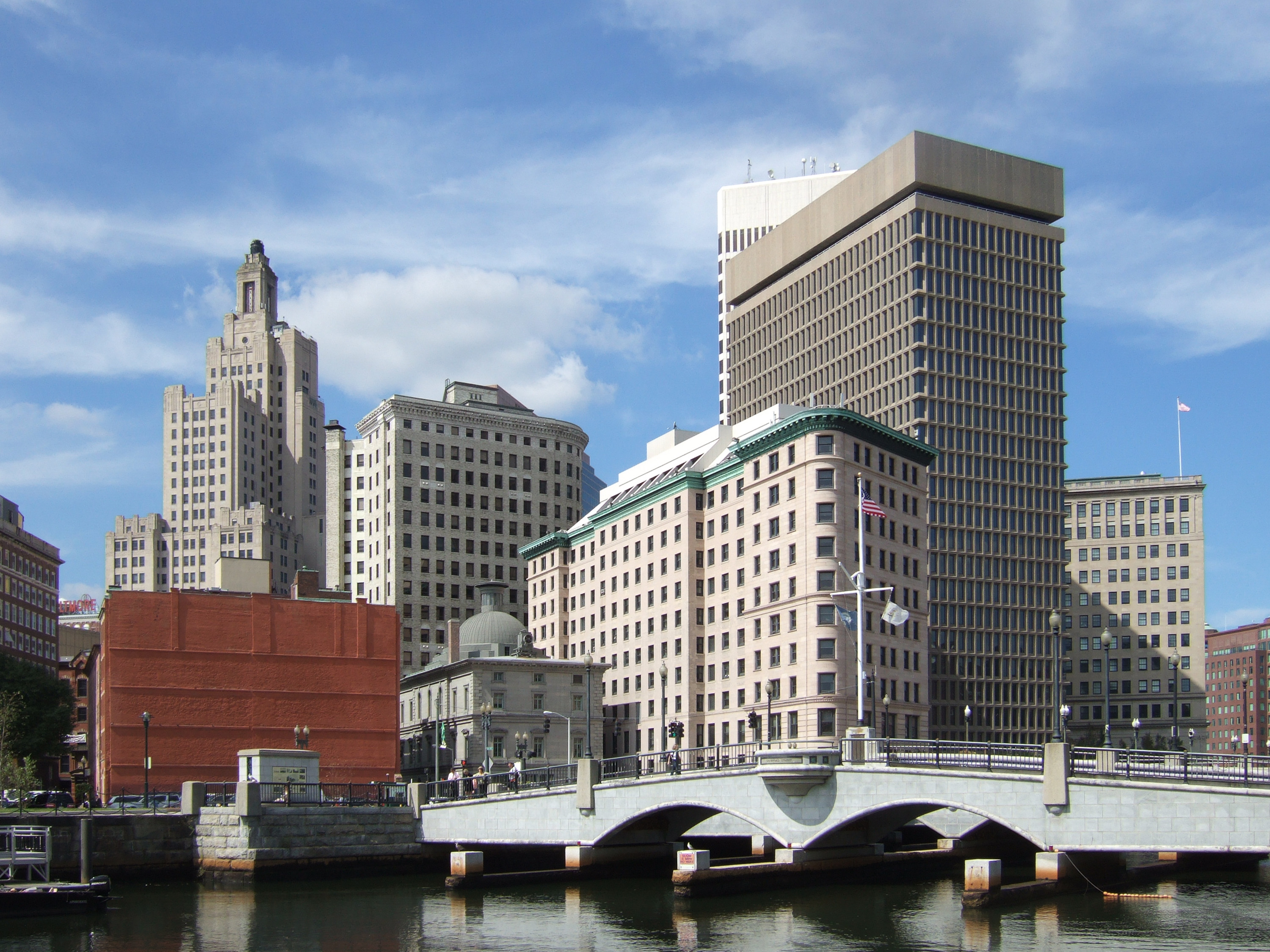
Downtown Providence in 2008

The 350th anniversary of the founding of Rhode Island was celebrated with a free concert held on the tarmac of the Quonset State Airport on August 31, 1986. Performers included Chuck Berry, Tommy James, and headliner Bob Hope.

== Geography ==
Topographic map of Rhode Island

Rhode Island covers an area of 1,034 square miles (2,678 km^{2}) within the New England region of the Northeastern United States and is bordered on the north and east by Massachusetts, on the west by Connecticut, and on the south by Rhode Island Sound and the Atlantic Ocean. It shares a narrow maritime border with New York State between Block Island and Long Island. The state's mean elevation is 200 feet (61 m). It is only 37 miles (60 km) wide and 48 miles (77 km) long, yet the state has a tidal shoreline on Narragansett Bay and the Atlantic Ocean of 384 miles (618 km).

Rhode Island is nicknamed the Ocean State and has a number of oceanfront beaches. It is mostly flat with no real mountains, and the state's highest natural point is Jerimoth Hill, 812 feet (247 m) above sea level. The state has two distinct natural regions. Eastern Rhode Island contains the lowlands of the Narragansett Bay, while Western Rhode Island forms part of the New England upland. Rhode Island's forests are part of the Northeastern coastal forests ecoregion.

Narragansett Bay is a major feature of the state's topography. There are more than 30 islands within the bay; the largest is Aquidneck Island, which holds the municipalities of Newport, Middletown, and Portsmouth. The second-largest island is Conanicut, and the third is Prudence. Block Island lies about 12 miles (19 km) off the southern coast of the mainland and separates Block Island Sound and the Atlantic Ocean proper.

A rare type of rock called Cumberlandite can be found in Cumberland (the only place within the United States in which it can be found) and is the state rock. There were initially two known deposits of the mineral, but it is an ore of iron, and one of the deposits was extensively mined for its ferrous content. (Note: A somewhat similar ore has been described in Taberg, Sweden.)

Geography of Rhode Island

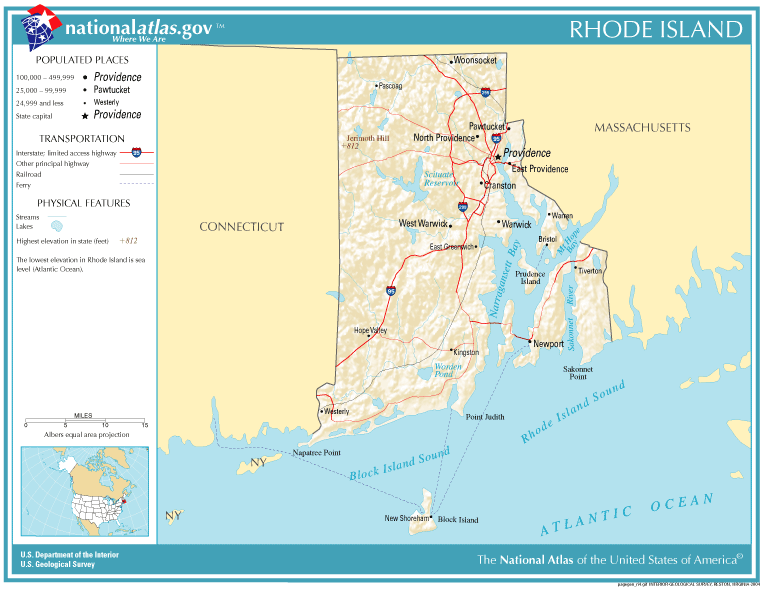
Map of Rhode Island, showing major cities and roads

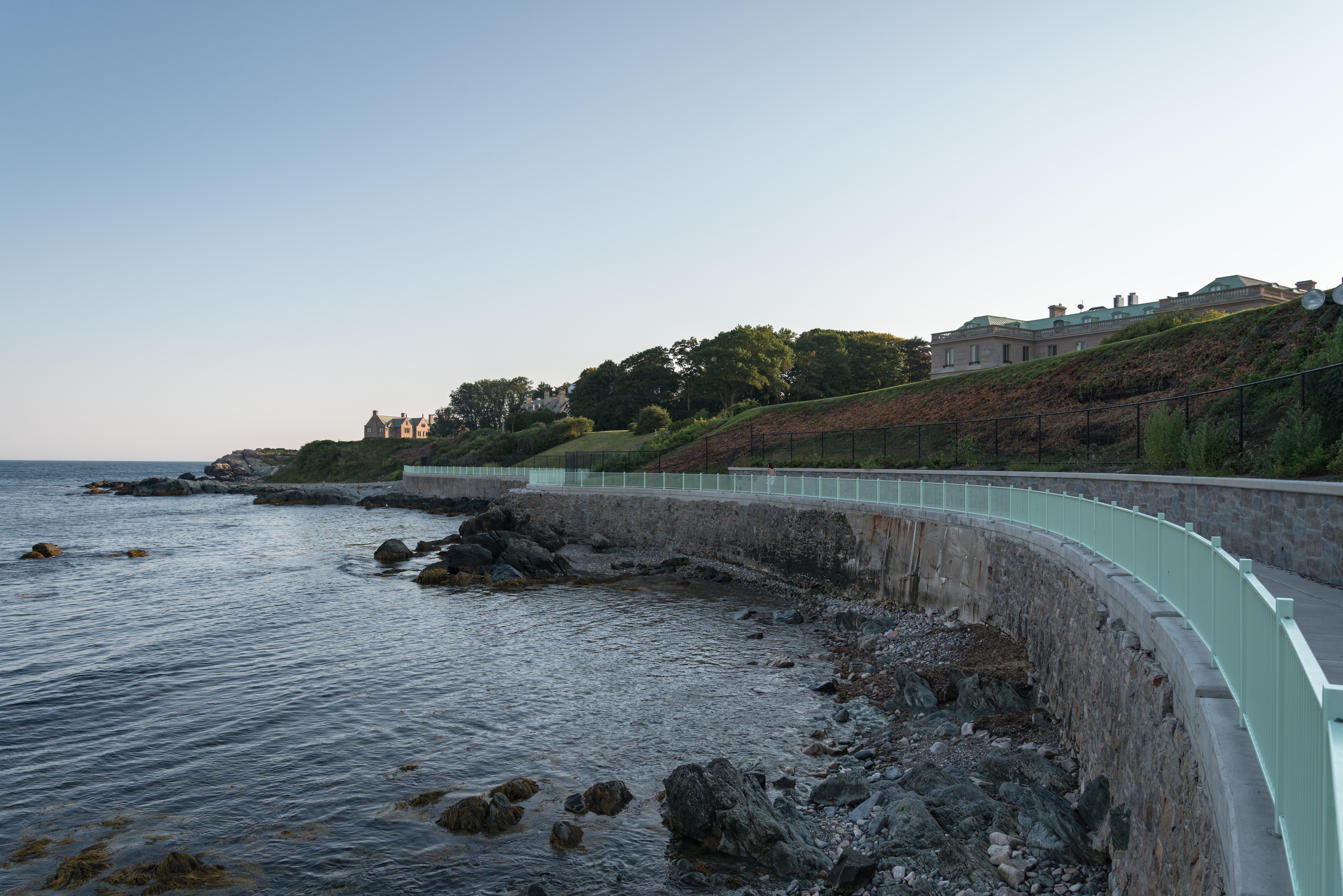
Rocky shoreline in Newport

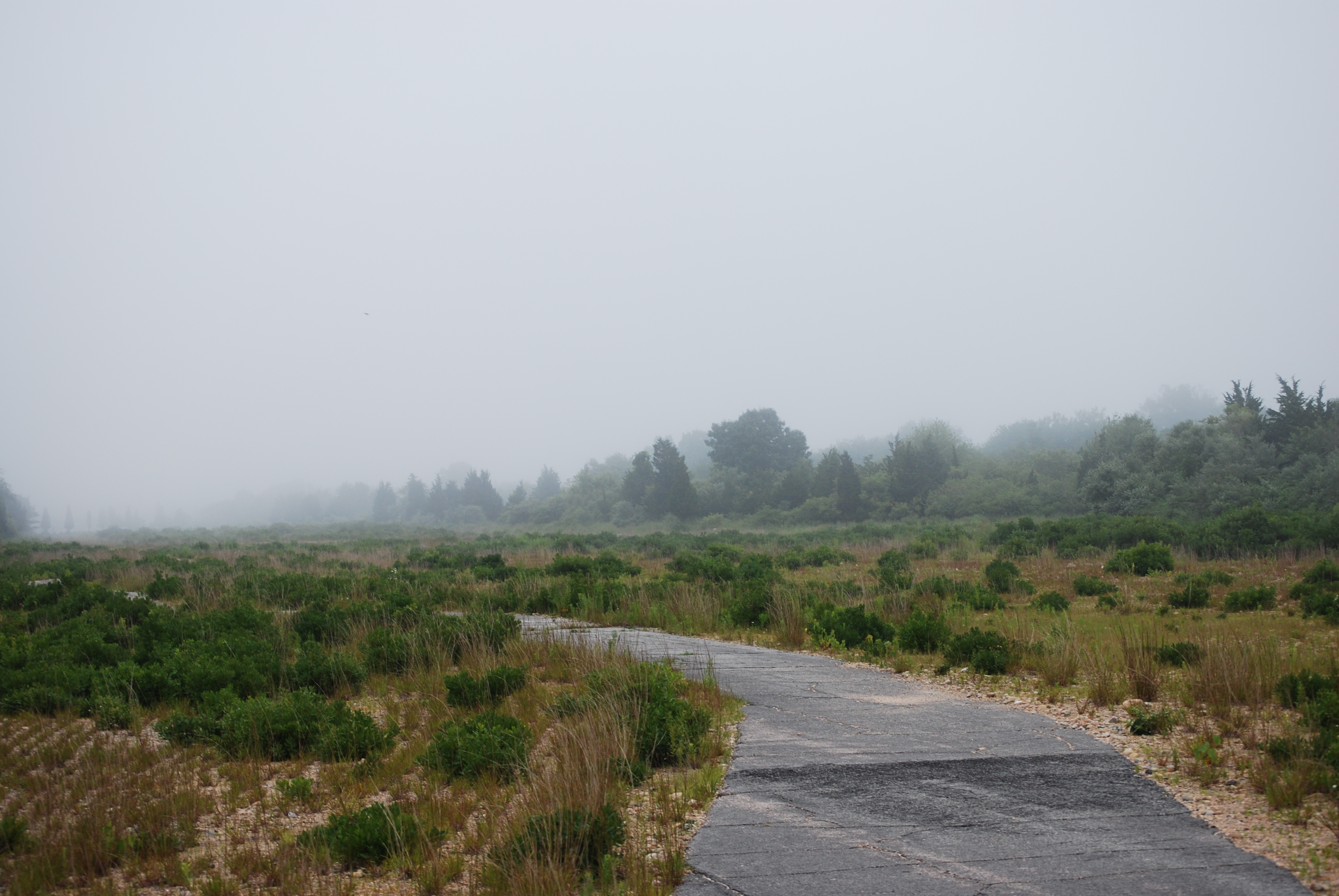
Ninigret Pond National Wildlife Refuge

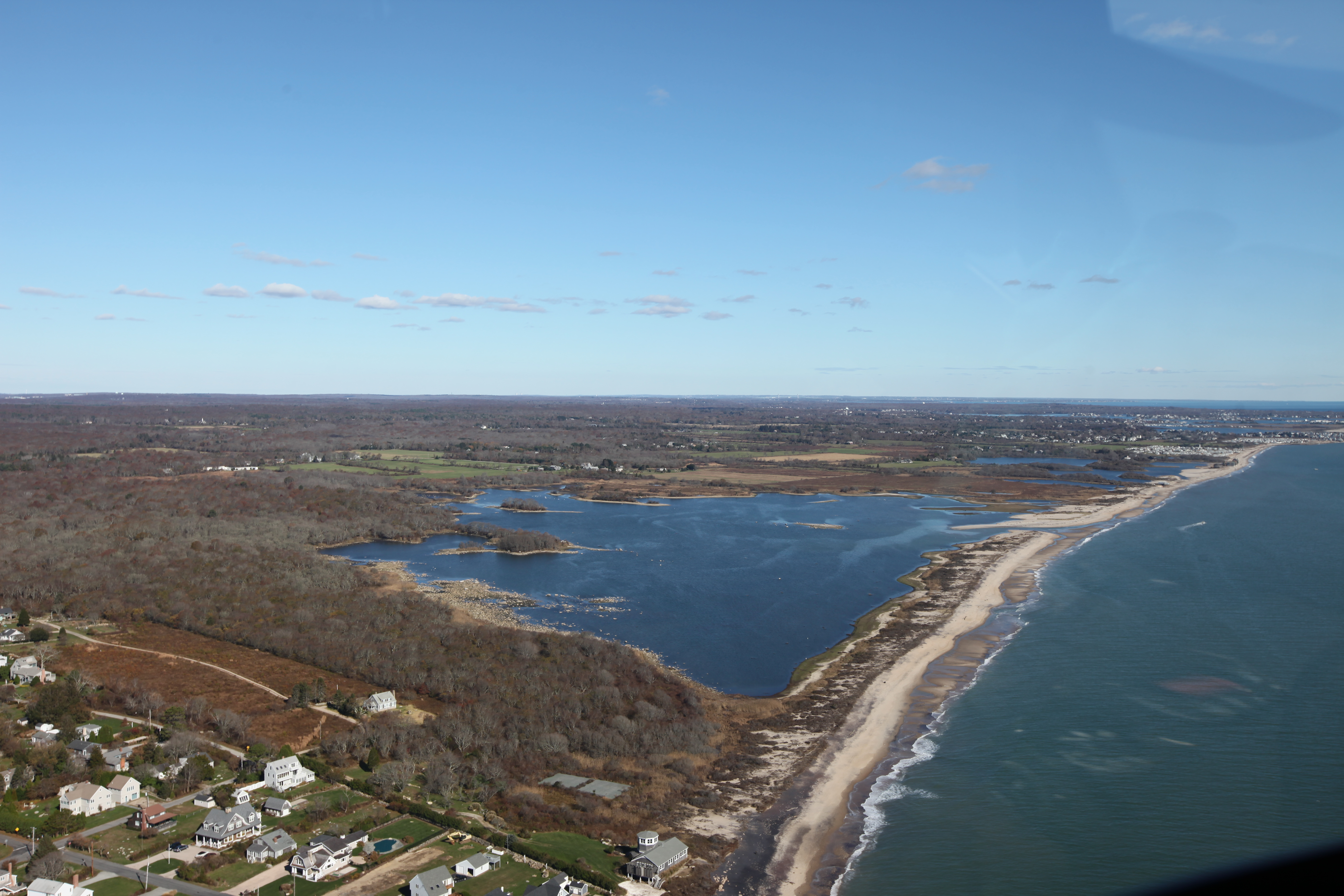
Trustom Pond, a lagoon in South Kingstown

=== Climate ===
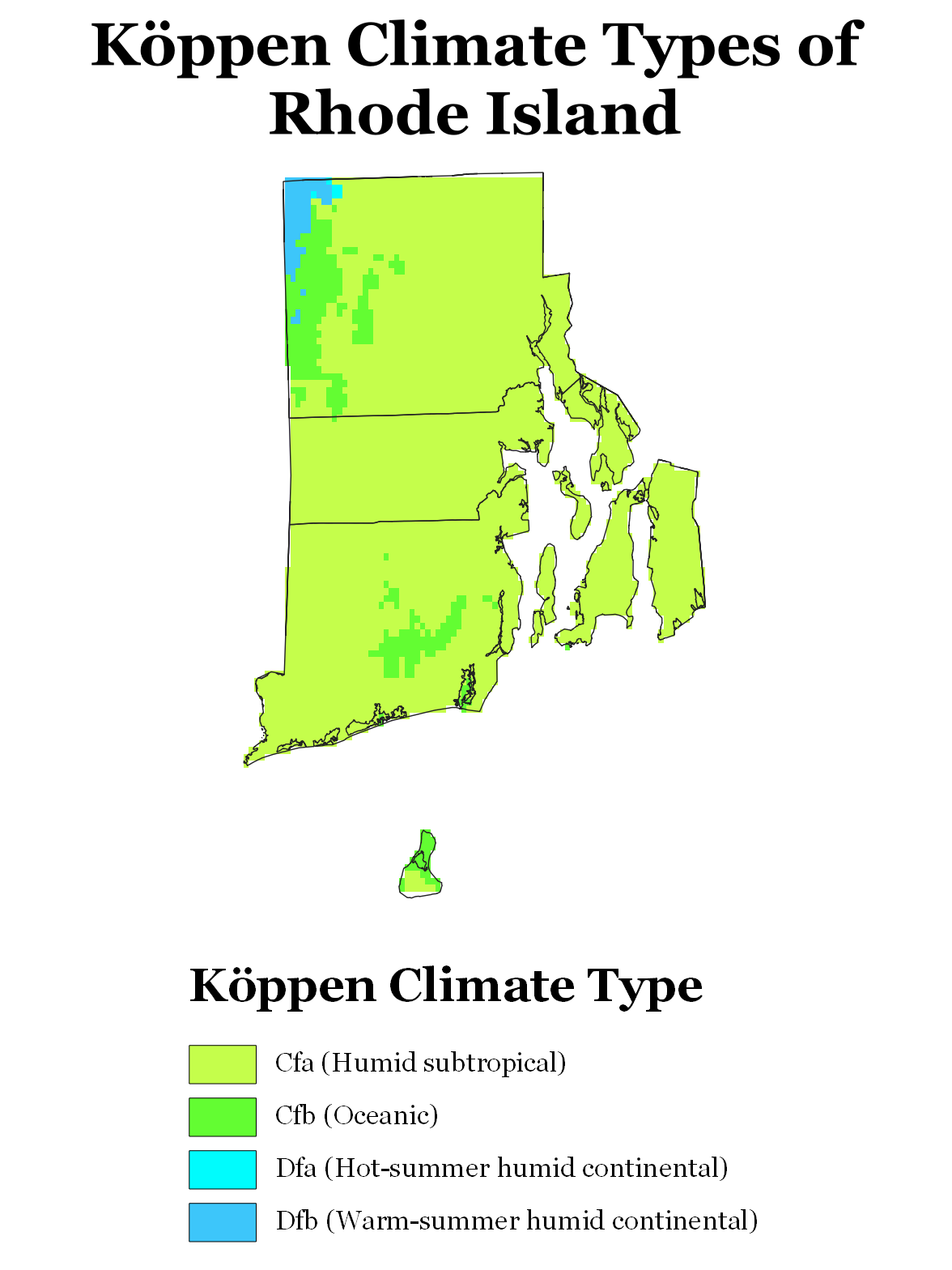
Köppen climate types of Rhode Island, using 1991–2020 climate normals

Rhode Island lies at the broad transition zone from the continental climates to the north and the subtropical climates to the south. The basic climate features warm to hot summers and cool winters with a mix of rain and snow. Block Island has an oceanic climate. The highest temperature recorded in Rhode Island was 104 °F (40 °C), recorded on August 2, 1975, in Providence. The lowest recorded temperature in Rhode Island was −23 °F (−31 °C) on February 5, 1996, in Greene. Monthly average temperatures range from a high of 83 °F (28 °C) to a low of 20 °F (−7 °C).

Rhode Island is vulnerable to tropical storms and hurricanes due to its location along the East Coast. Hurricanes that have done significant damage in the state include the 1938 New England hurricane, Hurricane Carol (1954), Hurricane Donna (1960), and Hurricane Bob (1991).

Due to the relatively flat nature of Rhode Island's seashore, the state is vulnerable to storm surge and coastal erosion, especially as sea levels rise.

=== Cities and towns ===
Rhode Island is divided into five counties but it has no county governments. The entire state is divided into 39 municipalities, which handle all local government affairs.

There are 8 cities and 31 towns in Rhode Island. Major population centers today result from historical factors; development took place predominantly along the Blackstone, Seekonk, and Providence Rivers with the advent of the water-powered mill. Providence is the base of a large metropolitan area.

The state's 19 largest municipalities ranked by population are:

1. Providence (190,934)
2. Cranston (82,934)
3. Warwick (82,823)
4. Pawtucket (75,604)
5. East Providence (47,139)
6. Woonsocket (43,240)
7. Cumberland (36,405)
8. Coventry (35,688)
9. North Providence (34,114)
10. South Kingstown (31,931)
11. West Warwick (31,012)
12. Johnston (29,568)
13. North Kingstown (27,732)
14. Newport (25,163)
15. Westerly (23,359)
16. Central Falls (22,583)
17. Lincoln (22,529)
18. Bristol (22,493)
19. Smithfield (22,118)

Some of Rhode Island's cities and towns are further partitioned into villages, in common with many other New England states. Notable villages include Kingston in the town of South Kingstown, which houses the University of Rhode Island; Wickford in the town of North Kingstown, the site of an annual international art festival; and Wakefield where the Town Hall is for the Town of South Kingstown.

Major cities of Rhode Island

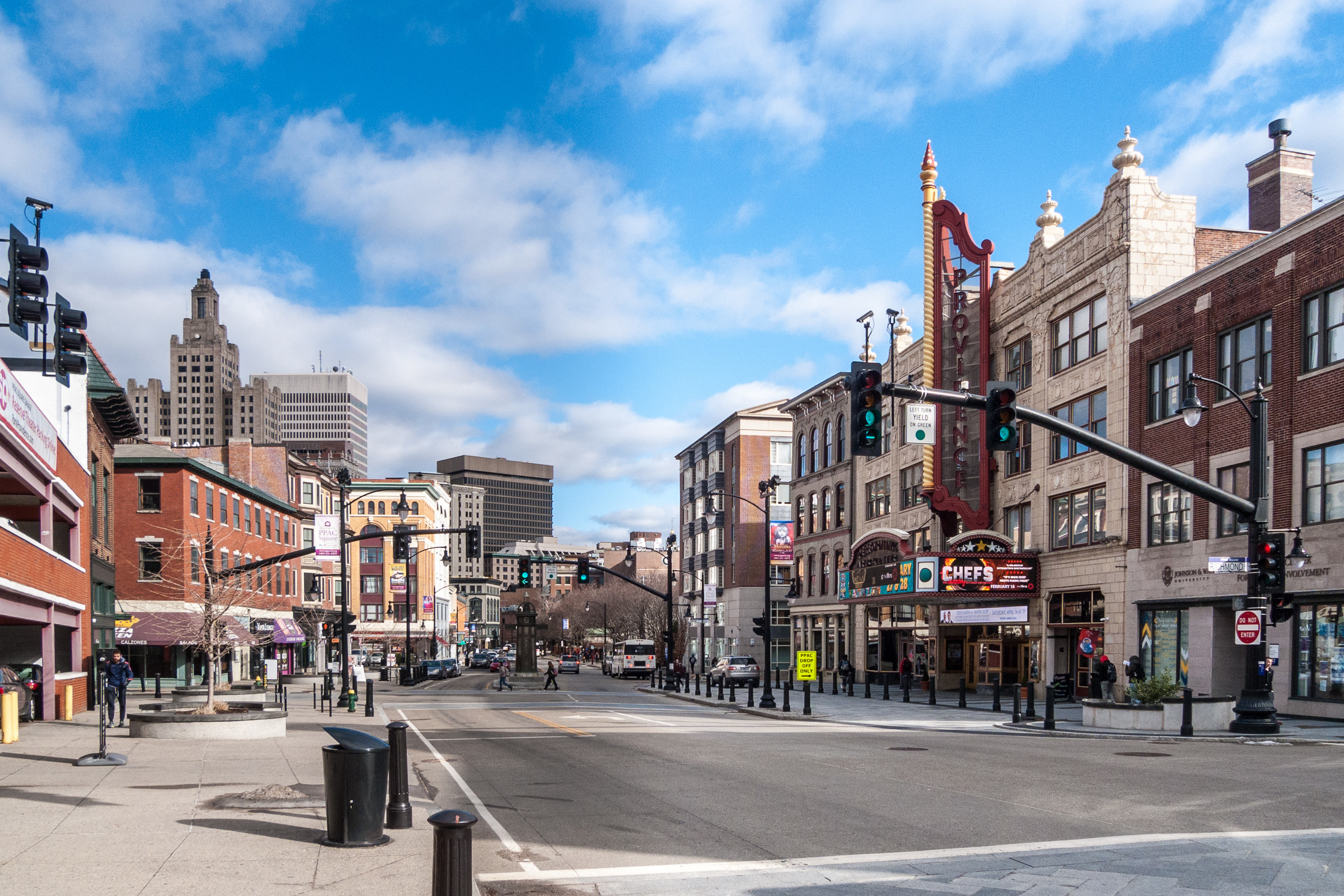
1. Providence

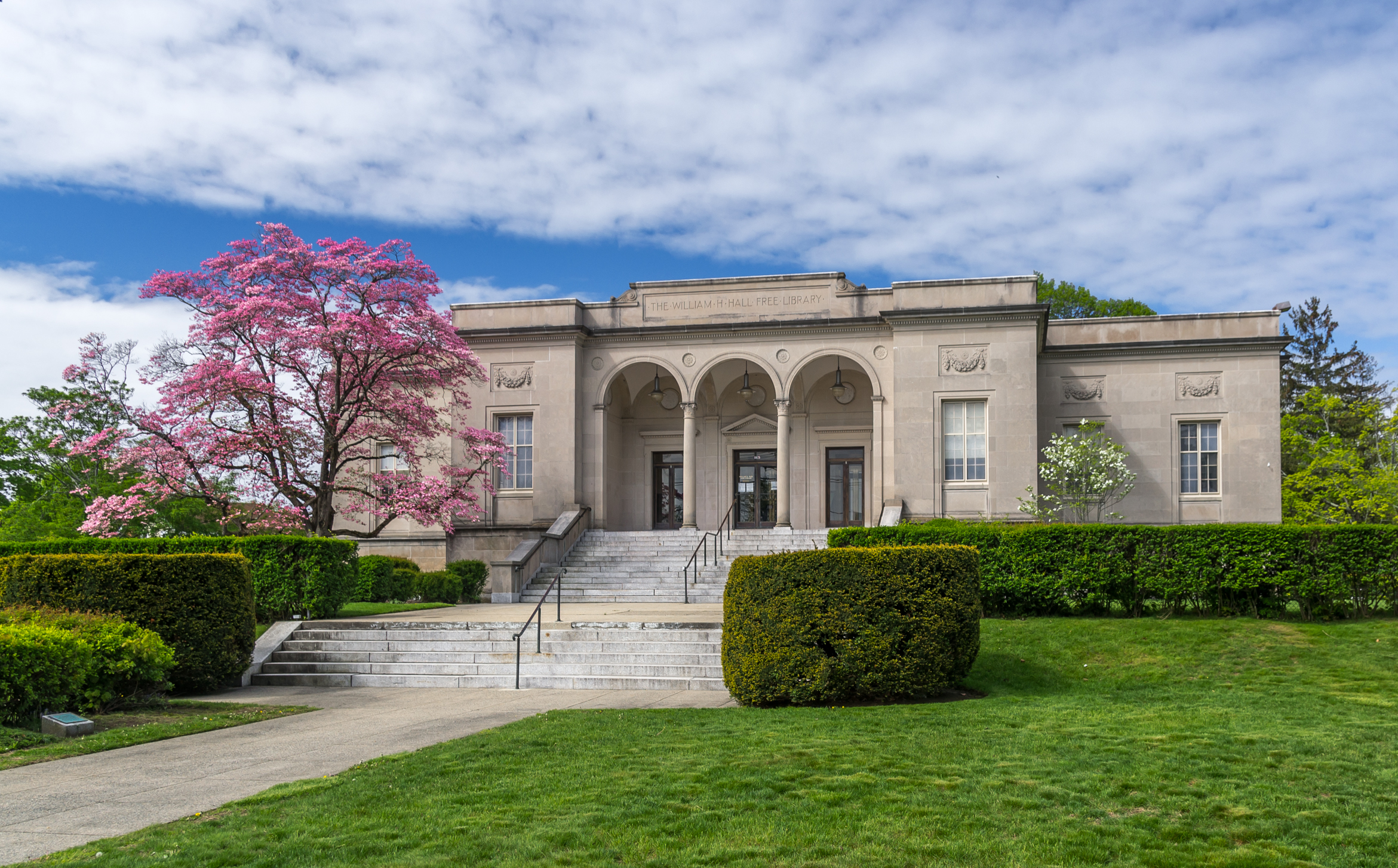
2. Cranston

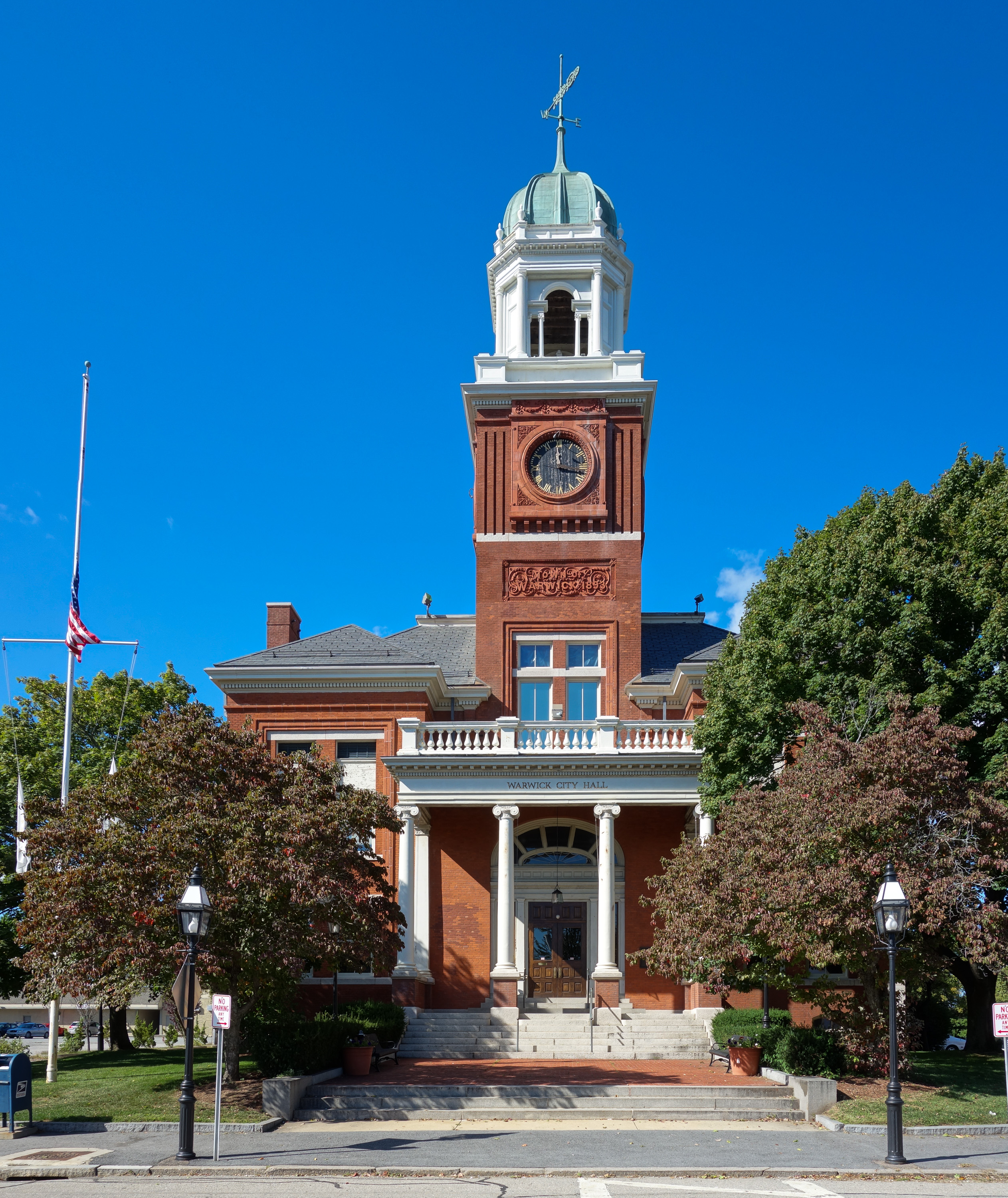
3. Warwick

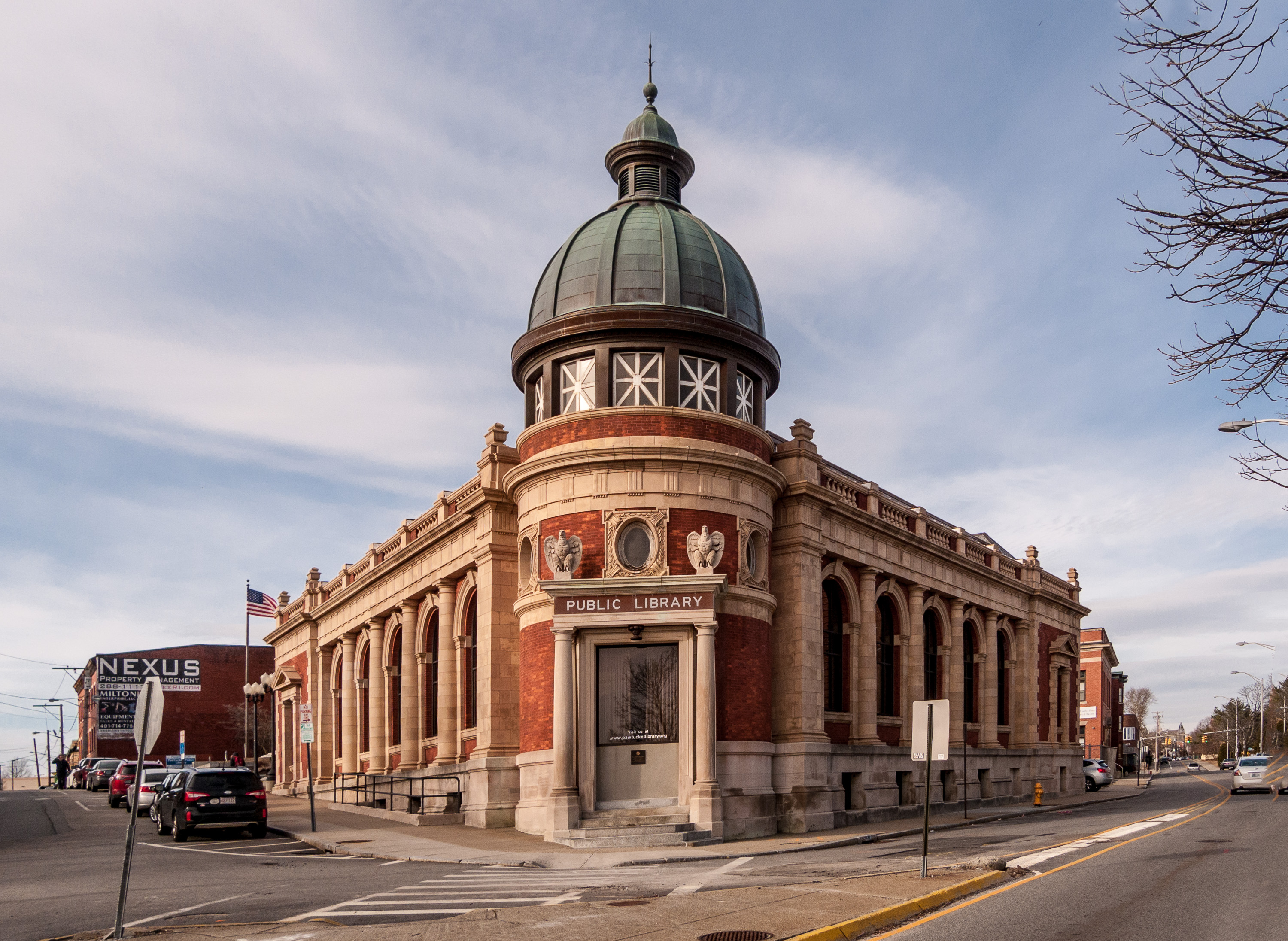
4. Pawtucket

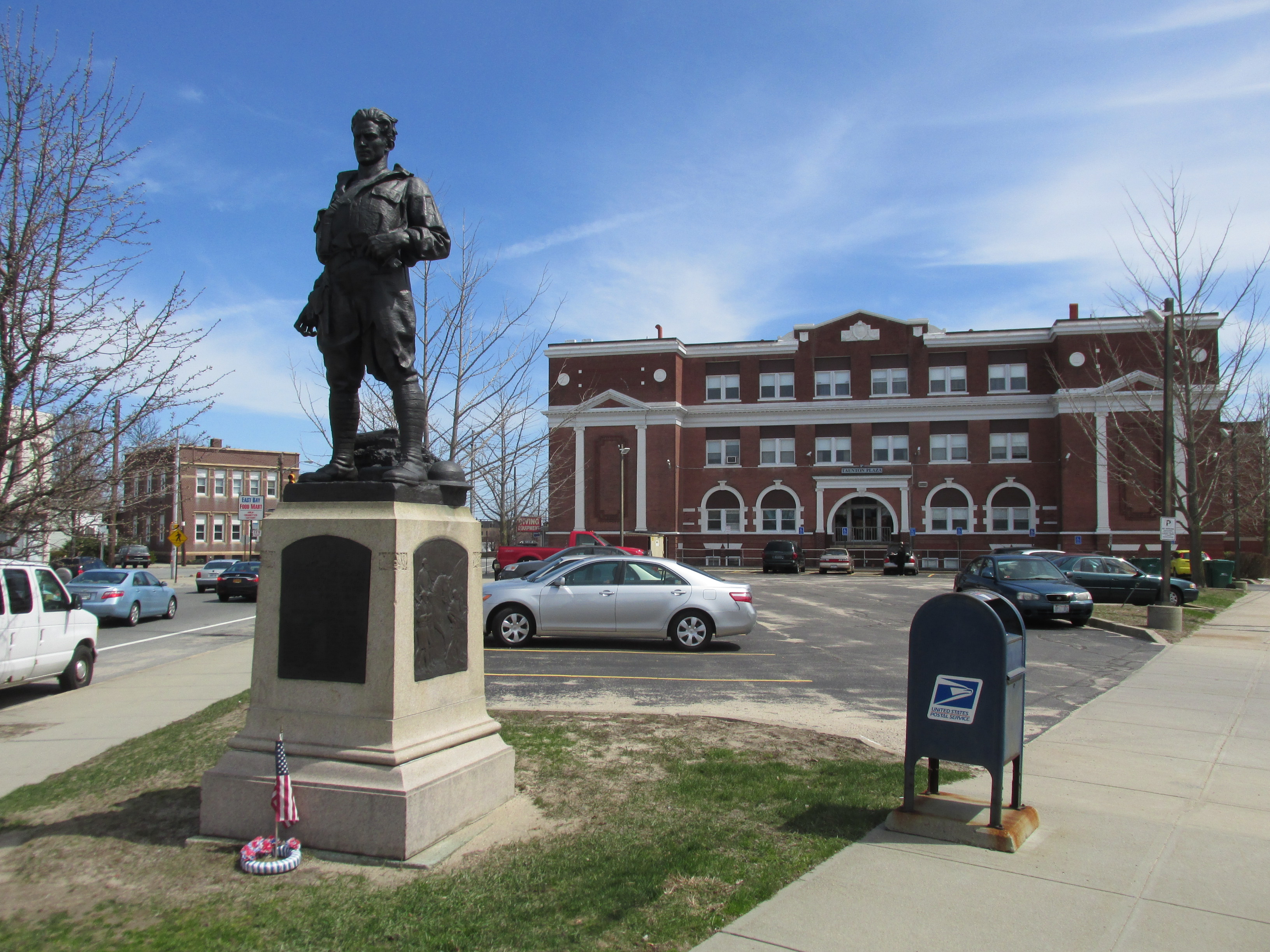
5. East Providence

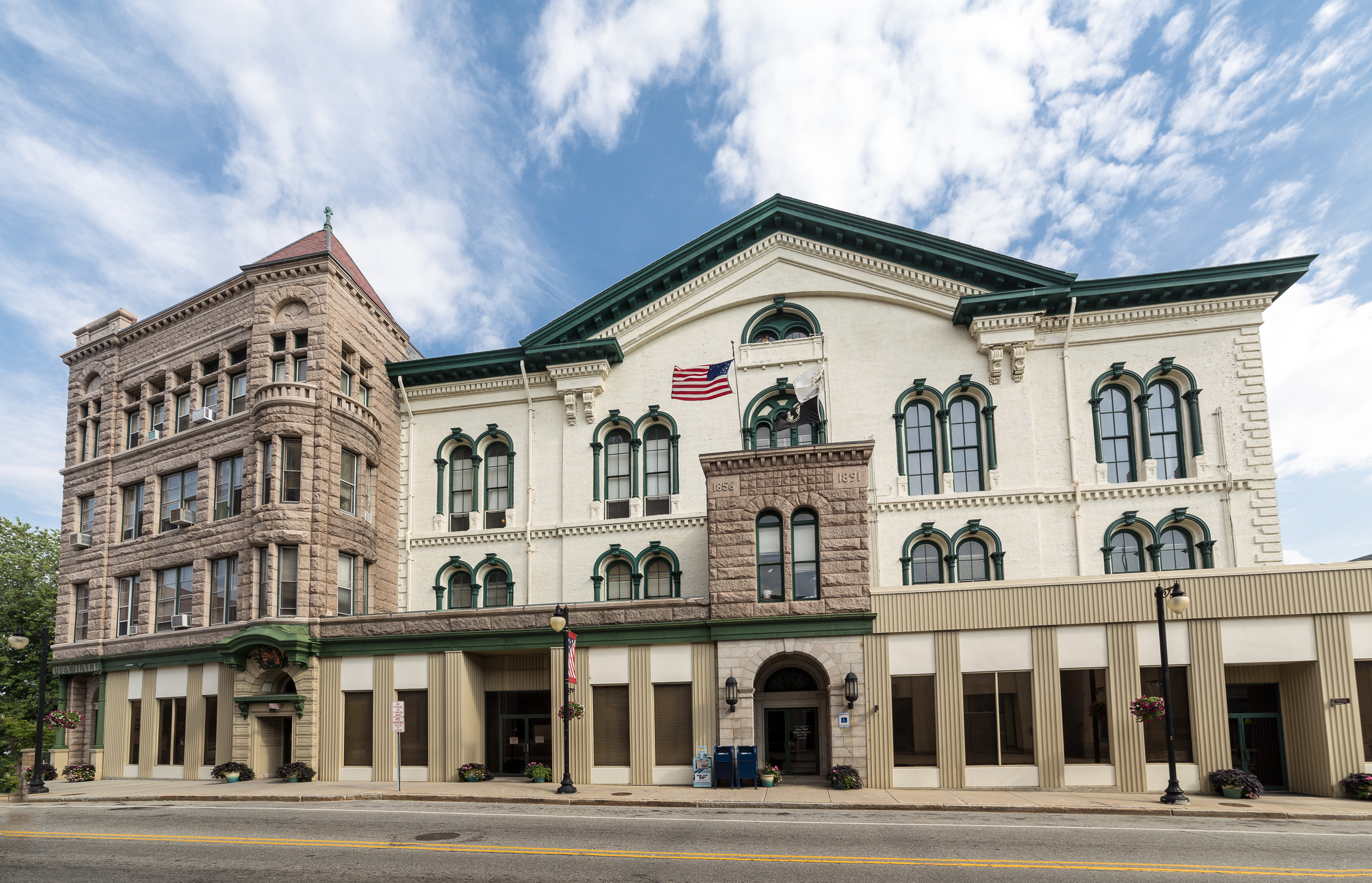
6. Woonsocket

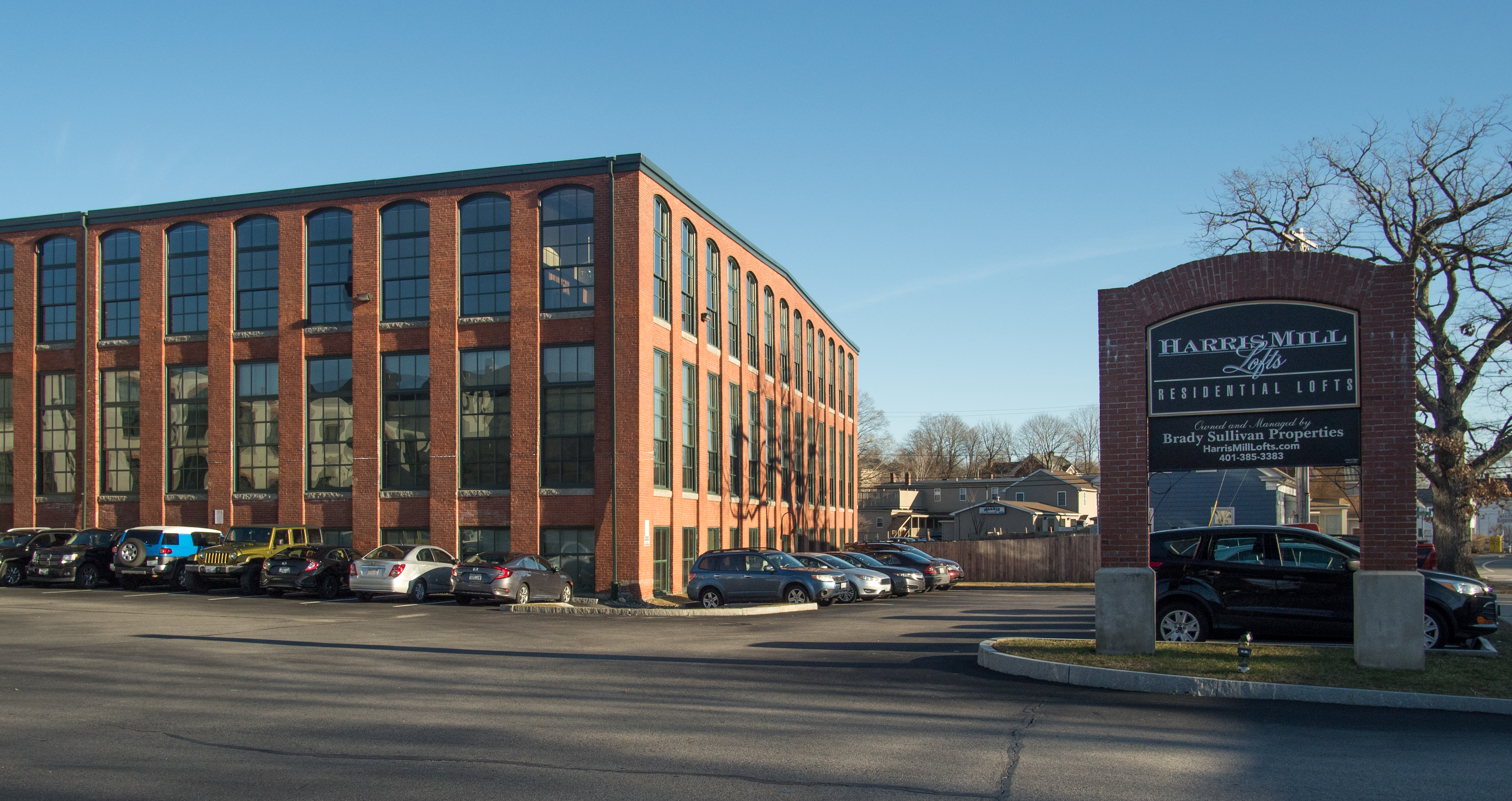
7. Coventry

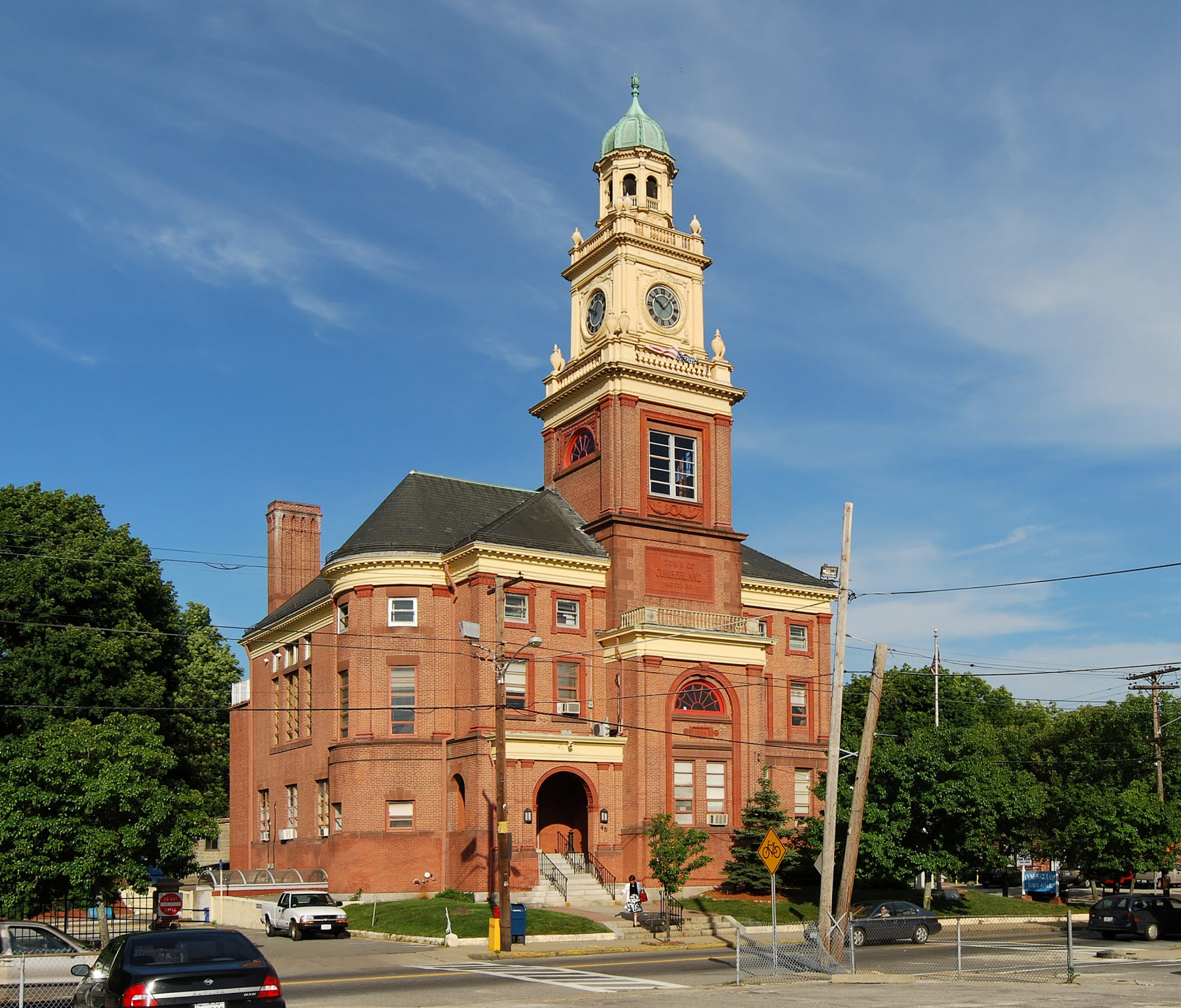
8. Cumberland

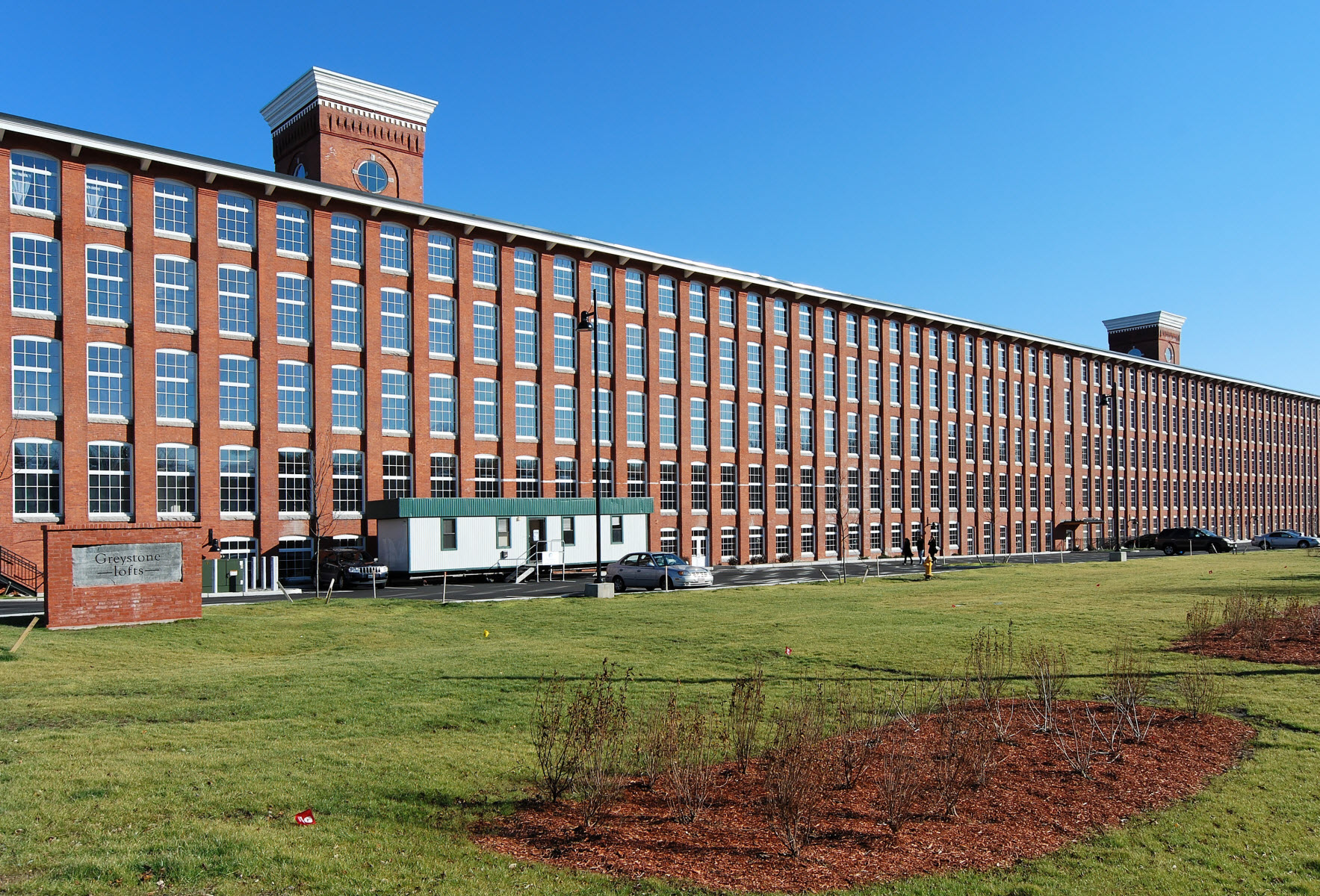
9. North Providence

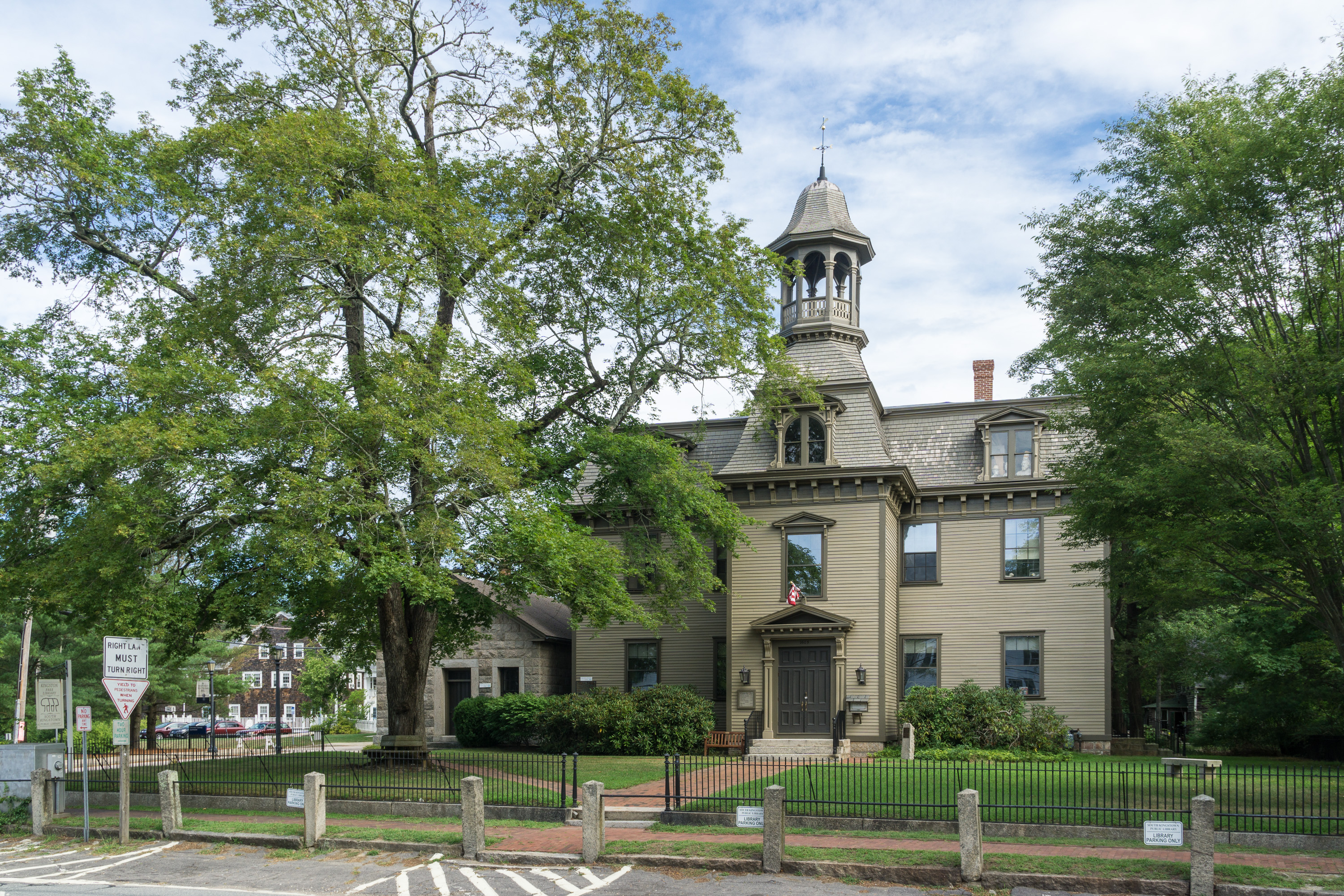
10. South Kingstown

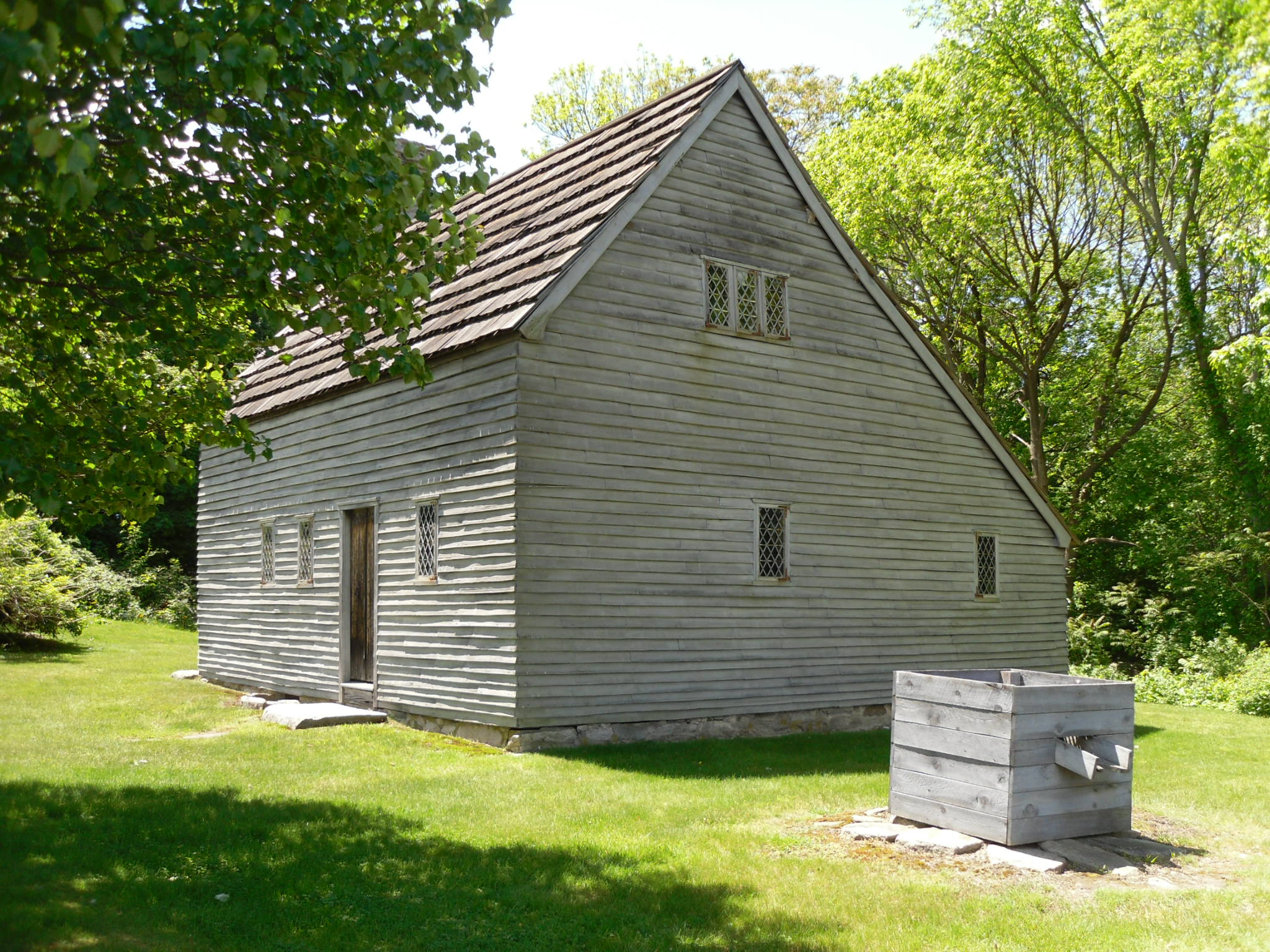
11. Johnston

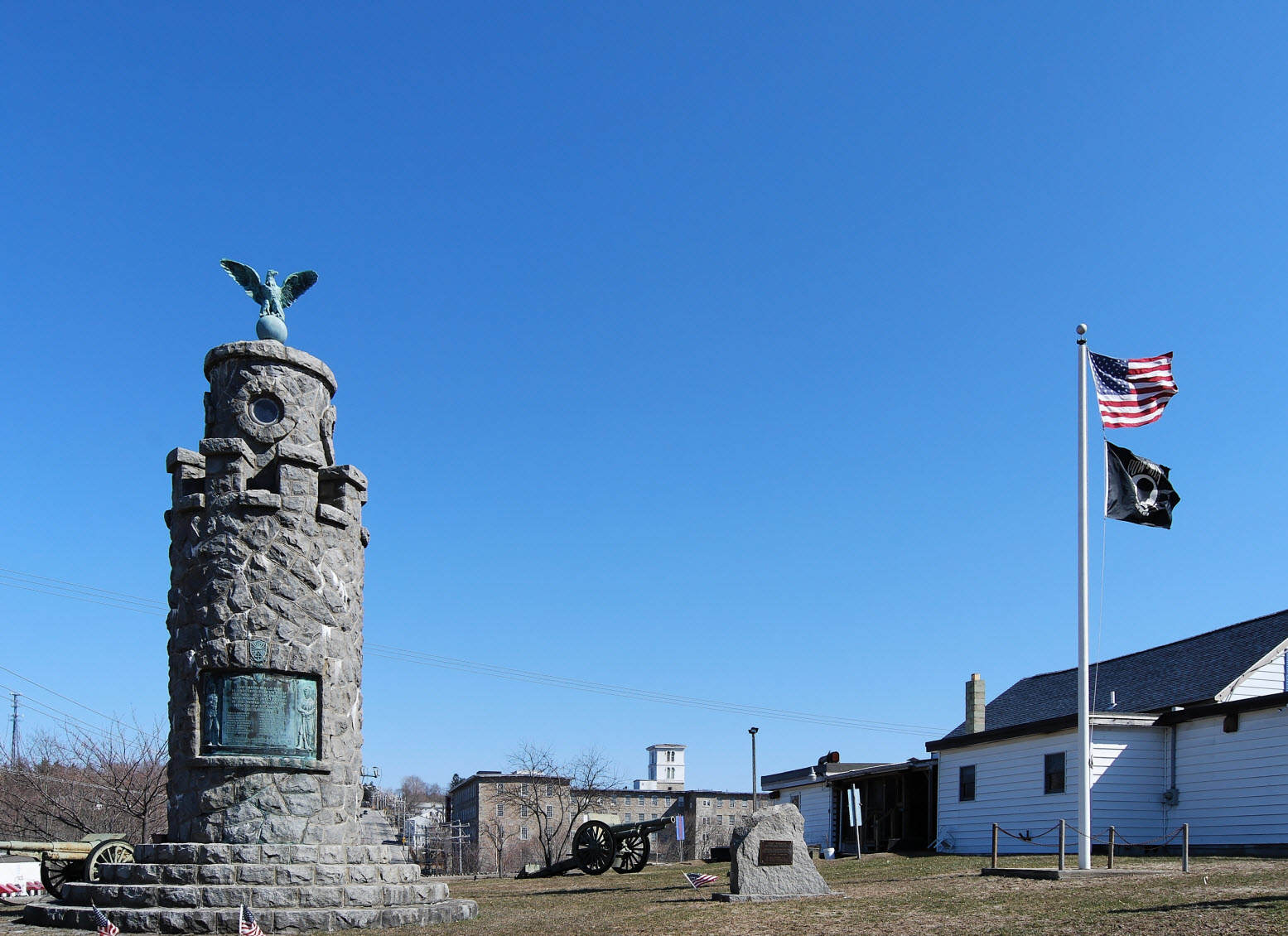
12. West Warwick

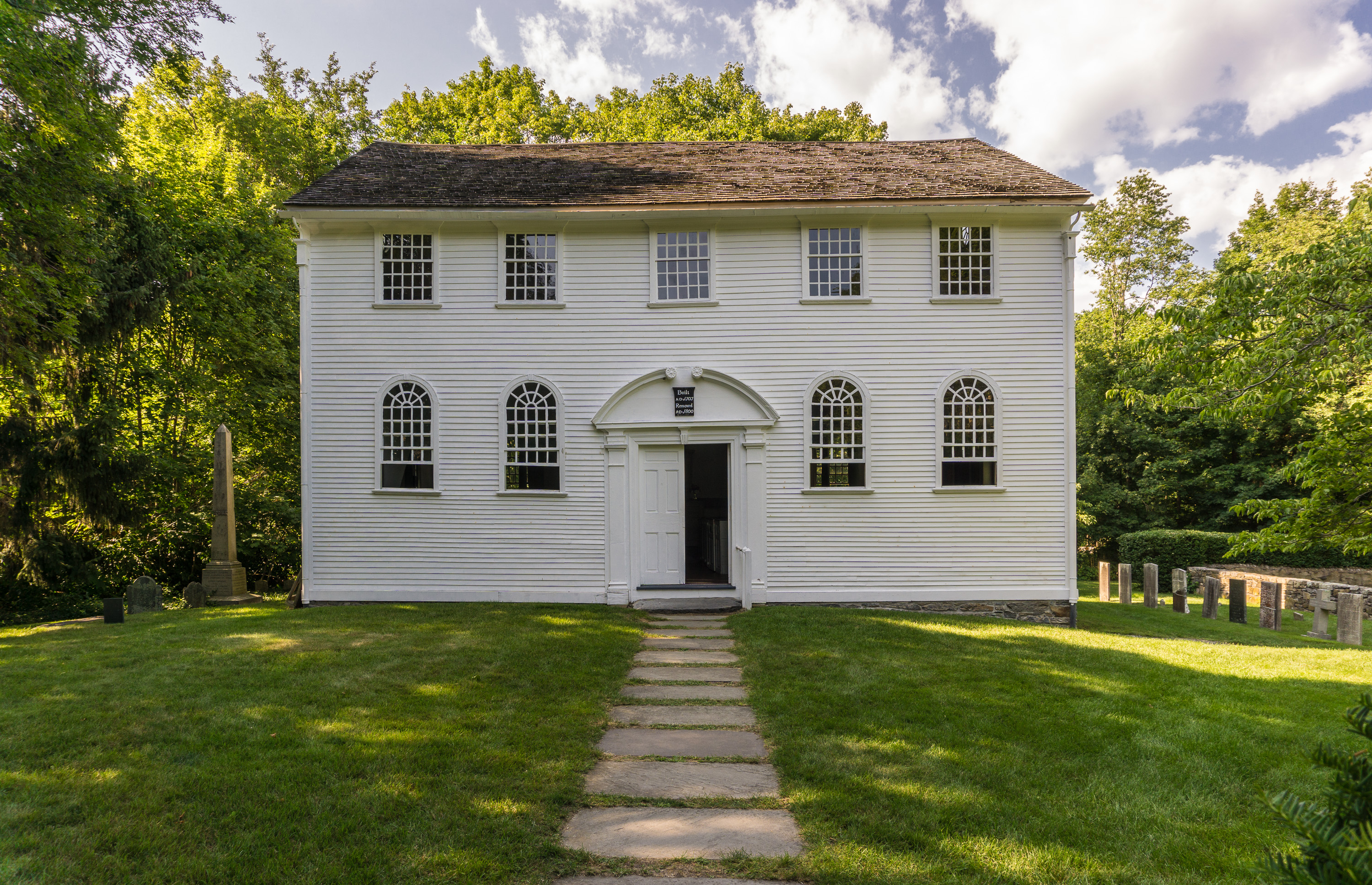
13. North Kingstown

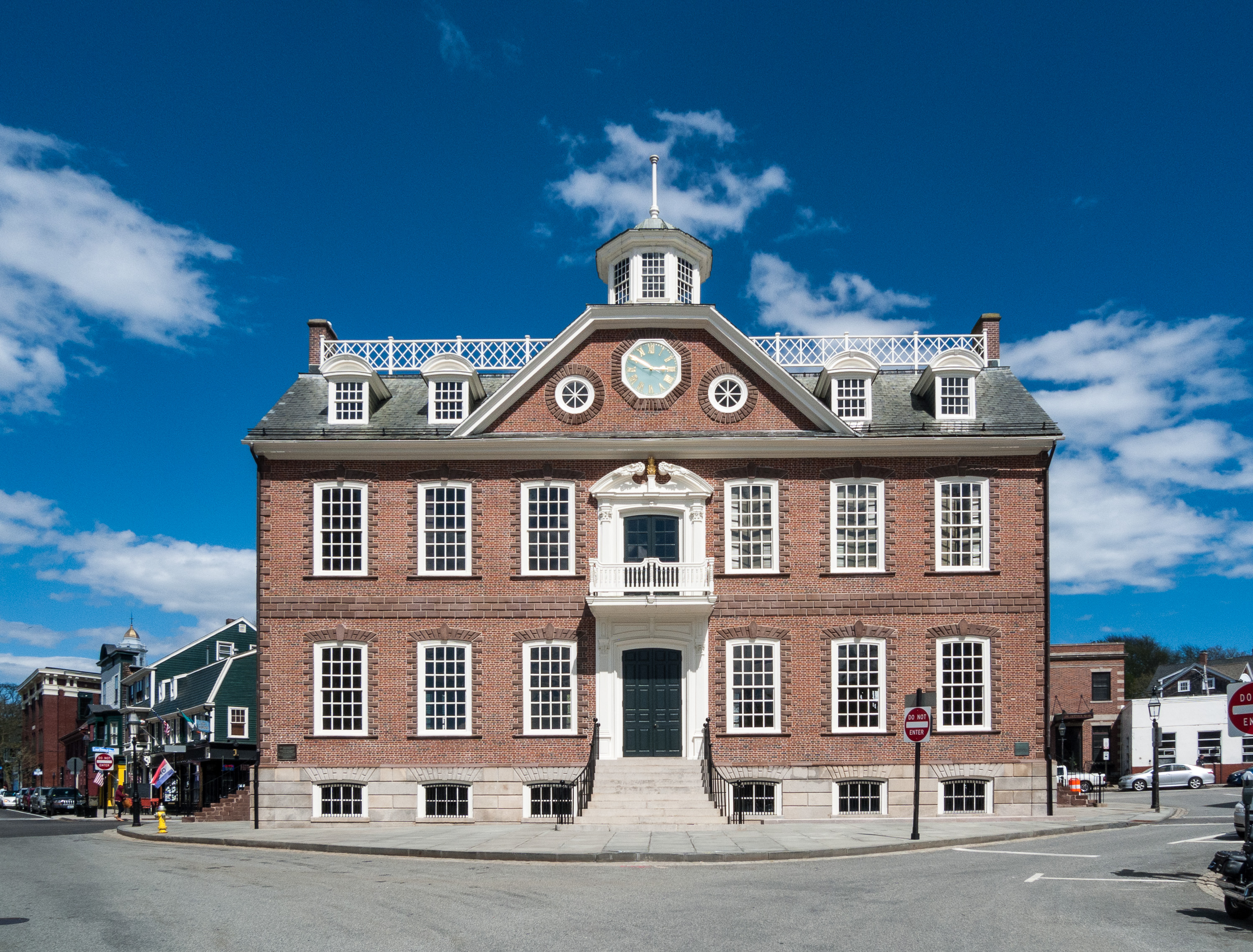
14. Newport

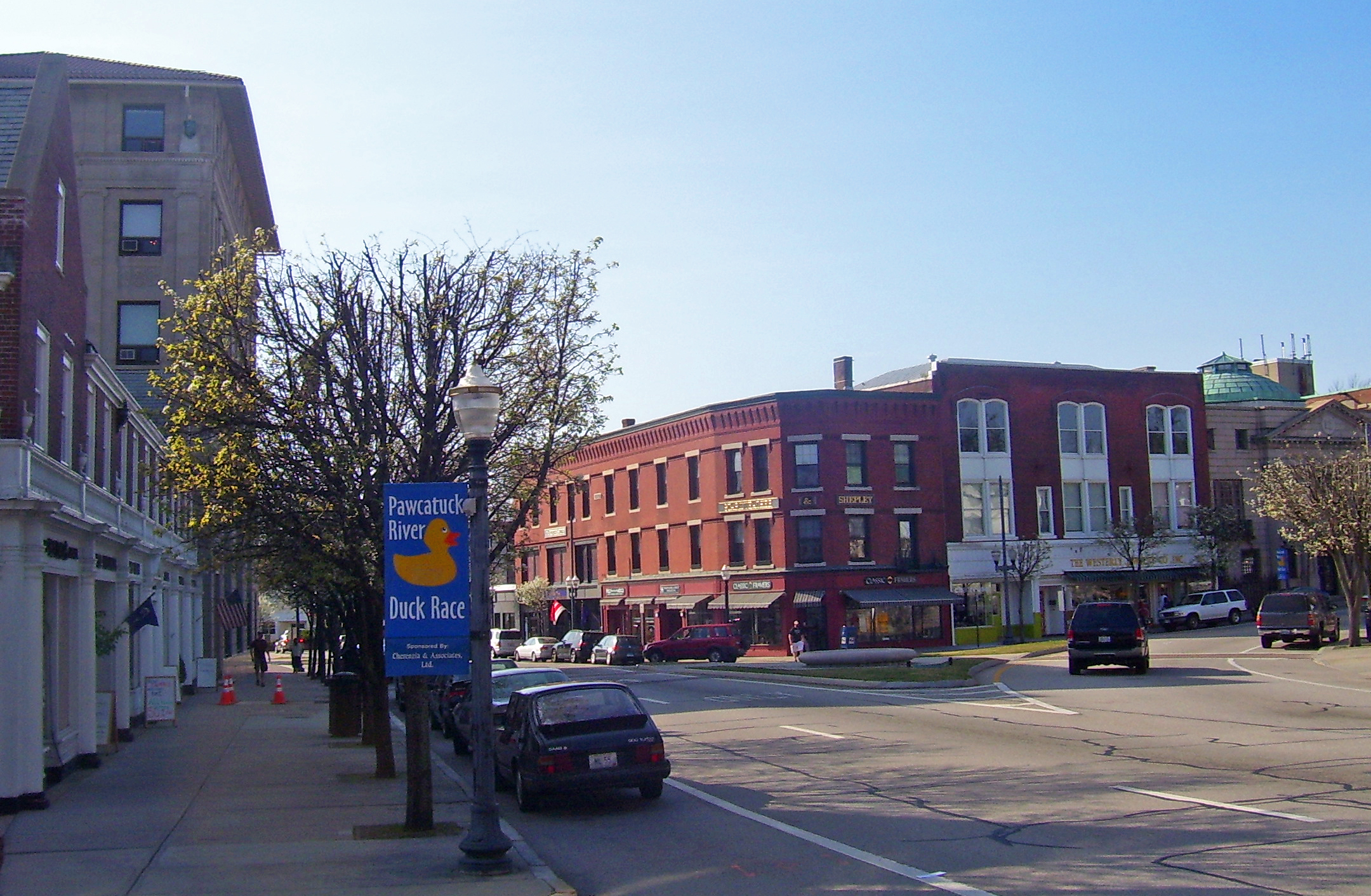
15. Westerly

== Landmarks ==
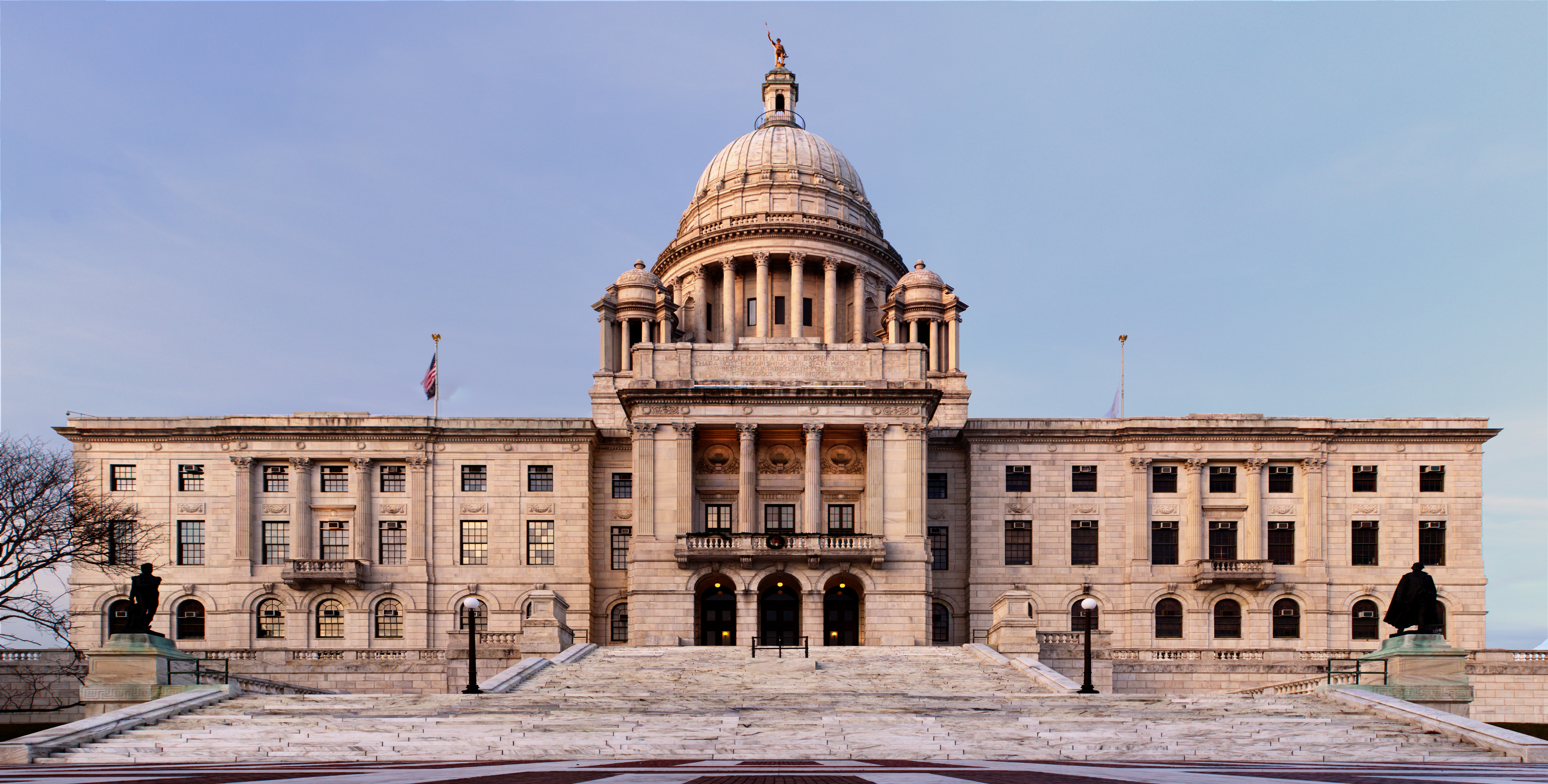
The Rhode Island State House in Providence boasts the world's fourth largest self-supported marble dome.

The state capitol building is made of white Georgian marble. On top is the world's fourth largest self-supported marble dome. It houses the Rhode Island Charter granted by King Charles II in 1663, the Brown University charter, and other state treasures.

The First Baptist Church of Providence is the oldest Baptist church in the Americas, founded by Roger Williams in 1638.

The first fully automated post office in the country is in Providence. There are many historic mansions in the seaside city of Newport, including The Breakers, Marble House, and Belcourt Castle. Also there is the Touro Synagogue, dedicated on December 2, 1763, considered by locals to be the first synagogue within the United States (see below for information on New York City's claim), and still serving. The synagogue showcases the religious freedoms established by Roger Williams, as well as impressive architecture in a mix of the classic colonial and Sephardic style. The Newport Casino is a National Historic Landmark building complex that houses the International Tennis Hall of Fame and features an active grass-court tennis club.

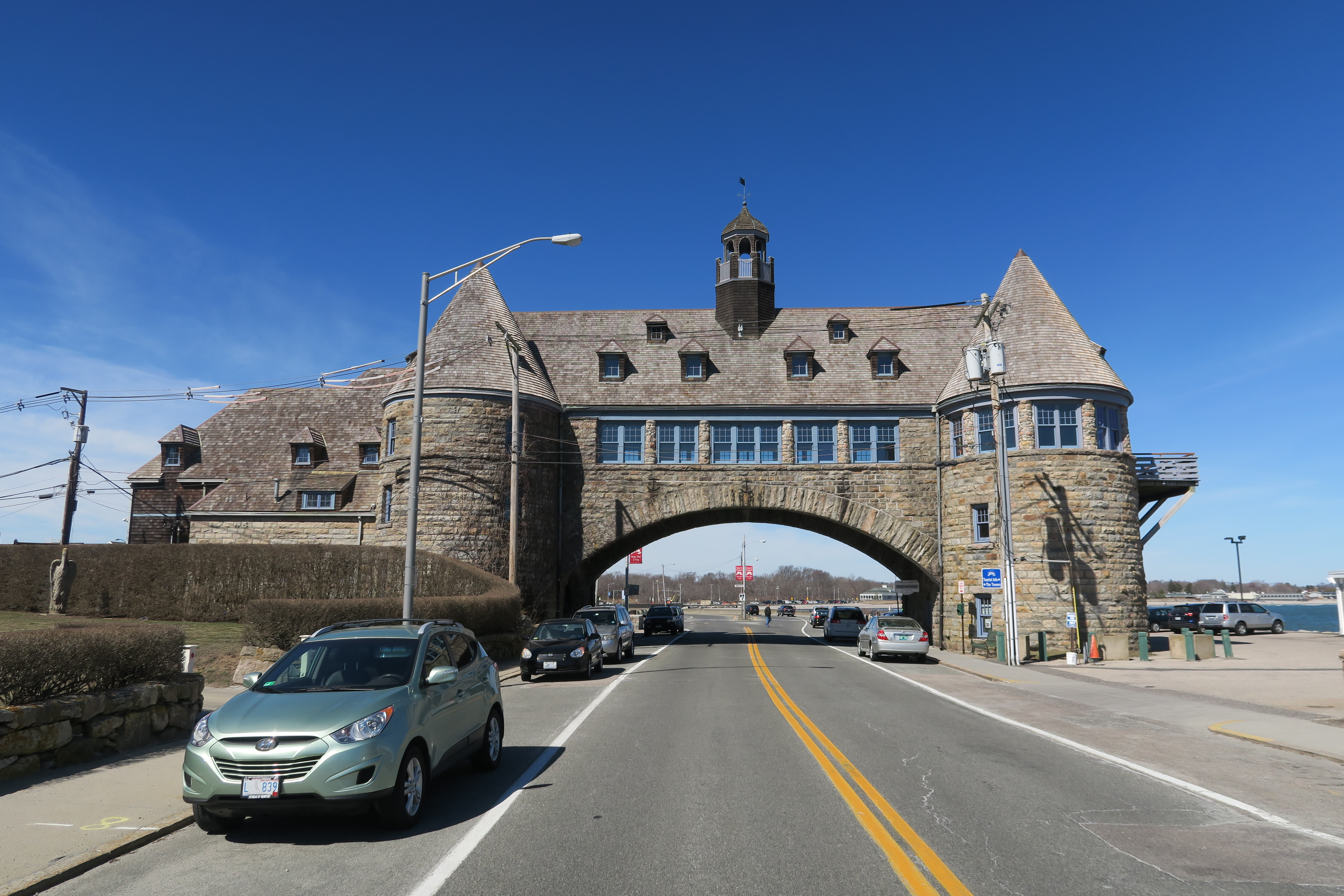
The Towers are a Narragansett landmark.

Scenic Route 1A (known locally as Ocean Road) is in Narragansett. "The Towers" is also in Narragansett featuring a large stone arch. It was once the entrance to a famous Narragansett casino that burned down in 1900. The Towers now serve as an event venue and host the local Chamber of Commerce, which operates a tourist information center.

The Newport Tower has been hypothesized to be of Viking origin, although most experts believe it was a Colonial-era windmill.

== Environment ==
=== Environmental legislation ===
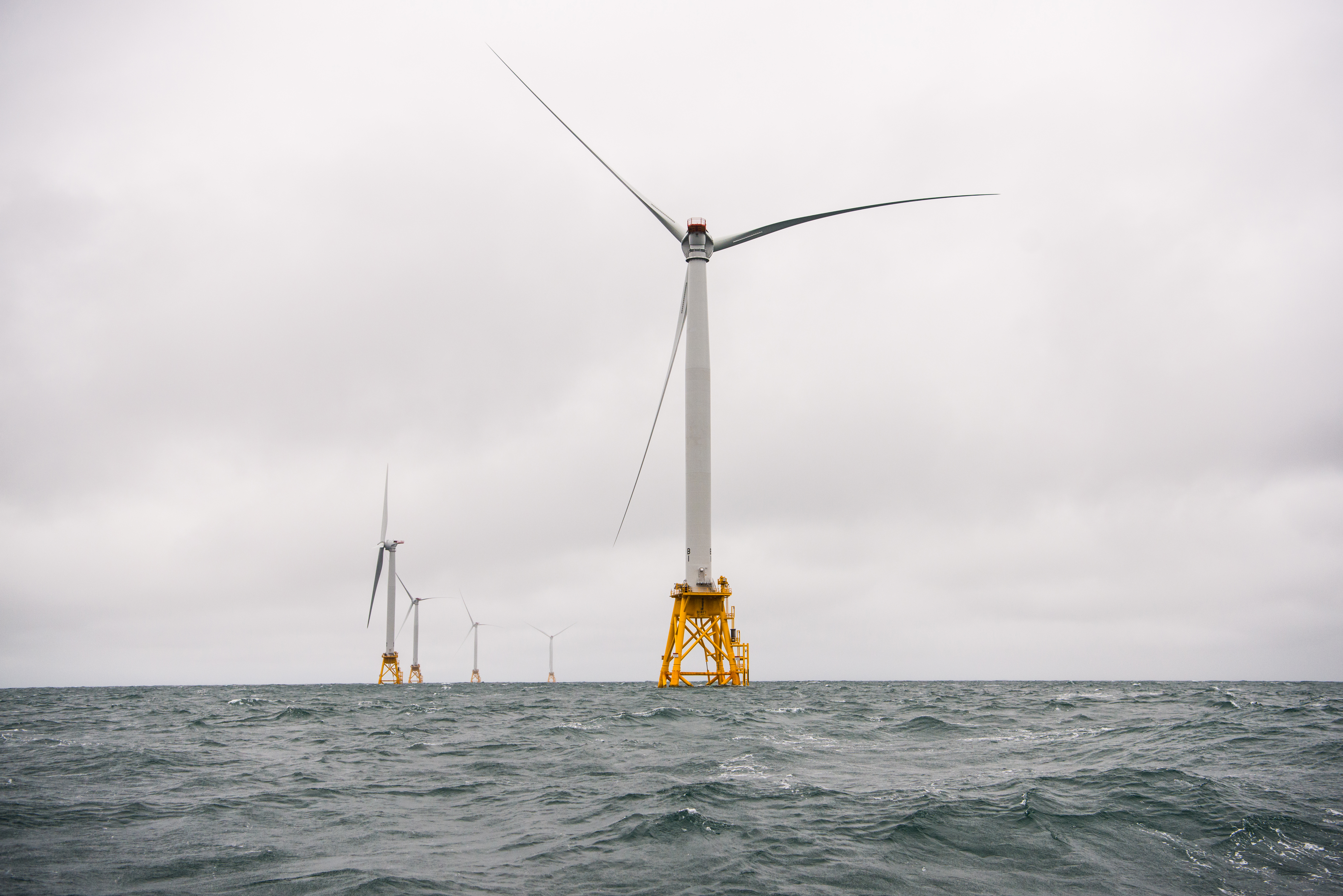
The Block Island Wind Farm is the first commercial offshore wind farm in the United States.

On May 29, 2014, Governor Lincoln D. Chafee announced that Rhode Island was one of eight states to release a collaborative Action Plan to put 3.3 million zero-emission vehicles on its roads by 2025. The plan's purpose is to reduce greenhouse gas and smog-causing emissions. The plan promotes zero-emissions vehicles and investments in the infrastructure to support them.

In 2014, Rhode Island received grants of $2,711,685 from the Environmental Protection Agency to clean up Brownfield sites in eight locations. The grants provided communities with funding to assess, clean up, and redevelop contaminated properties, boost local economies, and leverage jobs while protecting public health and the environment.

In 2013, the "Lots of Hope" program was established in the City of Providence to focus on increasing the city's green space and local food production, improve urban neighborhoods, promote healthy lifestyles and improve environmental sustainability. Supported by a $100,000 grant, the program will partner with the City of Providence, the Southside Community Land Trust, and the Rhode Island Foundation to convert city-owned vacant lots into productive urban farms.

In 2012, Rhode Island passed bill S2277/H7412, "An act relating to Health and Safety – Environmental Cleanup Objectives for Schools", informally known as the School Siting Bill. Sponsored by Senator Juan Pichardo and Representative Scott Slater, and signed into law by the governor, it made Rhode Island the first US State to prohibit school construction on Brownfield sites where toxic vapors can potentially affect indoor air quality. It also creates a public participation process whenever a city or town considers building a school on any other kind of contaminated site.

On April 14, 2021, the 2021 Act on Climate was signed. It specified a set of increasingly stringent emissions mandates for the state for the first year of every decade from 2020 until 2050, with the ultimate goal of the state producing net-zero emissions by 2050.

=== Environmental monitoring ===
The Invasive Plant Atlas of New England monitors invasive weeds throughout New England.

== Demographics ==
Historical population
Census	Pop.	Note	%±
1790	68,825		—
1800	69,122		0.4%
1810	76,931		11.3%
1820	83,059		8.0%
1830	97,199		17.0%
1840	108,830		12.0%
1850	147,545		35.6%
1860	174,620		18.4%
1870	217,353		24.5%
1880	276,531		27.2%
1890	345,506		24.9%
1900	428,556		24.0%
1910	542,610		26.6%
1920	604,397		11.4%
1930	687,497		13.7%
1940	713,346		3.8%
1950	791,896		11.0%
1960	859,488		8.5%
1970	946,725		10.1%
1980	947,154		0.0%
1990	1,003,464		5.9%
2000	1,048,319		4.5%
2010	1,052,567		0.4%
2020	1,097,379		4.3%
2025 (est.)	1,114,521		1.6%
Source: 1910–2020

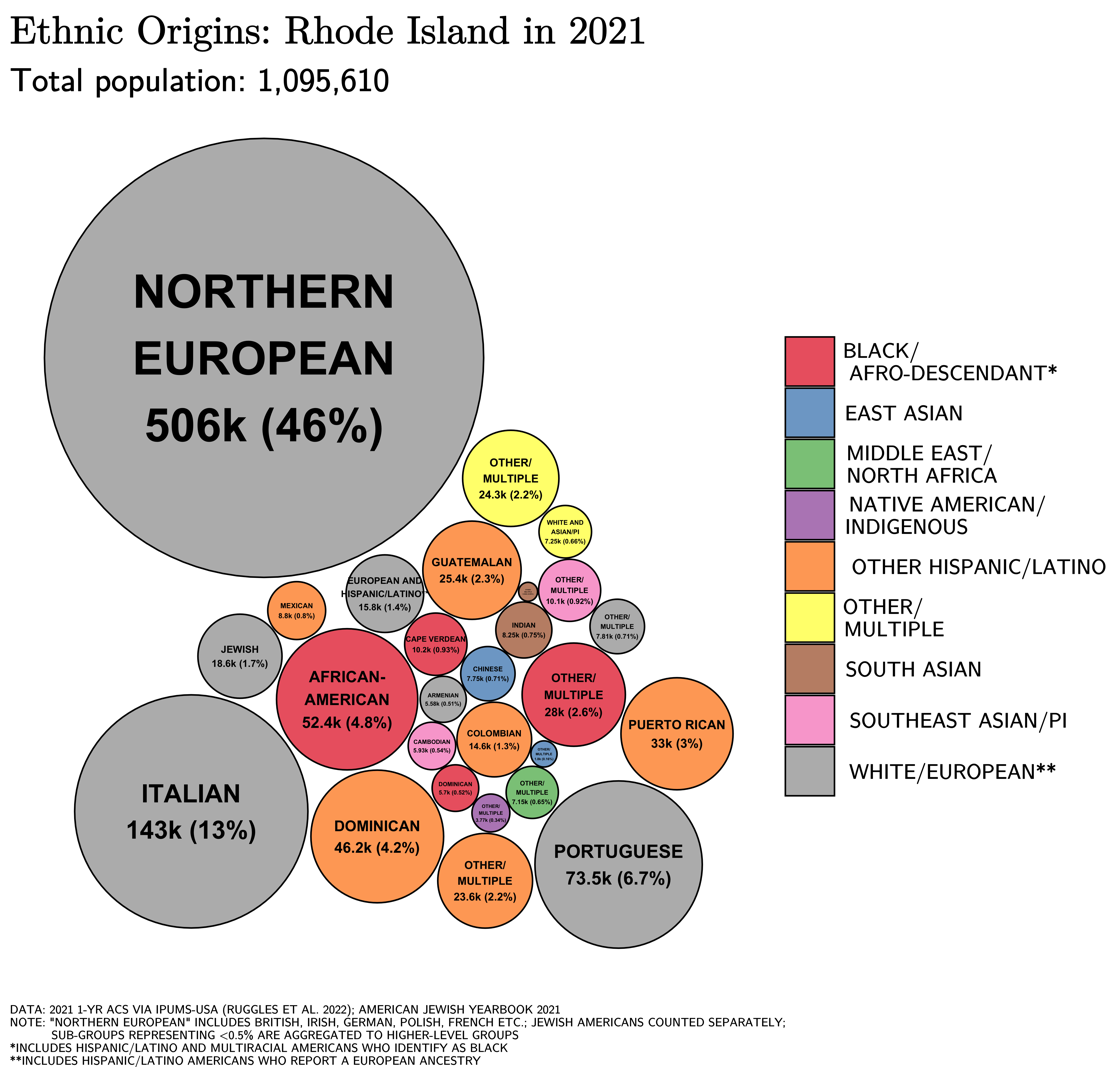
Ethnic origins in Rhode Island

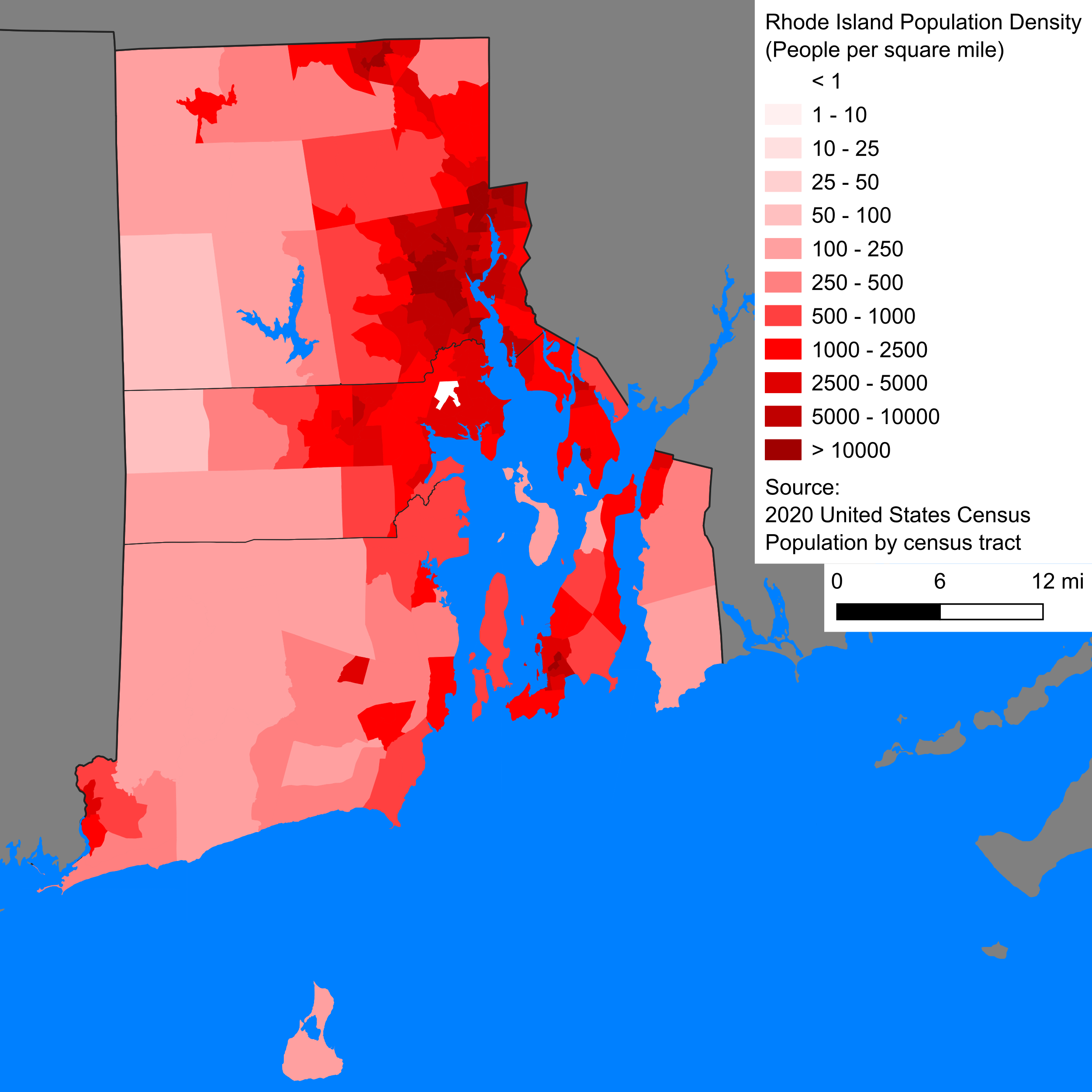
Rhode Island population density map

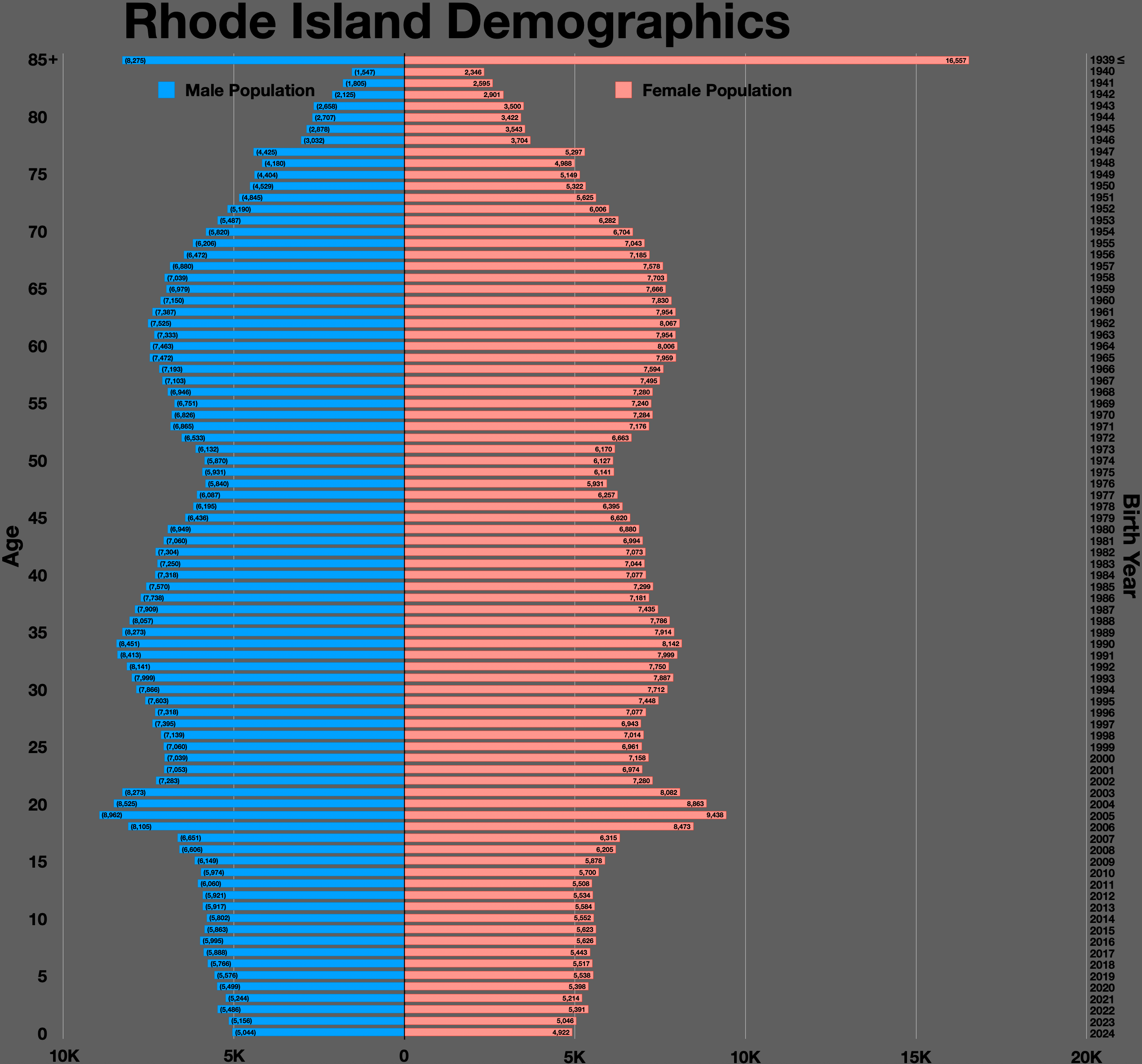
Rhode Island population pyramid

At the 2020 U.S. census, Rhode Island's population was 1,097,379. The center of population of Rhode Island is in Providence County, in the city of Cranston. A corridor of population can be seen from the Providence area, stretching northwest following the Blackstone River to Woonsocket, where 19th-century mills drove industry and development.

According to HUD's 2022 Annual Homeless Assessment Report, there were an estimated 1,577 homeless people in Rhode Island.

According to the 2020 census, 71.3% of the population was White (68.7% non-Hispanic white), 5.7% was Black or African American, 0.7% American Indian and Alaska Native, 3.6% Asian, 0.0% Native Hawaiian and other Pacific Islander, 9.4% from some other race, and 9.3% from two or more races. 16.6% of the total population was of Hispanic or Latino origin (they may be of any race).

Racial and ethnic composition as of the 2020 census
Race and ethnicity (2020)	Percentage
White (non-Hispanic)	68.7%
Hispanic or Latino	16.6%
Black (non-Hispanic)	5.0%
Asian	3.4%
Native American	0.1%
Pacific Islander	0.0%
Mixed (Two or more races)	4.6%
Other (Some other race)	1.6%

Historical racial demographics
Racial composition	1970	1990	2000	2010
White	96.6%	91.4%	85.0%	81.4%
Black	2.7%	3.9%	4.5%	5.7%
Asian	0.4%	1.8%	2.3%	2.9%
Native	0.1%	0.4%	0.5%	0.6%
Native Hawaiian and other Pacific Islander	–	–	0.1%	0.1%
Other race	0.2%	2.5%	5.0%	6.1%
Two or more races	–	–	2.7%	3.3%

Rhode Island – Racial and ethnic composition Note: the US Census treats Hispanic/Latino as an ethnic category. This table excludes Latinos from the racial categories and assigns them to a separate category. Hispanics/Latinos may be of any race.
Race / Ethnicity (NH = Non-Hispanic)	Pop 2000	Pop 2010	Pop 2020	% 2000	% 2010	% 2020
White alone (NH)	858,433	803,685	754,050	81.89%	76.35%	68.71%
Black or African American alone (NH)	41,922	51,560	55,386	4.00%	4.90%	5.05%
Native American or Alaska Native alone (NH)	4,181	4,020	3,513	0.40%	0.38%	0.32%
Asian alone (NH)	23,416	29,988	38,367	2.23%	2.85%	3.50%
Pacific Islander alone (NH)	320	305	320	0.03%	0.03%	0.03%
Other race alone (NH)	8,411	8,875	11,392	0.80%	0.84%	1.04%
Mixed race or Multiracial (NH)	20,816	23,479	52,250	1.99%	2.23%	4.76%
Hispanic or Latino (any race)	90,820	130,655	182,101	8.66%	12.41%	16.59%
Total	1,048,319	1,052,567	1,097,379	100.00%	100.00%	100.00%

Of the people residing in Rhode Island, 58.7% were born in Rhode Island, 26.6% were born in a different state, 2.0% were born in Puerto Rico, U.S. Island areas or born abroad to American parent(s), and 12.6% were foreign born.

According to the U.S. Census Bureau, as of 2015, Rhode Island had an estimated population of 1,056,298, which is an increase of 1,125, or 0.10%, from the prior year and an increase of 3,731, or 0.35%, since the year 2010. This includes a natural increase since the last census of 15,220 people (that is 66,973 births minus 51,753 deaths) and an increase due to net migration of 14,001 people into the state. Immigration from outside the United States resulted in a net increase of 18,965 people, and migration within the country produced a net decrease of 4,964 people. In 2018, The top countries of origin for Rhode Island's immigrants were the Dominican Republic, Guatemala, Portugal, Cape Verde and India.

Hispanics in the state make up 18.9% of the population, predominantly Dominican (5.9%), Puerto Rican (4.4%), and Guatemalan (3.9%) populations. Rhode Island has the highest share of Dominican Americans in the country according to latest estimates, putting the state at sixth largest Dominican community in the country.

According to the 2000 U.S. census, 84% of the population aged 5 and older spoke only American English, while 8.07% spoke Spanish at home, 3.80% Portuguese, 1.96% French, 1.39% Italian and 0.78% speak other languages at home accordingly.

The state's most populous ethnic group, non-Hispanic white, has declined from 96.1% in 1970 to 76.5% in 2011. In 2011, 40.3% of Rhode Island's children under the age of one belonged to racial or ethnic minority groups, meaning they had at least one parent who was not non-Hispanic white.

6.1% of Rhode Island's population were reported as under 5, 23.6% under 18, and 14.5% were 65 or older. Females made up approximately 52% of the population.

According to the 2010–2015 American Community Survey, the largest ancestry groups were Irish (18.3%), Italian (18.0%), English (10.5%), French (10.4%), and Portuguese (9.3%). Rhode Island has some of the highest percentages of Irish Americans and Italian Americans. Italian Americans make up a plurality in central and southern Providence County and French-Canadian Americans form a large part of northern Providence County. Irish Americans have a strong presence in Newport and Kent counties. Americans of English ancestry still have a presence in the state as well, especially in Washington County, and are often referred to as "Swamp Yankees".

Rhode Island has a notable Lusophone community, having a higher percentage of Americans of Portuguese ancestry than any other state, including Portuguese Americans and Cape Verdean Americans. Additionally, the state also has the highest percentage of Liberian immigrants, with more than 15,000 residing in the state. African immigrants, including those from Cape Verde and Liberia, form significant and growing communities in Rhode Island. Rhode Island is one of the few states where Black people of recent foreign origin outnumber Black people of multigenerational American origin (African Americans). Rhode Island also has a sizable Asian community. There is one federally recognized tribe in Rhode Island, the Narragansett Indian Tribe.

Although Rhode Island has the smallest land area of all 50 states, it has the second highest population density, second to that of New Jersey.

=== Vital statistics ===
Live Births by Race/Ethnicity of Mother
Race	2014	2015	2016	2017	2018	2019	2020	2021	2022	2023	2024
White	6,573 (60.7%)	6,702 (61.0%)	6,338 (58.7%)	6,142 (57.7%)	6,008 (57.2%)	5,564 (54.7%)	5,495 (54.4%)	5,871 (56.1%)	5,673 (55.2%)	5,266 (53.7%)	5,429 (54.2%)
Black	1,365 (12.6%)	1,392 (12.7%)	784 (7.3%)	776 (7.3%)	783 (7.5%)	836 (8.2%)	805 (8.0%)	839 (8.0%)	842 (8.2%)	797 (8.1%)	708 (7.1%)
Asian	594 (5.5%)	639 (5.8%)	565 (5.2%)	542 (5.1%)	519 (4.9%)	496 (4.9%)	476 (4.7%)	463 (4.4%)	418 (4.1%)	393 (4.0%)	420 (4.2%)
American Indian	130 (1.2%)	138 (1.2%)	63 (0.6%)	51 (0.5%)	41 (0.4%)	46 (0.4%)	36 (0.3%)	35 (0.3%)	38 (0.4%)	27 (0.3%)	31 (0.3%)
Hispanic (any race)	2,585 (23.9%)	2,622 (23.8%)	2,684 (24.8%)	2,760 (25.9%)	2,756 (26.2%)	2,921 (28.7%)	2,927 (29.0%)	2,931 (28.0%)	2,965 (28.9%)	3,008 (30.7%)	3,088 (30.9%)
Total	10,823 (100%)	10,993 (100%)	10,798 (100%)	10,638 (100%)	10,506 (100%)	10,175 (100%)	10,101 (100%)	10,464 (100%)	10,269 (100%)	9,805 (100%)	10,009 (100%)

- Since 2016, data for births of White Hispanic origin are not collected, but included in one Hispanic group; persons of Hispanic origin may be of any race.

=== Religion ===
Religious affiliation per the PRRI (2022)
Christian	72%
Unaffiliated	24%
Jewish	2%
Other faiths	2%

A Pew survey of Rhode Island residents' religious self-identification in 2014 showed the following distribution of affiliations: Catholic 42%, Protestant 30%, Jewish 1%, Jehovah's Witnesses 2%, Buddhism 1%, Mormonism 1%, Hinduism 1%, and Non-religious 20%. The largest Christian denominations as of 2010 were the Catholic Church with 456,598 adherents, the Episcopal Church with 19,377, the American Baptist Churches USA with 15,220, and the United Methodist Church with 6,901 adherents.

Rhode Island has had the highest proportion of Catholic residents of any state according to a study in 2000, mainly due to large Irish, Italian, and French-Canadian immigration in the past; recently, significant Portuguese and various Hispanic or Latino communities have also been established in the state. Though it has the highest overall Catholic percentage of any state, none of Rhode Island's individual counties ranks among the 10 most Catholic in the United States, as Catholics are evenly spread throughout the state.

According to the Public Religion Research Institute (PRRI) in 2020, 67% of the population were Christian, spread among evangelical and mainline Protestantism, and Roman Catholicism. In 2022, the Public Religion Research Institute revealed 72% of the population were Christian.

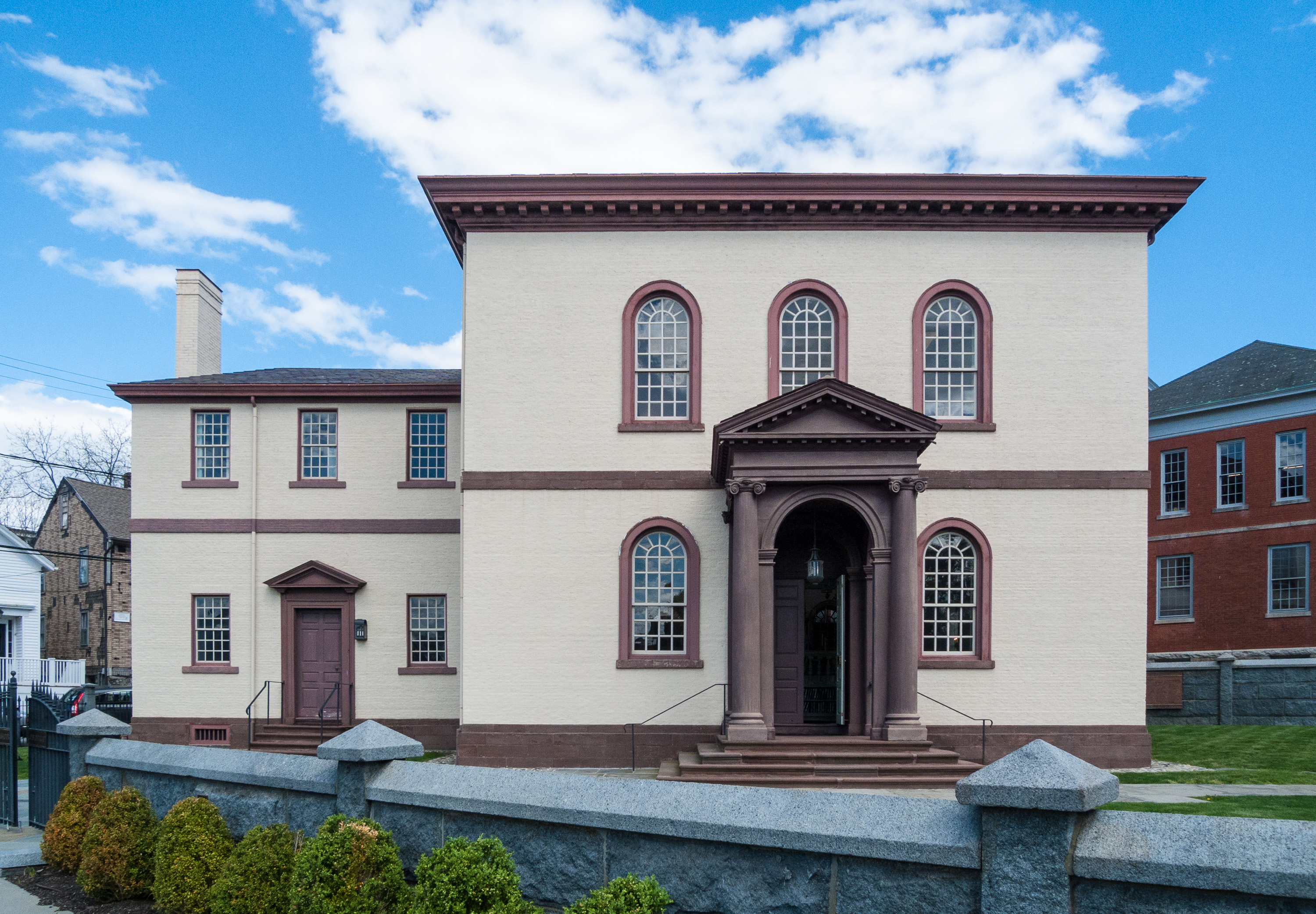
Touro Synagogue in Newport is the oldest existing synagogue building in the United States.

Rhode Island's Jewish community, centered in the Providence area, emerged during a wave of Jewish immigration predominantly from Eastern Europeans shtetls between 1880 and 1920. The presence of the Touro Synagogue in Newport, the oldest existing synagogue in the United States, emphasizes that these second-wave immigrants did not create Rhode Island's first Jewish community; a comparatively smaller wave of Spanish and Portuguese Jews immigrated to Newport during the colonial era. In 2022, they made up 2% of the state's population.

The religiously unaffiliated since 2014 were 20% of the population, though the separate study by the Public Religion Research Institute determined the irreligious increased to 29% of the adult population. In 2022, the religiously unaffiliated declined to 24% of the population.

=== Native American tribes ===
Today, many inhabitants of Rhode Island identify as being Native American alone (6,058 people in 2010 census and 7,385 in 2020) or Native American in combination with one or more other races (8,336 people in 2010 census and 15,972 in 2020). Many inhabitants of Rhode Island also reported belonging to tribes in 2010 census, the largest of which were the Narragansett (2,820 people), the Cherokee (987), the Wampanoag (559) and the Pequot (424). Other tribes included the Iroquois (278), the Micmac (101), the Abenaki (100), the Nipmuc (99) and more.

== Economy ==
The Rhode Island economy had a colonial base in fishing.

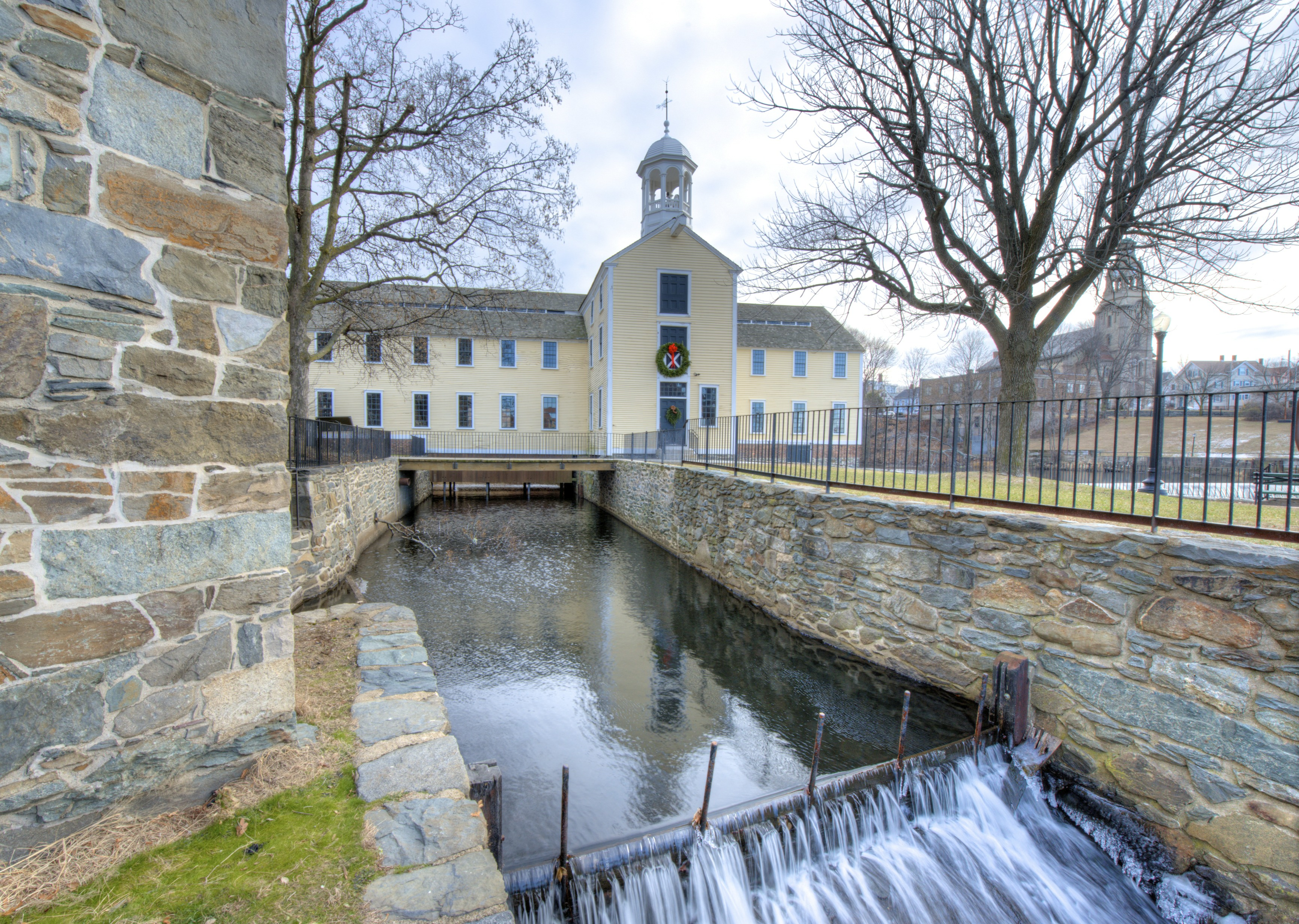
Slater Mill in Pawtucket is cited as the birthplace of the Industrial Revolution in the United States.

The Blackstone River Valley was a major contributor to the American Industrial Revolution. It was in Pawtucket that Samuel Slater set up Slater Mill in 1793, using the waterpower of the Blackstone River to power his cotton mill. For a while, Rhode Island was one of the leaders in textiles. With the Great Depression, most textile factories relocated to southern U.S. states. The textile industry still constitutes a part of the Rhode Island economy but does not have the same power.

Other important industries in Rhode Island's past included toolmaking, costume jewelry, and silverware. An interesting by-product of Rhode Island's industrial history is the number of abandoned factories, many of which are now condominiums, museums, offices, and low-income and elderly housing. Today, much of Rhode Island's economy is based on services, particularly healthcare and education, and still manufacturing to some extent. The state's nautical history continues in the 21st century in the form of nuclear submarine construction.

Per the 2013 American Community Survey, Rhode Island has the highest paid elementary school teachers in the country, with an average salary of $75,028 (adjusted to inflation).

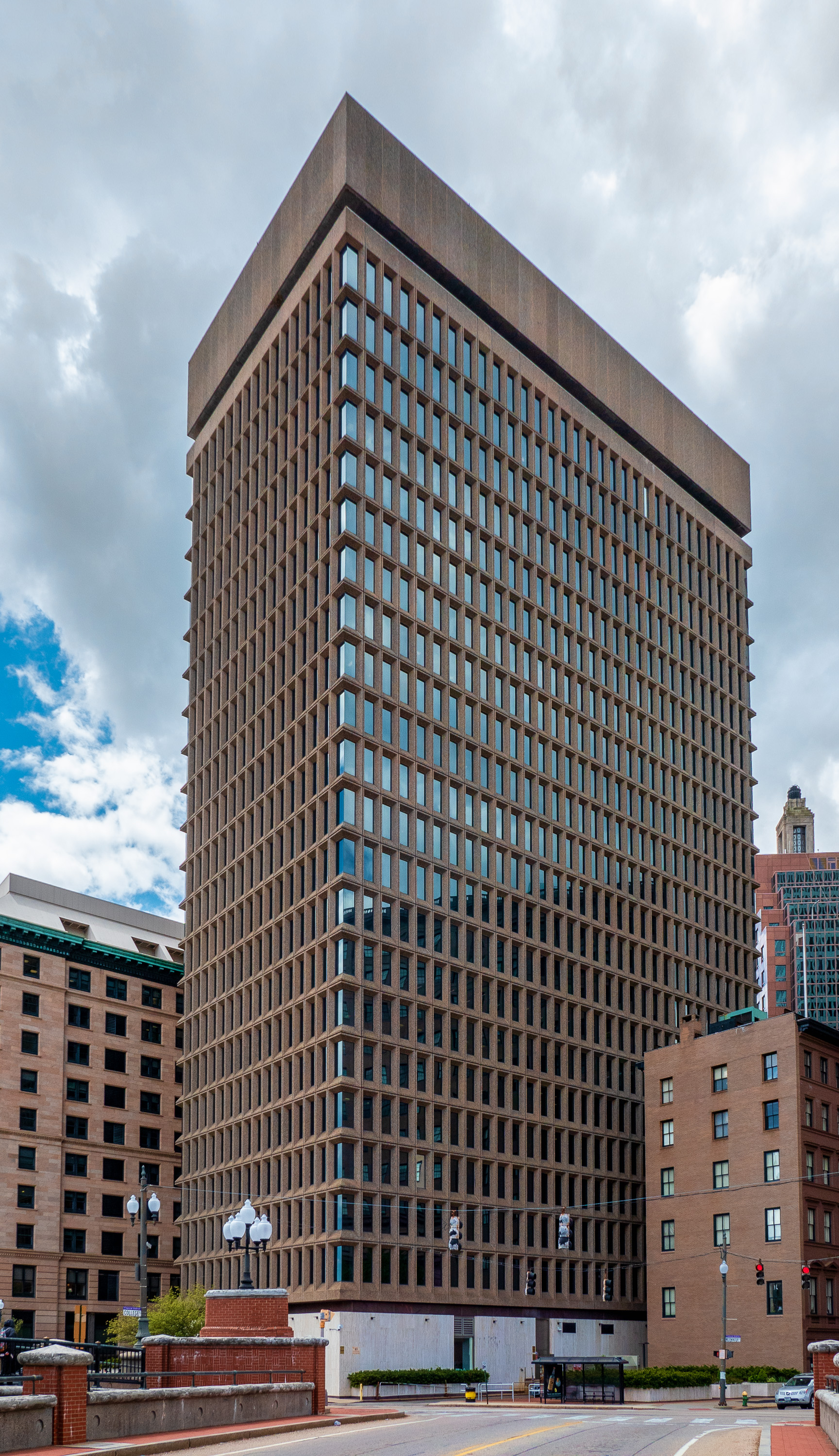
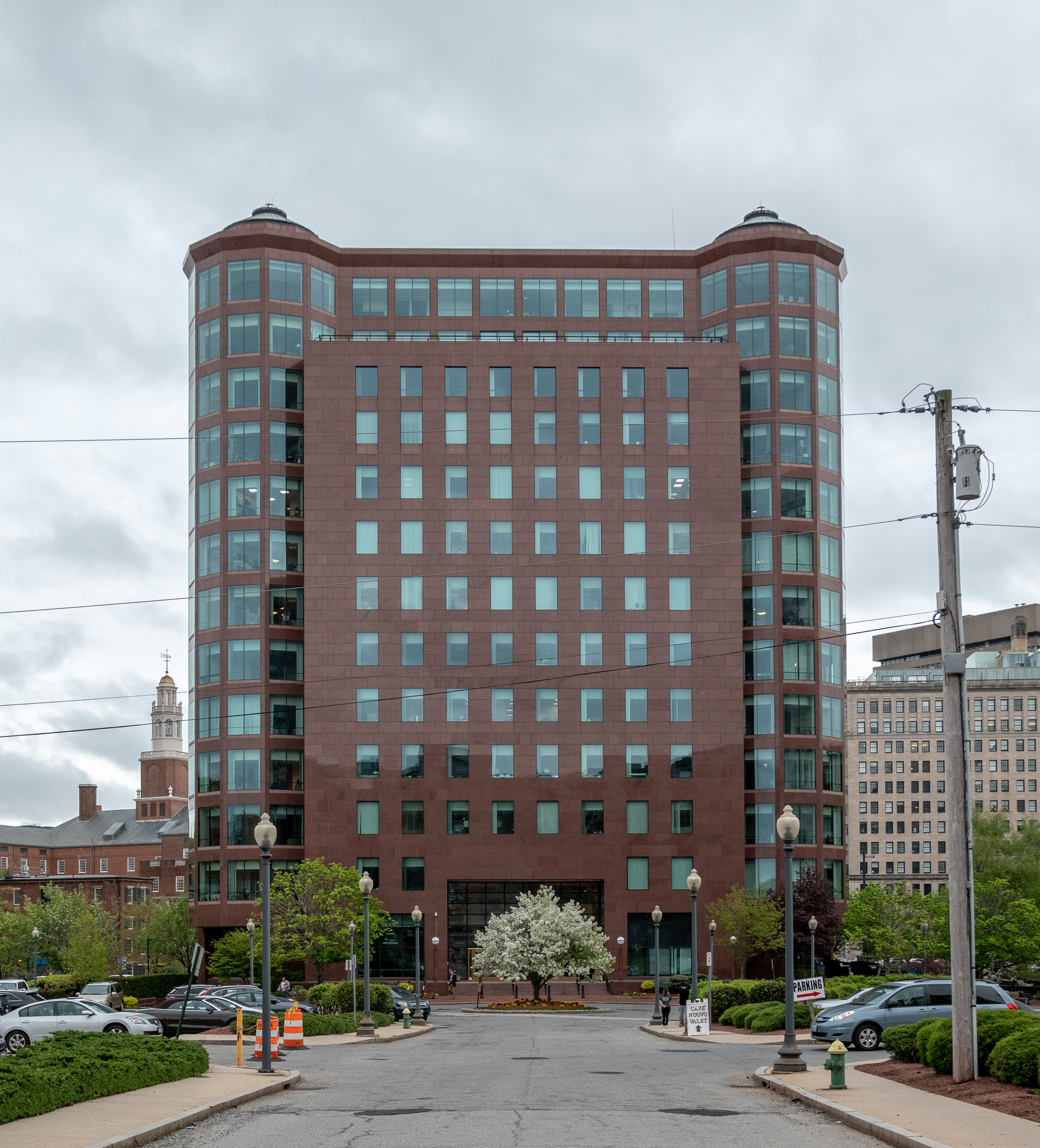
The headquarters of Textron and Citizens Financial Group in downtown Providence

The headquarters of Citizens Financial Group, the 14th largest bank in the United States, is in Providence. The Fortune 500 companies CVS Caremark and Textron are based in Woonsocket and Providence, respectively. FM Global, GTECH Corporation, Hasbro, American Power Conversion, Nortek, and Amica Mutual Insurance are all Fortune 1000 companies based in Rhode Island.

According to the Bureau of Economic Analysis, Rhode Island's gross state product in 2024 was $82.5 billion, ranking 44th in the nation.

Rhode Island's 2000 total gross state production was $46.18 billion (adjusted to inflation), placing it 45th in the nation. Its 2000 per capita personal income was $41,484 (adjusted to inflation), 16th in the nation. Rhode Island has the lowest level of energy consumption per capita of any state. Additionally, Rhode Island was rated as the 5th most energy efficient state in the country. As of August 2025, the state's unemployment rate was 4.6%. The historically highest unemployment rate was recorded April 2020 at 17.9%, and its lowest was 2.6% in June 2023.

Health services are (as of 2007) Rhode Island's largest industry. Second is tourism, supporting 39,000 jobs, with tourism-related sales at $4.56 billion (adjusted to inflation) in the year 2000. The third-largest industry is manufacturing. Its industrial outputs are submarine construction, shipbuilding, costume jewelry, fabricated metal products, electrical equipment, machinery, and boatbuilding. Rhode Island's agricultural outputs are nursery stock, vegetables, dairy products, and eggs. The largest single product is milk, which in 2017 totaled $4,563,000 in sales. In 2025, 98.9% of businesses in Rhode Island were small businesses and employed 51.1% of the state's workforce.

Rhode Island's taxes were appreciably higher than those of neighboring states, because Rhode Island's income tax was based on 25% of the payer's federal income tax payment. Former governor Donald Carcieri claimed the higher tax rate had an inhibitory effect on business growth in the state and called for reductions to increase the competitiveness of the state's business environment. In 2010, the Rhode Island General Assembly passed a new state income tax structure that Governor Carcieri signed into law on June 9, 2010. The income tax overhaul has made Rhode Island competitive with other New England states by lowering its maximum tax rate to 5.99% and reducing the number of tax brackets to three. The state's first income tax was enacted in 1971.

=== Largest employers ===
As of March 2011, Rhode Island's largest employers (excluding employees of municipalities) were:

Rank	Employer	Employees	Notes
1	State of Rhode Island	14,904	Full-time equivalents
2	Brown University Health	11,869	Rhode Island Hospital (7,024 employees), The Miriam Hospital (2,410), Newport Hospital (919), Emma Pendleton Bradley Hospital (800), Lifespan Corporate Services (580), Newport Alliance Newport (68), Lifespan MSO (53), and Home Medical (15)
3	U.S. federal government	11,581	Excludes 3,000 active duty military personnel and 7,000 reservists, but includes 250 employees of the Naval War College.
4	Roman Catholic Diocese of Providence	6,200	
5	Care New England	5,953	Employees at: Women & Infants Hospital of Rhode Island (3,134), Kent County Memorial Hospital (1,850), Butler Hospital (800), VNA of Care New England (140), and Care New England (29)
6	CVS Caremark	5,800	The corporate headquarters are at Woonsocket (5,630 employees). The corporation also has 170 employees at Pharmacare
7	Citizens Financial Group	4,991	The corporate headquarters are in Providence, as well as a large corporate campus in Johnston.
8	Brown University	4,800	Excludes student employees.
9	Stop & Shop Supermarket (subsidiary of Ahold)	3,632	
10	Bank of America	3,500	
11	Fidelity Investments	2,934	2,434 employees in Smithfield and 500 in Providence
12	Rhode Island ARC	2,851	Employees at James L. Maher Center (700), The Homestead Group (650), Cranston Arc (374), The ARC of Blackstone Valley (350), Kent County ARC (500), The Fogarty Center (225), and Westerly Chariho, ARC (52)
13	MetLife Insurance Co.	2,604	
14	General Dynamics Corp.	2,243	2,200 employees at General Dynamics Electric Boat in North Kingstown, and 43 employees at General Dynamics Information Technology – Newport in Middletown adjacent to the Naval Undersea Warfare Center
15	University of Rhode Island	2,155	
16	Wal-Mart	2,078	
17	The Jan Companies	2,050	Employees at Jan-Co Burger King (1,500) (Burger King franchiser); Newport Creamery, LLC (400), Quidnessett Country Club (100), and The Country Inn (50)
18	Shaw's Supermarkets (subsidiary of Albertsons LLC)	1,900	
19	St. Joseph Health Services and Hospitals of Rhode Island/CharterCARE Health Partners	1,865	Employees at Our Lady of Fatima Hospital (1,343) and St. Joseph Hospital for Specialty Care (522)
20	Home Depot	1,780	

== Transportation ==
=== Bus ===
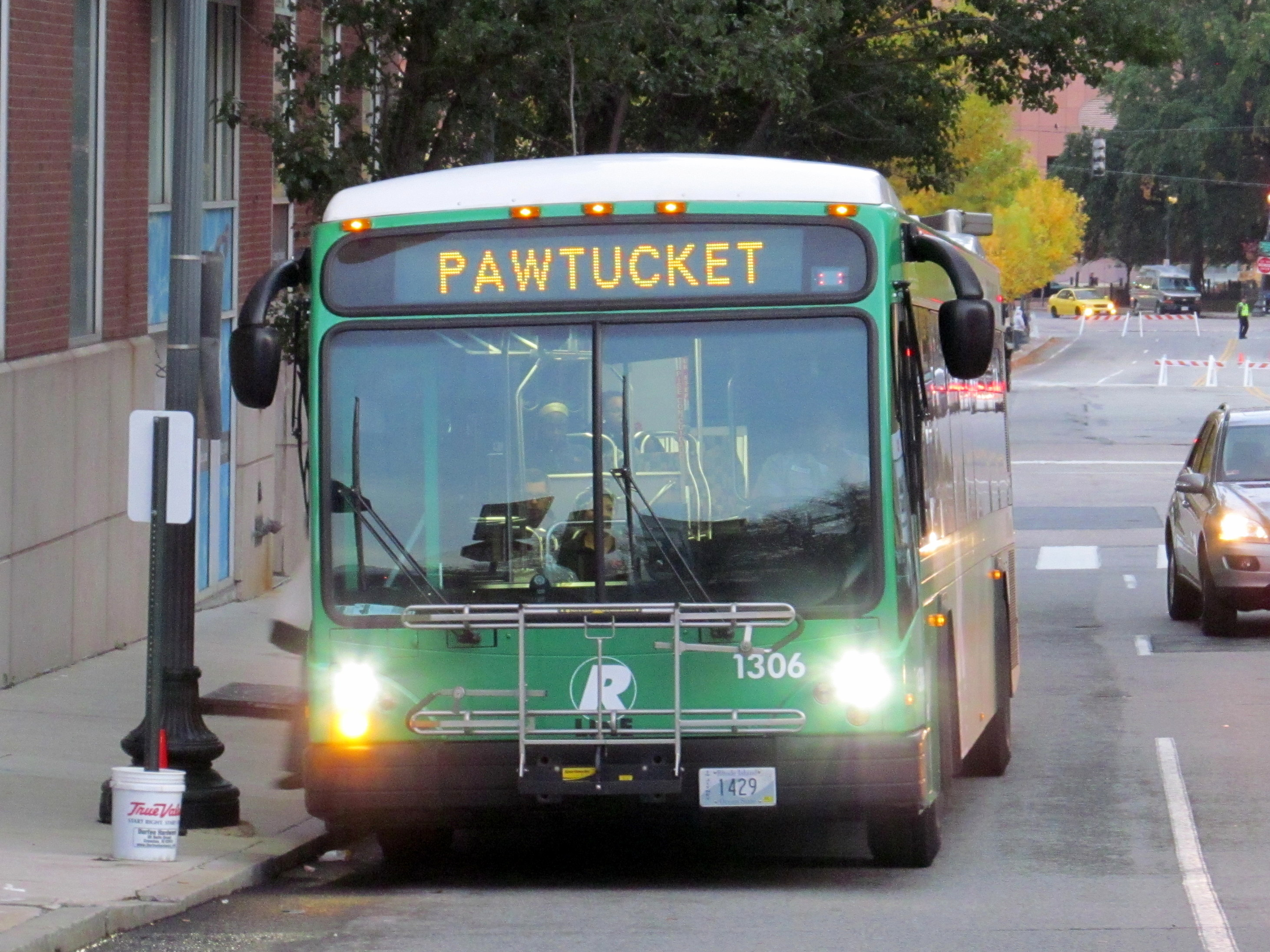
The Rhode Island Public Transit Authority operates a statewide system of bus transport.

The Rhode Island Public Transit Authority (RIPTA) operates statewide intra- and intercity bus transport from its hubs at Kennedy Plaza in Providence, Pawtucket, and Newport. RIPTA bus routes serve 38 of Rhode Island's 39 cities and towns. (New Shoreham on Block Island is not served). RIPTA operates 58 routes, including daytime trolley service (using trolley-style replica buses) in Providence and Newport.

=== Ferry ===
From 2000 through 2008, RIPTA offered seasonal ferry service linking Providence and Newport (already connected by highway) funded by grant money from the United States Department of Transportation. Though the service was popular with residents and tourists, RIPTA was unable to continue after the federal funding ended. Service was discontinued as of 2010. The service resumed in 2016 and has been successful, and as of 2025, is provided by Seastreak. The privately run Block Island Ferry links Block Island with Newport and Narragansett with traditional and fast-ferry service, while the Prudence Island Ferry connects Bristol with Prudence Island. Private ferry services also link several Rhode Island communities with ports in Connecticut, Massachusetts, and New York.

=== Rail ===
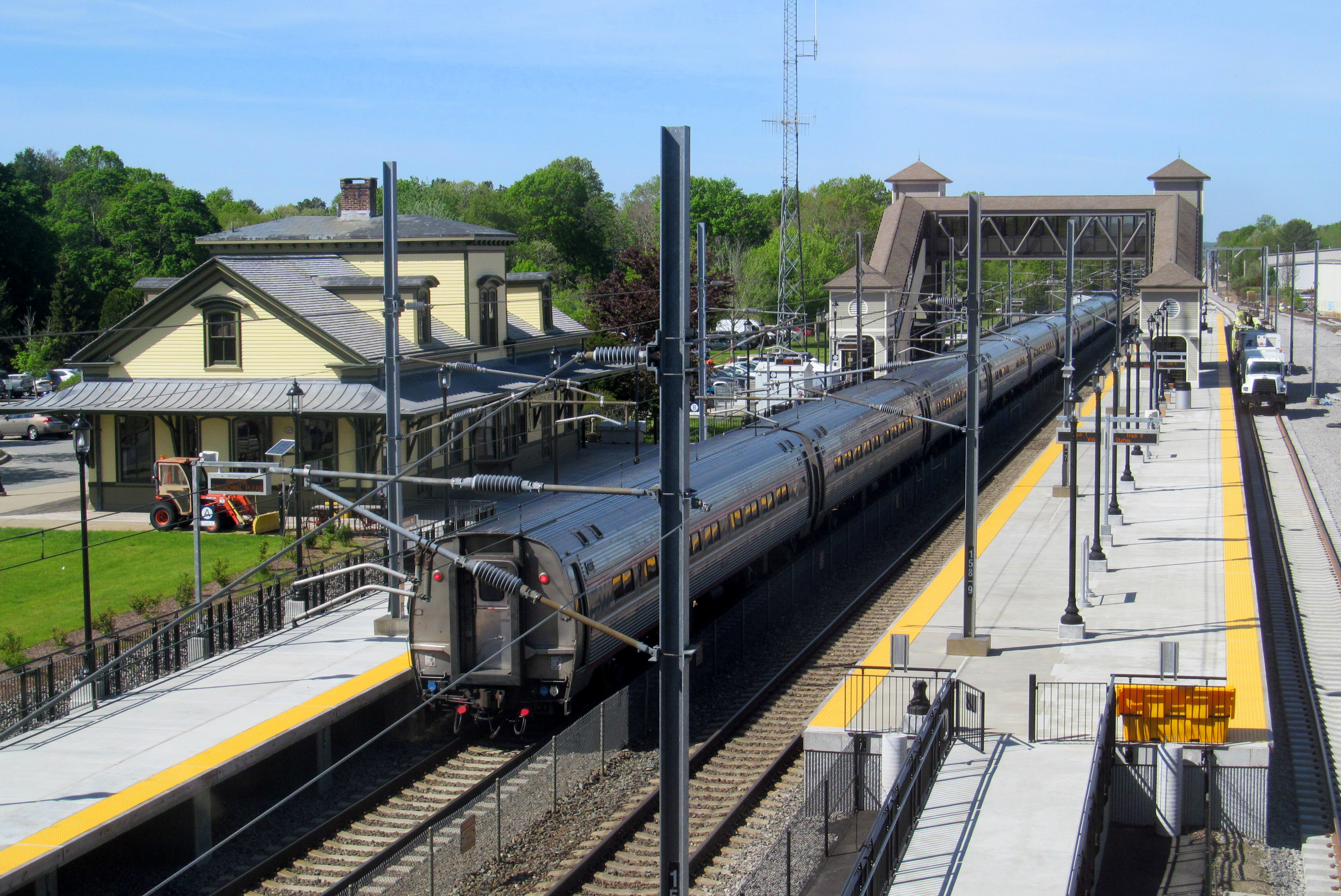
A southbound Northeast Regional train at Kingston Station

The MBTA Commuter Rail's Providence/Stoughton Line links Providence and T. F. Green Airport with Boston's South Station, with an intermediate stop at Pawtucket/Central Falls and several stations in Massachusetts. The line was later extended southward to Wickford Junction, with service beginning April 23, 2012. The state has considered proposals for extending the MBTA line to Kingston and Westerly, as well as explore the possibility of extending Connecticut's Shore Line East to T.F. Green Airport. Other proposals have contemplated a light-rail tram or rapid bus transit through: Cumberland, Central Falls, Pawtucket, Providence, Cranston, and Warwick as well. The Federal government's Amtrak Acela Express stops at Providence Station (the only Acela stop in Rhode Island), linking Providence to other cities in the Northeast Corridor. Amtrak's Northeast Regional service makes stops at Providence Station, Kingston, and Westerly.

Rhode Island is one of four states to have high-speed Northeast Corridor tracks capable of 165 mph. This was due to the fact that in the 1990s, Amtrak upgraded the NEC north of New Haven, CT to get it ready for the high-speed Acela Express trains and to extend electrified Northeast Corridor services to Boston.

=== Aviation ===
Rhode Island's primary airport for passenger and cargo transport is T. F. Green Airport in Warwick, though Rhode Islanders who wish to travel internationally on direct flights and those who seek a greater availability of flights and destinations often fly through Logan International Airport in Boston.

=== Limited access highways ===
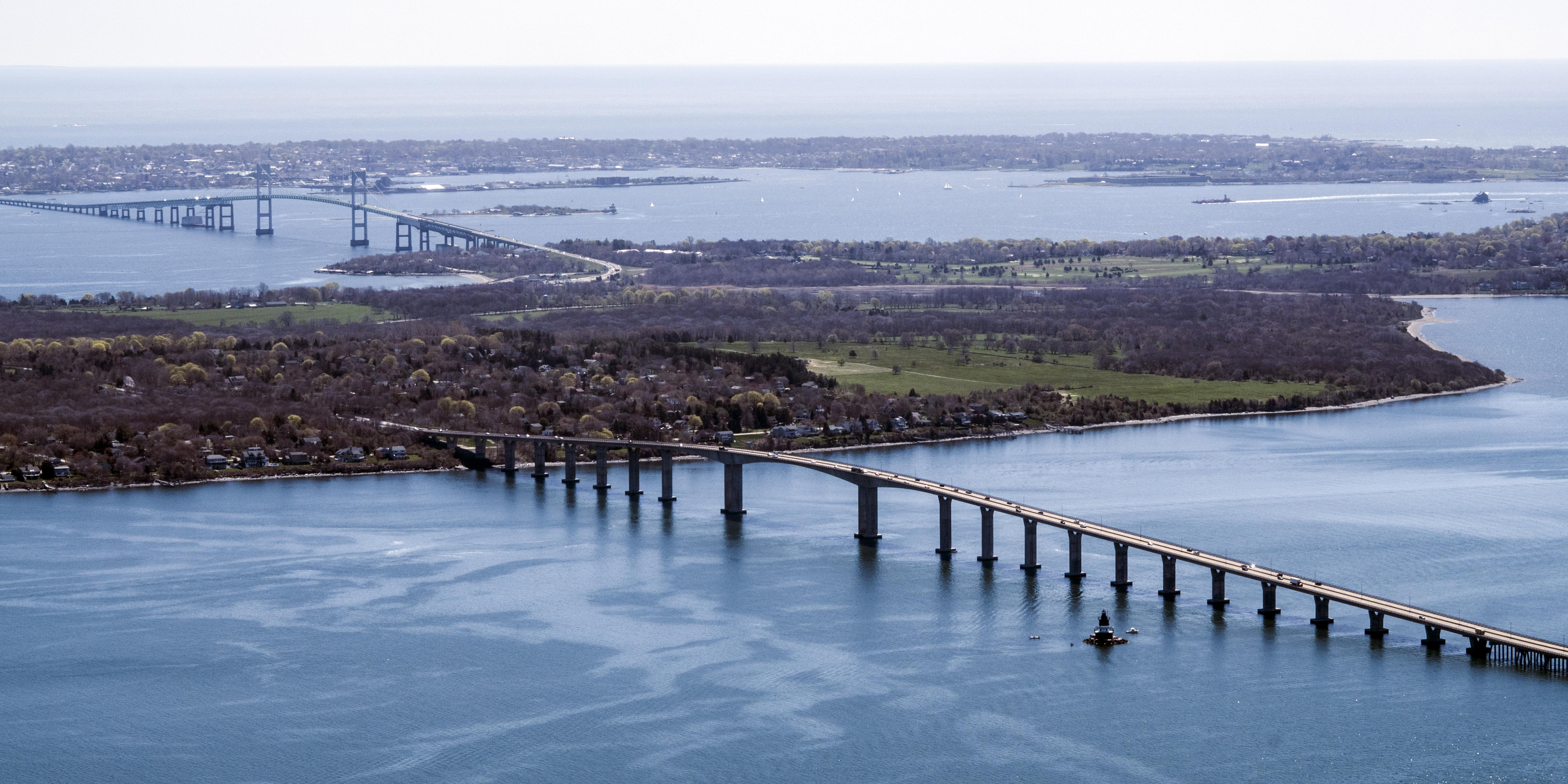
The Jamestown Verrazzano Bridge (foreground) and Claiborne Pell Newport Bridge (background)

Interstate 95 (I-95) runs southwest to northeast across the state, linking Rhode Island with other states along the East Coast. I-295 functions as a partial beltway encircling Providence to the west. I-195 provides a limited-access highway connection from Providence (and Connecticut and New York via I-95) to Cape Cod. Initially built as the easternmost link in the (now cancelled) extension of I-84 from Hartford, Connecticut, a portion of U.S. Route 6 (US 6) through northern Rhode Island is limited-access and links I-295 with downtown Providence.

Several Rhode Island highways extend the state's limited-access highway network. Route 4 is a major north–south freeway linking Providence and Warwick (via I-95) with suburban and beach communities along Narragansett Bay. Route 10 is an urban connector linking downtown Providence with Cranston and Johnston. Route 37 is an important east–west freeway through Cranston and Warwick and links I-95 with I-295. Route 99 links Woonsocket with Providence (via Route 146). Route 146 travels through the Blackstone Valley, linking Providence and I-95 with Worcester, Massachusetts and the Massachusetts Turnpike. Route 403 links Route 4 with Quonset Point.

Several bridges cross Narragansett Bay connecting Aquidneck Island and Conanicut Island to the mainland, most notably the Claiborne Pell Newport Bridge and the Jamestown-Verrazano Bridge.

=== Bicycle paths ===
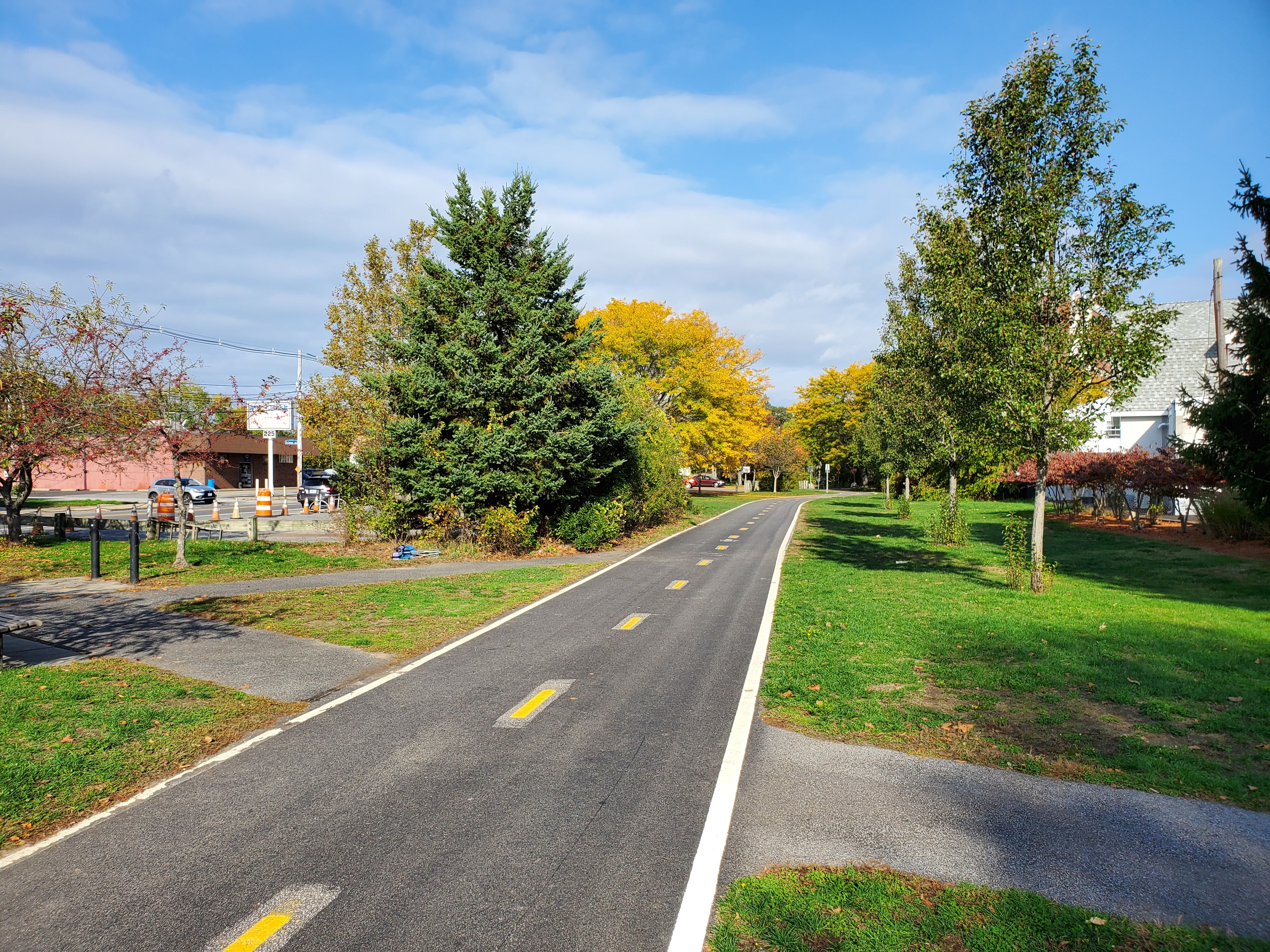
The East Bay Bike Path in Riverside

The East Bay Bike Path stretches from Providence to Bristol along the eastern shore of Narragansett Bay, while the Blackstone River Bikeway will eventually link Providence and Worcester. In 2011, Rhode Island completed work on a marked on-road bicycle path through Pawtucket and Providence, connecting the East Bay Bike Path with the Blackstone River Bikeway, completing a 33.5 miles (54 km) bicycle route through the eastern side of the state. The William C. O'Neill Bike Path (commonly known as the South County Bike Path) is an 8 mi (13 km) path through South Kingstown and Narragansett. The 19 mi (31 km) Washington Secondary Bike Path stretches from Cranston to Coventry, and the 2 mi (3.2 km) Ten Mile River Greenway path runs through East Providence and Pawtucket.

=== Future ===
In late 2019, the Rhode Island Public Transit Authority released a draft of the Rhode Island Transit Master Plan, documenting and describing a variety of proposed improvements and additions to be made to the state's public transit network by 2040. Several different proposals were offered and still under consideration as of December 2020, including implementation of a bus rapid transit system, express bus routes, expansion of Amtrak and MBTA services throughout the state, and construction of a new light rail network through downtown Providence.

== Education ==
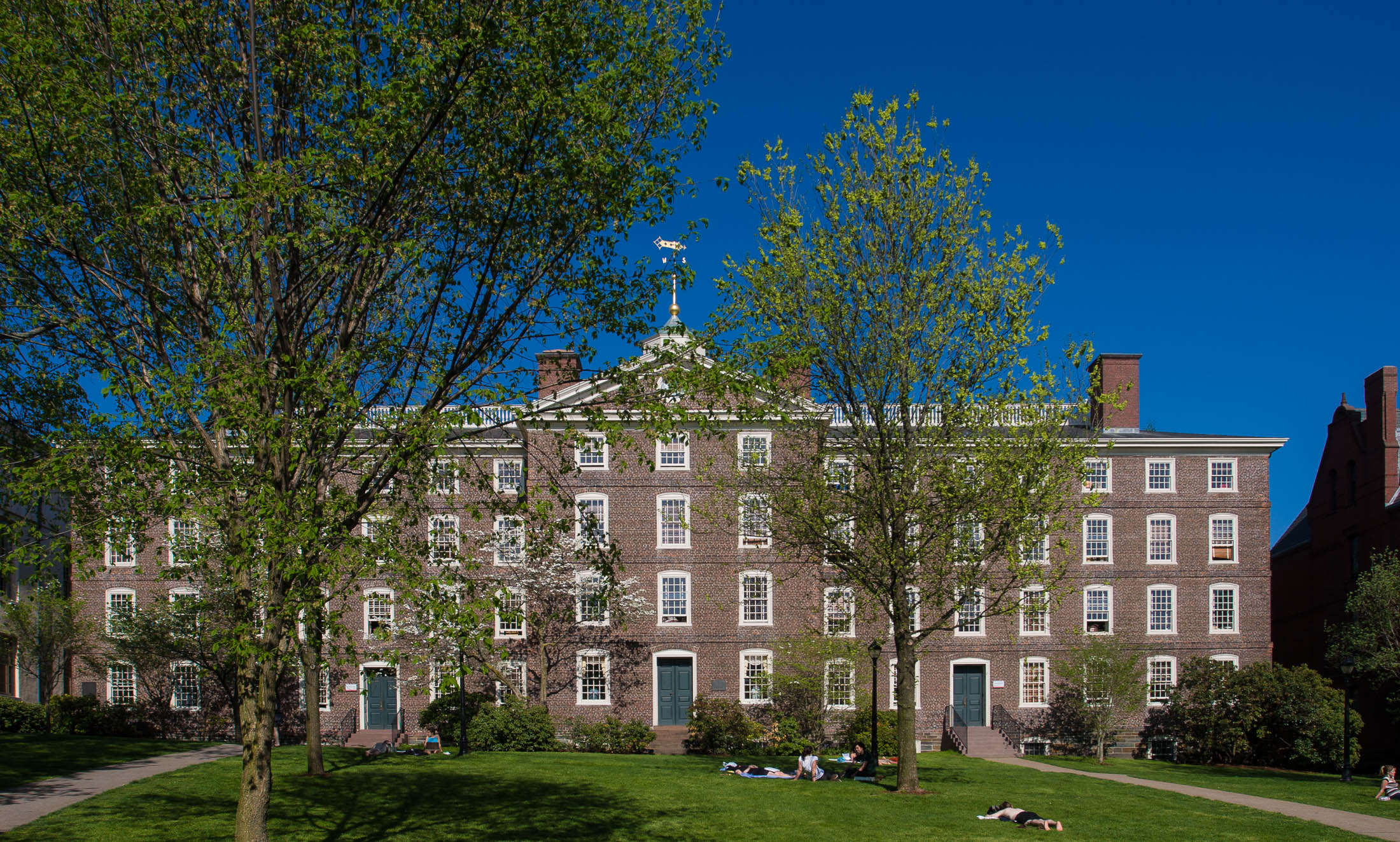
University Hall at Brown University is one of the oldest academic buildings in the United States.

=== Colleges and universities ===
Rhode Island has several colleges and universities:

- Brown University
- Bryant University
- Community College of Rhode Island
- Johnson & Wales University
- Naval War College
- New England Institute of Technology
- Providence College
- Rhode Island College
- Rhode Island School of Design
- Roger Williams University
- Salve Regina University of Newport
- University of Rhode Island

== Culture ==
=== Local accent ===
Some Rhode Islanders speak with the distinctive, non-rhotic, traditional Rhode Island accent linguists describe as a cross between New York City and Boston accents (e.g., "water" sounds like "watuh" [ˈwɔəɾə]). Many Rhode Islanders distinguish a strong aw sound [ɔə] (i.e., resist the cot–caught merger of Boston) much like one might hear in New Jersey or New York City; for example, the word coffee is pronounced [ˈkʰɔəfi]. Rhode Islanders sometimes refer to drinking fountains as "bubblers", milkshakes as "cabinets", and overstuffed foot-long sandwiches (of whatever kind) as "grinders".

=== Food and beverages ===
Rhode Island, like the rest of New England, has a tradition of clam chowder. Both the white New England and the red Manhattan varieties are popular, but there is also a unique clear-broth chowder known as Rhode Island Clam Chowder available in many restaurants. A culinary tradition in Rhode Island is the clam cake (also known as a clam fritter outside of Rhode Island), a deep fried ball of buttery dough with chopped bits of clam inside. They are sold by the half-dozen or dozen in most seafood restaurants around the state, and the quintessential summer meal in Rhode Island is chowder and clam cakes.

The quahog is a large local clam usually used in a chowder. It is also ground and mixed with stuffing or spicy minced sausage, and then baked in its shell to form a stuffie. Calamari (squid) is sliced into rings and fried as an appetizer in most Italian restaurants, typically served Sicilian-style with sliced banana peppers and marinara sauce on the side. (In 2014, calamari became the official state appetizer.) Clams Casino originated in Rhode Island, invented by Julius Keller, the maître d' in the original Casino next to the seaside Towers in Narragansett. Clams Casino resemble the beloved stuffed quahog but are generally made with the smaller littleneck or cherrystone clam and are unique in their use of bacon as a topping.

The official state drink of Rhode Island is coffee milk, a beverage created by mixing milk with coffee syrup. This unique syrup was invented in the state and is sold in almost all Rhode Island supermarkets, as well as its bordering states. Johnnycakes have been a Rhode Island staple since Colonial times, made with corn meal and water then pan-fried much like pancakes.

Submarine sandwiches are called grinders throughout Rhode Island, and the Italian grinder, made with cold cuts such as ham, prosciutto, capicola, salami, and Provolone cheese, is especially popular. Linguiça or chouriço is a spicy Portuguese sausage often served with peppers and eaten with hearty bread.

=== Rhode Island state symbols ===
State symbols of Rhode Island
List of state symbols
- Flag of Rhode Island

- Seal of Rhode Island

- Coat of arms of Rhode Island

Living insignia
- Bird: Rhode Island Red chicken Gallus gallus domesticus
- Fish: Striped bass
- Flower: Blue Violet; Viola sororia
- Fruit: Rhode Island Greening
- Insect: American burying beetle Nicroforus americanus
- Reptile: Painted turtle
- Tree: Red Maple; Acer rubrum

Inanimate insignia
- Beverage: Coffee milk
- Mineral: Bowenite
- Rock: Cumberlandite
- Ship: USS Providence
- Tartan: Rhode Island State Tartan

State route marker

State quarter
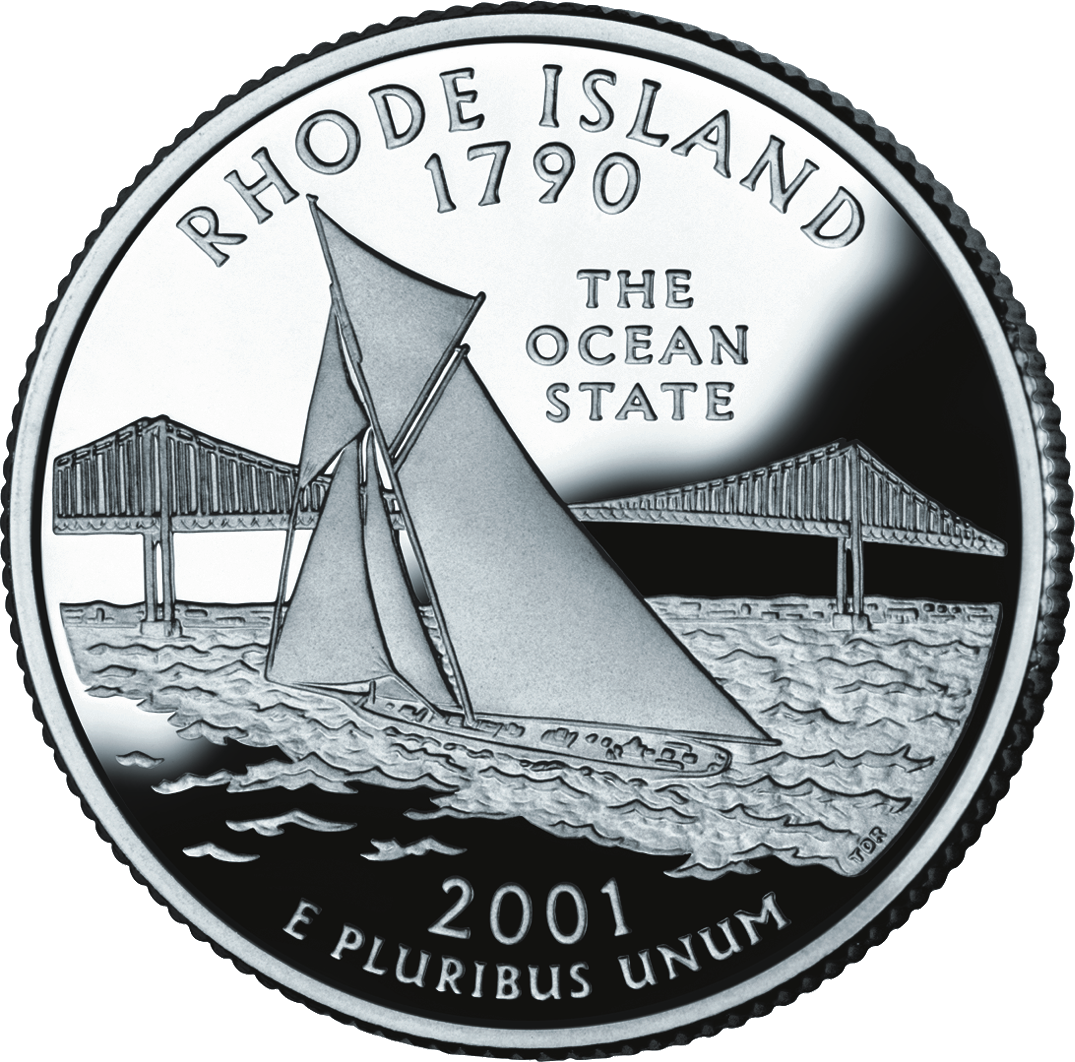
- Released in 2001

=== In popular culture ===
Jacqueline Bouvier and John F. Kennedy were married at St. Mary's church in Newport. Their reception took place at Hammersmith Farm, the Bouvier summer home in Newport.

Cartoonist Don Bousquet, a state icon, has made a career out of Rhode Island culture, drawing Rhode Island-themed gags in The Providence Journal and Yankee magazine. These cartoons have been reprinted in the Quahog series of paperbacks (I Brake for Quahogs, Beware of the Quahog, and The Quahog Walks Among Us.) Bousquet has also collaborated with humorist and Providence Journal columnist Mark Patinkin on two books: The Rhode Island Dictionary and The Rhode Island Handbook.

=== Film and television ===
Rhode Island has been the setting or the filming location of many feature films, documentaries, and television series.

The Farrelly brothers and Seth MacFarlane depict Rhode Island in popular culture, often making comedic parodies of the state. MacFarlane's television series Family Guy is based in a fictional Rhode Island city named Quahog, and notable local events and celebrities are regularly lampooned. Peter Griffin is seen working at the Pawtucket brewery, and other state locations are mentioned.

The 1956 film High Society (starring Bing Crosby, Grace Kelly, and Frank Sinatra) was set in Newport, Rhode Island.

The 1974 film adaptation of The Great Gatsby was also filmed in Newport.

The 1998 film Meet Joe Black was filmed at Aldrich Mansion in the Warwick Neck area of Warwick.

The TV series Brotherhood is set in Rhode Island.

The first season of the medical drama series Body of Proof was filmed entirely in Rhode Island. The show premiered on March 29, 2011.

The 2007 Steve Carell and Dane Cook film Dan in Real Life was filmed in various coastal towns in the state. The sunset scene with the entire family on the beach takes place at Napatree Point.

Jersey Shore star Pauly D filmed part of his spin-off The Pauly D Project in his hometown of Johnston.

The Comedy Central cable television series Another Period is set in Newport during the Gilded Age.

In 2025, Ocean State: Rhode Island's Wild Coast, a docuseries focusing on oceanic wildlife off Rhode Island, was released on WSBE and streamed on PBS.

=== Notable firsts in Rhode Island ===
Rhode Island has been the first in a number of initiatives. The Colony of Rhode Island and Providence Plantations enacted the first law prohibiting slavery in America on May 18, 1652.

The first act of armed rebellion in America against the British Crown was the boarding and burning of the Revenue Schooner HMS Gaspée in Narragansett Bay on June 10, 1772. The idea of a Continental Congress was first proposed at a town meeting in Providence on May 17, 1774. Rhode Island elected the first delegates (Stephen Hopkins and Samuel Ward) to the Continental Congress on June 15, 1774. The Rhode Island General Assembly created the first standing army in the colonies (1,500 men) on April 22, 1775. On June 15, 1775, the first naval engagement took place in the American Revolution between an American sloop commanded by Capt. Abraham Whipple and an armed tender of the British Frigate Rose. The tender was chased aground and captured. Later in June, the General Assembly created the American Navy when it commissioned the sloops Katy and Washington, armed with 24 guns and commanded by Abraham Whipple who was promoted to Commodore. Rhode Island was the first Colony to declare independence from Britain on May 4, 1776.

Slater Mill in Pawtucket was the first commercially successful cotton-spinning mill with a fully mechanized power system in America and was the birthplace of the Industrial Revolution in the US. The oldest Fourth of July parade in the country is still held annually in Bristol, Rhode Island. The first Baptist church in America was founded in Providence in 1638. Ann Smith Franklin of the Newport Mercury was the first female newspaper editor in America (August 22, 1762). Touro Synagogue is the oldest synagogue in America, founded in Newport in 1763.

Pelham Street in Newport was the first in America to be illuminated by gaslight in 1806. The first strike in the United States in which women participated occurred in Pawtucket in 1824. Watch Hill has the nation's oldest flying horses carousel that has been in continuous operation since 1850. The motion picture machine was patented in Providence on April 23, 1867. The first lunch wagon in America was introduced in Providence in 1872. The first nine-hole golf course in America was completed in Newport in 1890. The first state health laboratory was established in Providence on September 1, 1894. The Rhode Island State House was the first building with an all-marble dome to be built in the United States (1895–1901). The first automobile race on a track was held in Cranston on September 7, 1896. The first automobile parade was held in Newport on September 7, 1899, on the grounds of Belcourt Castle.

=== Miscellaneous local culture ===
Rhode Island is nicknamed "The Ocean State", and the nautical nature of Rhode Island's geography pervades its culture. Newport Harbor, in particular, holds many pleasure boats. In the lobby of T. F. Green, the state's main airport, is a large life-sized sailboat, and the state's license plates depict an ocean wave or a sailboat.

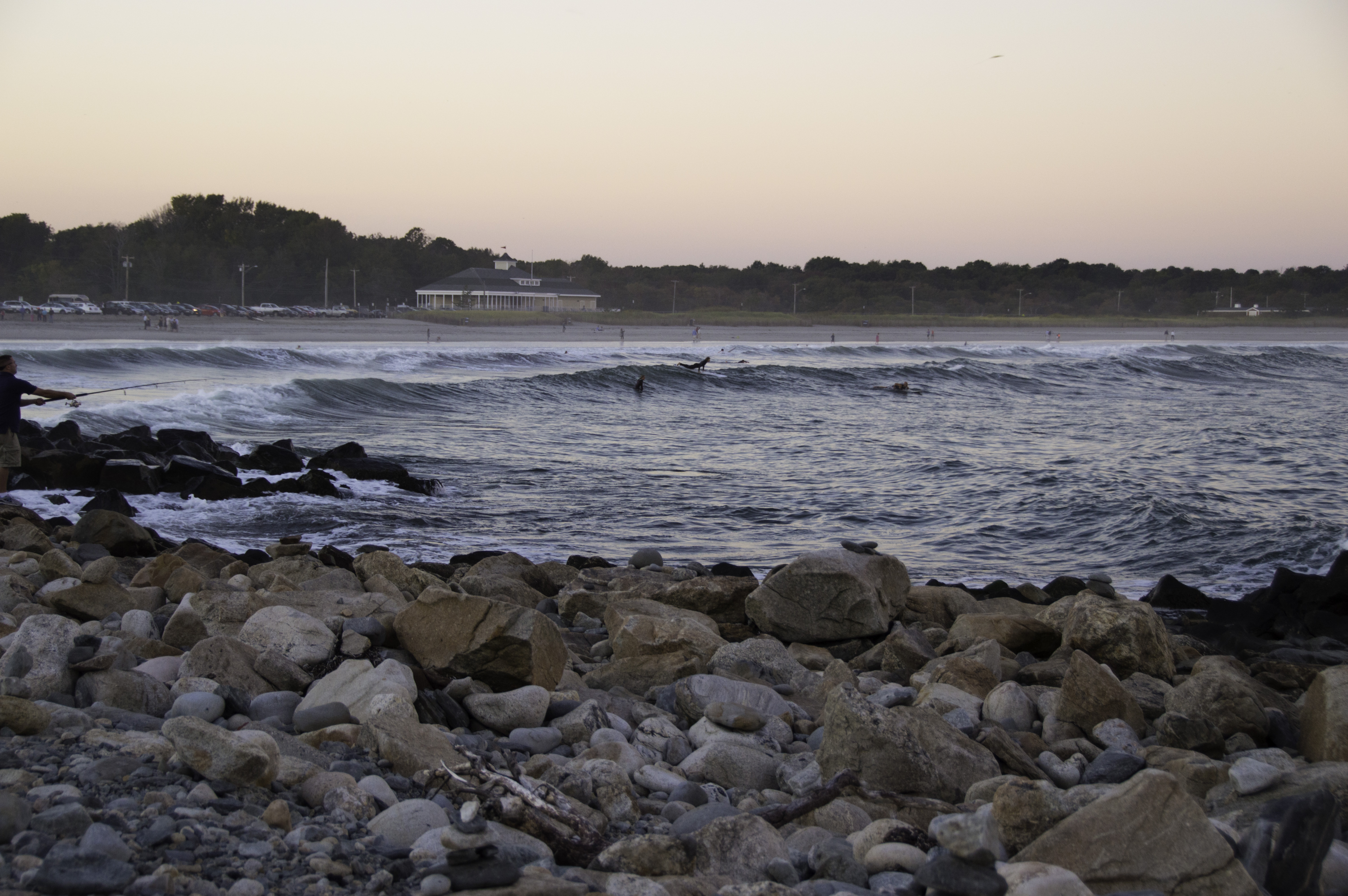
Many Rhode Islanders visit Washington County for its beaches

The large number of beaches in Washington County lures many Rhode Islanders south for summer vacation.

The state constitution protects shore access, including swimming and gathering of seaweed. The 1982 Rhode Island Supreme Court decision in State v. Ibbison defines the end of private land as the mean high tide line, which is difficult to determine in day-to-day activities, and has resulted in beach access conflicts. Underfunding of the Rhode Island Coastal Resources Management Council has resulted in lax enforcement against encroachment on public access and building of illegal structures.

The state was notorious for organized crime activity from the 1950s into the 1990s when the Patriarca crime family held sway over most of New England from its Providence headquarters.

Rhode Islanders developed a unique style of architecture in the 17th century called the stone-ender.

Rhode Island is the only state to still celebrate Victory over Japan Day, which is officially named "Victory Day" but is sometimes referred to as "VJ Day". It is celebrated on the second Monday in August.

Nibbles Woodaway, more commonly referred to as "the Big Blue Bug", is a 58-foot-long termite mascot for a Providence extermination business. Since its construction in 1980, it has been featured in several movies and television shows, and has come to be recognized as a cultural landmark by many locals. In more recent times, the Big Blue Bug has been given a mask to remind locals and visitors to mask-up during the COVID-19 pandemic.

=== Music ===
The Newport Folk and Jazz festivals are held annually at Fort Adams State Park in Newport. The jazz fesitval was established in 1954, was held annually until 1971, and was re-established at Fort Adams in 1981. The folk festival was established in 1959, was held until 1969, and was revived in 1985. It was held in Newport through 1969, returned to the city in 1985, and has been held annually at Fort Adams since. Bob Dylan's performance with an electric guitar at the 1965 Newport Folk Festival was influential to later folk rock musicians.

The Beach Boys performed to 40,000 people at Narragansett Park in Pawtucket on September 2, 1977, which is recognized as the largest concert in the history of Rhode Island.

=== Sports ===
==== Professional ====
Two professional minor league teams play in Rhode Island. The Providence Bruins ice hockey team—which won the AHL's Calder Cup during the 1998–99 AHL season—is affiliated with the Boston Bruins, and play at Amica Mutual Pavilion in Providence. The Rhode Island FC, an association football soccer team, began competing in the second tier USL Championship in 2024 at Beirne Stadium at Bryant University, and now play at Centreville Bank Stadium in Pawtucket.

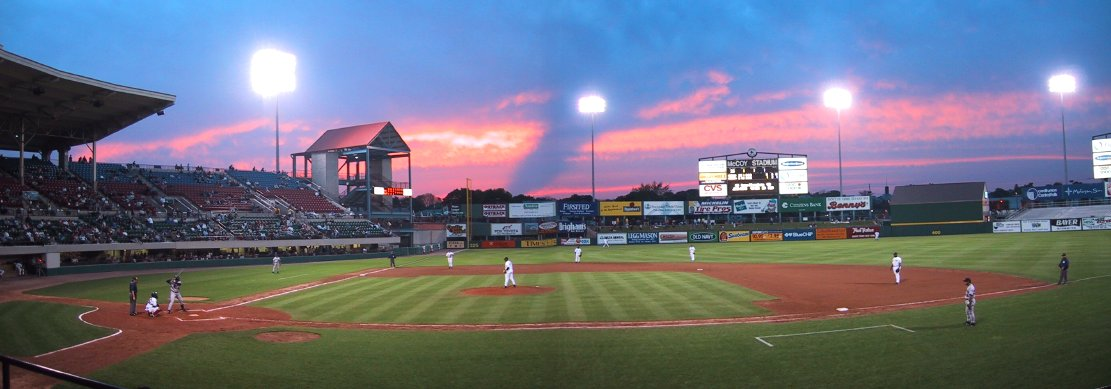
The Pawtucket Red Sox played at McCoy Stadium

The Pawtucket Red Sox baseball team was a Triple-A International League affiliate of the nearby Boston Red Sox from 1973 to 2020. They played at McCoy Stadium in Pawtucket and had won four league titles, the Governors' Cup, in 1973, 1984, 2012, and 2014. McCoy Stadium also has the distinction of being home to the longest professional baseball game ever played – 33 innings.

The Providence Reds were a hockey team that played in the Canadian-American Hockey League (CAHL) from 1926 to 1936, and the American Hockey League (AHL) from 1936 to 1977, the last season of which they played as the Rhode Island Reds. The team won the Calder Cup in 1938, 1940, 1949, and 1956. The Reds played at the Rhode Island Auditorium, on North Main Street in Providence, Rhode Island from 1926 through 1972, when the team affiliated with the New York Rangers and moved into the newly built Providence Civic Center. The team name came from the state bird, a rooster known as the Rhode Island Red. They moved to New York in 1977, then to Connecticut in 1997, and are now called the Hartford Wolf Pack.

The Reds are the oldest continuously operating minor-league hockey franchise in North America, having fielded a team in one form or another since 1926 in the CAHL. It is also the only AHL franchise to have never missed a season. The AHL returned to Providence in 1992 in the form of the Providence Bruins.

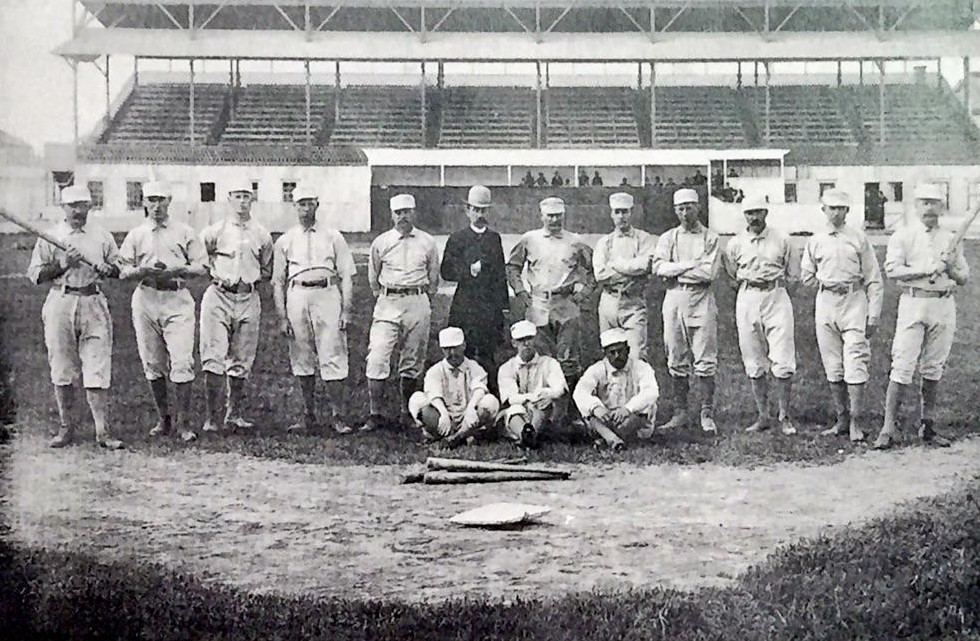
1884 Baseball Champion Providence Grays

Before the great expansion of athletic teams all over the country, Providence and Rhode Island in general played a great role in supporting teams. The Providence Grays won the first World Championship in baseball history in 1884. The team played their home games at the old Messer Street Field in Providence. The Grays played in the National League from 1878 to 1885. They defeated the New York Metropolitans of the American Association in a best of five-game series at the Polo Grounds in New York. Providence won three straight games to become the first champions in major league baseball history. Babe Ruth played for the minor league Providence Grays of 1914 and hit his only official minor league home run for them before the Grays' parent club, the Boston Red Stockings, recalled him.

Rhode Island has deep history with the sport of soccer where the sport was played as early as 1886 when the state's first organized league would be founded, known as the Rhode Island Football Association (RIFA). One of their teams, the Pawtucket Free Wanderers, would establish themselves as a regional power and win the American Cup in 1893. The first championship game of the U.S. Open Cup was also held in 1914 in Pawtucket's Coates Field to a crowd of 10,000. Later, a team known as Pawtucket Rangers F.C. would win the 1941 edition of the U.S. Open Cup (then National Challenge Cup). The Rhode Island Oceaneers would later be founded, and went on to win the 1974 American Soccer League championship. Other former semiprofessional soccer teams of the modern era include the Rhode Island Stingrays of the USL Premier Development League, and the Rhode Island Reds of the National Premier Soccer League, with both leagues regarded as the fourth tier of American soccer.

The now-defunct professional football team known as the Providence Steamrollers won the 1928 NFL title. They played in a 10,000 person stadium called the Cycledrome. An unrelated basketball team also known as the Providence Steamrollers played in the Basketball Association of America, which would become the National Basketball Association.

Rhode Island's only rugby league team was the Rhode Island Rebellion, a semi-professional team that was a founding member of the USA Rugby League, which was at the time the top competition in the United States for the sport of rugby league. The Rebellion played their home games at Classical High School in Providence.

===== Current professional teams =====
Professional Team	League	Sport	Venue	City	Established	Championships
Providence Bruins	American Hockey League (AHL)	Ice hockey	Amica Mutual Pavilion	Providence, Rhode Island	1987	1
Rhode Island FC	USL Championship (USLC)	Soccer	Centreville Bank Stadium	Pawtucket, Rhode Island	2024	0
Rhode Island Breakers	United Football League (UFL)	American football	Centreville Bank Stadium	Pawtucket, Rhode Island	2027	0
UpShot Providence	UpShot League (UPSHOT)	Basketball	Amica Mutual Pavilion	Providence, Rhode Island	2026	0

===== Current semi-professional teams =====
Semi-Professional Team	League	Sport	Venue	City	Established	Championships
Rhode Island Rogues	Women's Premier Soccer League (WPSL)	Soccer	Roger Williams University	Bristol, Rhode Island	2018	0

==== Collegiate and amateur sports ====
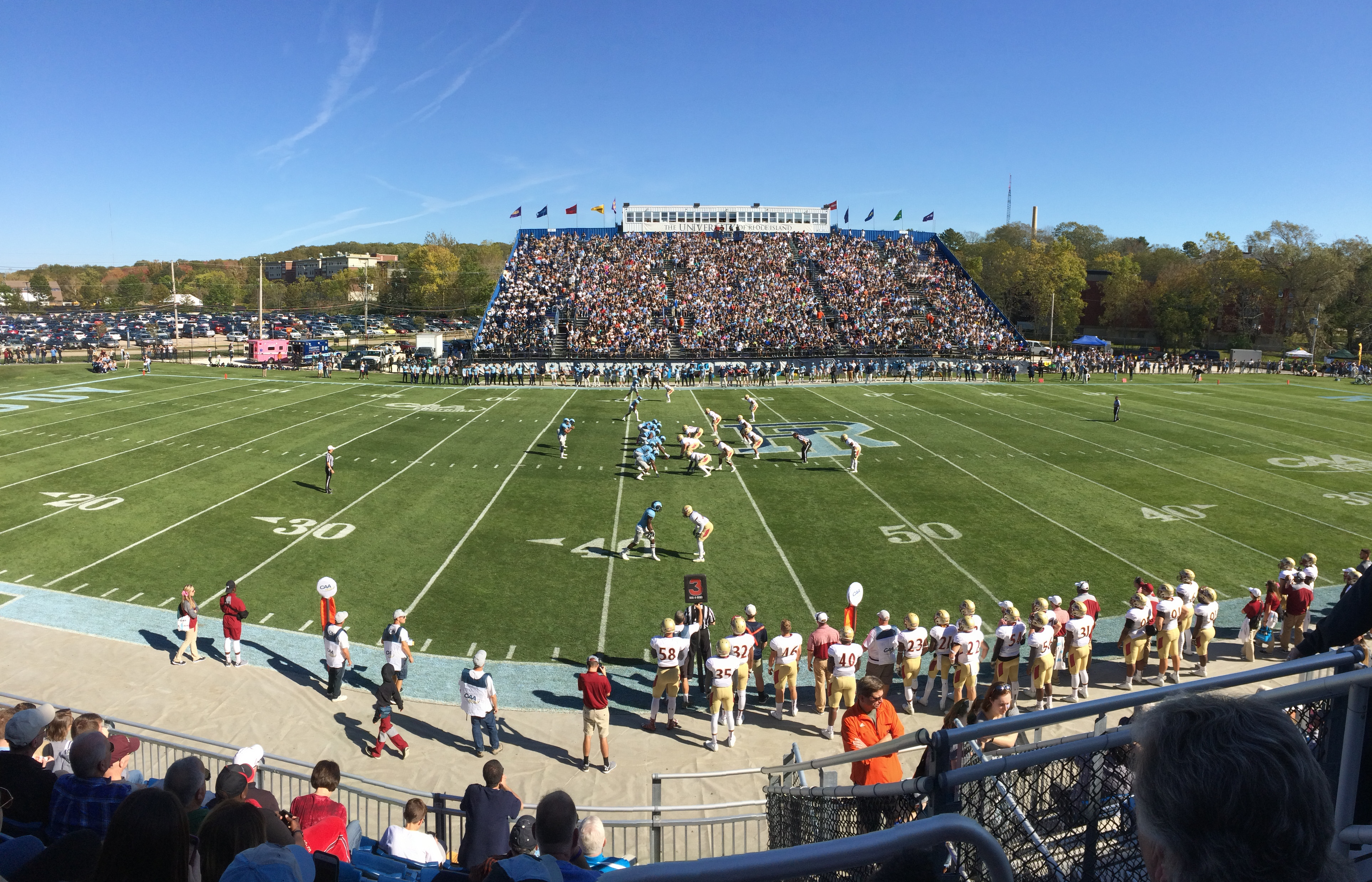
University of Rhode Island's Meade Stadium in Kingston

There are four NCAA Division I schools in Rhode Island. All four schools compete in different conferences. The Brown University Bears compete in the Ivy League, the Bryant University Bulldogs compete in the America East Conference, the Providence College Friars compete in the Big East Conference, and the University of Rhode Island Rams compete in the Atlantic 10 Conference. Three of the schools' football teams compete in the Football Championship Subdivision, the second-highest level of college football in the United States. Brown plays FCS football in the Ivy League, Bryant plays FCS football in the Big South Conference before that league merges its football operations with those of the Ohio Valley Conference in 2023, and Rhode Island plays FCS football in CAA Football, the technically separate football league of the Colonial Athletic Association. All four Division I schools in the state compete in an intrastate all-sports competition known as the Ocean State Cup, with Bryant winning the most recent cup in 2011–12 academic year.

From 1930 to 1983, America's Cup races were sailed off Newport, and the extreme-sport X Games and Gravity Games were founded and hosted in the state's capital city.

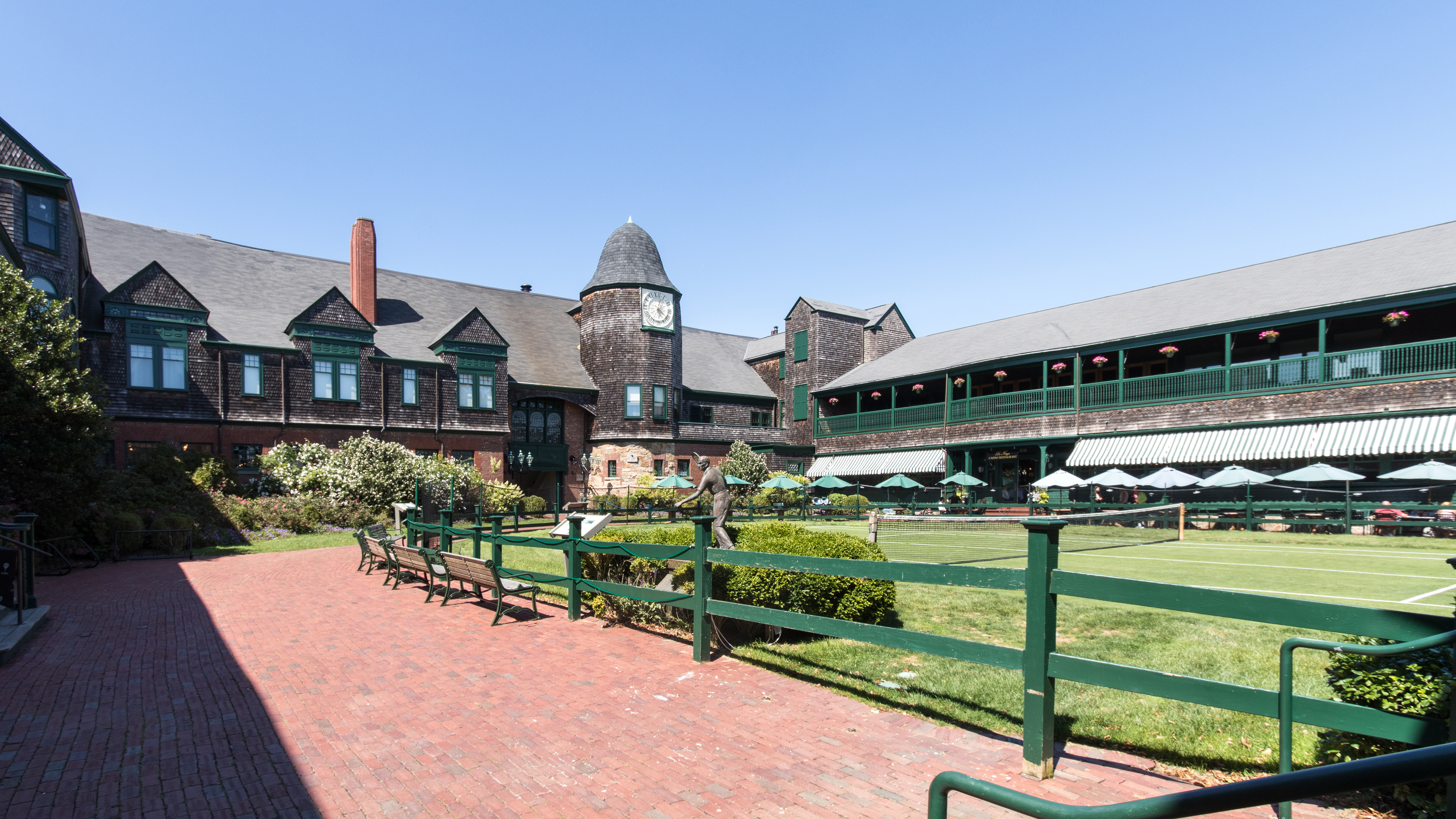
The International Tennis Hall of Fame in Newport

The International Tennis Hall of Fame is in Newport at the Newport Casino, site of the first U.S. National Championships in 1881. The Hall of Fame and Museum were established in 1954 by Jimmy Van Alen as "a shrine to the ideals of the game".

Rhode Island is also home to the headquarters of the governing body for youth rugby league in the United States, the American Youth Rugby League Association or AYRLA. The AYRLA has started the first-ever rugby league youth competition in Providence Middle Schools, a program at the RI Training School, in addition to starting the first high school competition in the US in Providence Public High School.

== Government ==
Gubernatorial election results
Year	Democratic	Republican
1950	59.3% 176,125	40.7% 120,683
1952	52.6% 215,587	47.4% 194,102
1954	57.7% 189,595	41.7% 137,131
1956	50.1% 192,315	49.9% 191,604
1958	49.1% 170,275	50.9% 176,505
1960	56.6% 227,318	43.4% 174,044
1962	49.9% 163,554	50.1% 163,952
1964	38.9% 152,165	61.2% 239,501
1966	36.7% 121,862	63.3% 210,202
1968	51.0% 195,766	49.0% 187,958
1970	50.1% 173,420	49.5% 171,549
1972	52.6% 216,953	47.1% 194,315
1974	78.5% 252,436	21.5% 69,224
1976	54.8% 218,561	44.7% 178,254
1978	62.8% 197,386	30.7% 96,596
1980	73.7% 299,174	26.3% 106,729
1982	73.3% 247,208	23.6% 79,602
1984	40.0% 163,311	60.0% 245,059
1986	32.4% 104,504	64.7% 208,822
1988	49.2% 196,925	50.8% 203,550
1990	74.1% 264,411	25.9% 92,177
1992	61.6% 261,484	34.3% 145,590
1994	43.6% 157,361	47.4% 171,194
1998	42.1% 129,105	51.0% 156,180
2002	45.2% 150,229	54.7% 181,827
2006	49.0% 189,503	51.0% 197,306
2010	23.1% 78,896	33.6% 114,911
2014	40.7% 131,452	36.2% 117,106
2018	52.6% 198,122	37.2% 139,932
2022	57.9% 207,166	38.9% 139,001

The capital of Rhode Island is Providence. The state's governor is Daniel McKee (D), and the lieutenant governor is Sabina Matos (D). Gina Raimondo became Rhode Island's first female governor with a plurality of the vote in the November 2014 state elections. Rhode Island is one of a few states that do not have an official governor's residence. Its United States senators are Jack Reed (D) and Sheldon Whitehouse (D). Rhode Island's two United States representatives are Gabe Amo (D-1) and Seth Magaziner (D-2). The state legislature is the Rhode Island General Assembly, consisting of the 75-member House of Representatives and the 38-member Senate. The Democratic Party dominates both houses of the bicameral body; the Republican Party's presence is minor in the state government, with Republicans holding a handful of seats in both the Senate and House of Representatives.

== Elections ==
County results of the 2024 Presidential election. Kamala Harris (D) won every county, though she won Kent County by a narrow margin of 1.9%

United States presidential election results for Rhode Island
Year	Republican / Whig		Democratic		Third party(ies)	
Year	No.	%	No.	%	No.	%
1824	2,145	91.47%	0	0.00%	200	8.53%
1828	2,754	77.03%	821	22.97%	0	0.00%
1832	2,810	56.93%	2,126	43.07%	0	0.00%
1836	2,710	47.76%	2,964	52.24%	0	0.00%
1840	5,278	61.22%	3,301	38.29%	42	0.49%
1844	7,322	59.55%	4,867	39.58%	107	0.87%
1848	6,779	60.77%	3,646	32.68%	730	6.54%
1852	7,626	44.85%	8,735	51.37%	644	3.79%
1856	11,467	57.85%	6,680	33.70%	1,675	8.45%
1860	12,244	61.37%	7,707	38.63%	0	0.00%
1864	13,962	62.24%	8,470	37.76%	0	0.00%
1868	12,993	66.49%	6,548	33.51%	0	0.00%
1872	13,665	71.94%	5,329	28.06%	0	0.00%
1876	15,787	59.29%	10,712	40.23%	128	0.48%
1880	18,195	62.24%	10,779	36.87%	261	0.89%
1884	19,030	58.07%	12,391	37.81%	1,350	4.12%
1888	21,969	53.88%	17,530	42.99%	1,276	3.13%
1892	26,975	50.71%	24,336	45.75%	1,885	3.54%
1896	37,437	68.33%	14,459	26.39%	2,889	5.27%
1900	33,784	59.74%	19,812	35.04%	2,952	5.22%
1904	41,605	60.60%	24,839	36.18%	2,212	3.22%
1908	43,942	60.76%	24,706	34.16%	3,669	5.07%
1912	27,703	35.56%	30,412	39.04%	19,779	25.39%
1916	44,858	51.08%	40,394	46.00%	2,564	2.92%
1920	107,463	63.97%	55,062	32.78%	5,456	3.25%
1924	125,286	59.63%	76,606	36.46%	8,223	3.91%
1928	117,522	49.55%	118,973	50.16%	699	0.29%
1932	115,266	43.31%	146,604	55.08%	4,300	1.62%
1936	125,031	40.18%	165,238	53.10%	20,909	6.72%
1940	138,653	43.17%	182,182	56.73%	313	0.10%
1944	123,487	41.26%	175,356	58.59%	433	0.14%
1948	135,787	41.44%	188,736	57.59%	3,179	0.97%
1952	210,935	50.89%	203,293	49.05%	270	0.07%
1956	225,819	58.23%	161,970	41.77%	2	0.00%
1960	147,502	36.37%	258,032	63.63%	1	0.00%
1964	74,615	19.13%	315,463	80.87%	13	0.00%
1968	122,359	31.78%	246,518	64.03%	16,123	4.19%
1972	220,383	53.00%	194,645	46.81%	780	0.19%
1976	181,249	44.08%	227,636	55.36%	2,285	0.56%
1980	154,793	37.20%	198,342	47.67%	62,937	15.13%
1984	212,080	51.66%	197,106	48.02%	1,306	0.32%
1988	177,761	43.93%	225,123	55.64%	1,736	0.43%
1992	131,601	29.02%	213,299	47.04%	108,578	23.94%
1996	104,683	26.82%	233,050	59.71%	52,551	13.46%
2000	130,555	31.91%	249,508	60.99%	29,049	7.10%
2004	169,046	38.67%	259,760	59.42%	8,328	1.91%
2008	165,391	35.06%	296,571	62.86%	9,804	2.08%
2012	157,204	35.24%	279,677	62.70%	9,168	2.06%
2016	180,543	38.90%	252,525	54.41%	31,076	6.70%
2020	199,922	38.61%	307,486	59.39%	10,349	2.00%
2024	214,406	41.76%	285,156	55.54%	13,824	2.69%

Rhode Island's population barely crosses the threshold beyond the minimum of three for additional votes in both the federal House of Representatives and Electoral College; it is well represented relative to its population, with the eighth-highest number of electoral votes and second-highest number of House Representatives per resident. Based on its area, Rhode Island has the highest density of electoral votes of any state.

Federally, Rhode Island is a reliably Democratic state during presidential elections, usually supporting the Democratic presidential nominee. The state voted for the Republican presidential candidate until 1908. Since then, it has voted for the Republican nominee for president seven times, and the Democratic nominee 17 times. The last 16 presidential elections in Rhode Island have resulted in the Democratic Party winning the Ocean State's Electoral College votes 12 times. In the 1980 presidential election, Rhode Island was one of six states to vote against Republican Ronald Reagan. Reagan was the last Republican to win any of the state's counties in a Presidential election until Donald Trump won Kent County in 2016. In 1988, George H. W. Bush won nearly 44% of the state's popular vote, something no Republican did until 2024, when Donald Trump won nearly 42% of the vote.

Rhode Island was the Democrats' leading state in 1960, 1964, 1968, 1988 and 2000, and second-best in 1968, 1972, 1996, and 2004. Rhode Island's most one-sided Presidential election result was in 1964, with over 80% of Rhode Island's votes going for Lyndon B. Johnson. In 2004, Rhode Island gave John Kerry more than a 20-percentage-point margin of victory (the third-highest of any state), with 59.4% of its vote. All but three of Rhode Island's 39 cities and towns voted for the Democratic candidate. The exceptions were East Greenwich, West Greenwich, and Scituate. In 2008, Rhode Island gave Barack Obama a 28-percentage-point margin of victory (the third-highest of any state), with 63% of its vote. All but one of Rhode Island's 39 cities and towns voted for the Democratic candidate (the exception being Scituate).

In a 2020 study, Rhode Island was ranked as the 19th easiest state for citizens to vote in.

Party registration as of June 2025:
Party	Total voters	Percentage
Unaffiliated	369,484	49.53%
Democratic	267,947	35.91%
Republican	108,531	14.54%
Total	745,962	100.00%

== Legislation and taxes ==
Rhode Island is one of 21 states that have abolished capital punishment; it was second to do so, just after Michigan, and carried out its last execution in the 1840s. Rhode Island was the second to last state to make prostitution illegal. Until November 2009 Rhode Island law made prostitution legal provided it took place indoors. In a 2009 study Rhode Island was listed as the 9th safest state in the country.

In 2011, Rhode Island became the third state in the United States to pass legislation to allow the use of medical marijuana. On May 25, 2022, Rhode Island fully legalized recreational use of marijuana, becoming the nineteenth state to do so. Additionally, the Rhode Island General Assembly passed legislation that allowed civil unions which Governor Lincoln Chafee signed into law on July 2, 2011. Rhode Island became the eighth state to fully recognize either same-sex marriage or civil unions. Same-sex marriage became legal on May 2, 2013, and took effect August 1.

Rhode Island has some of the highest taxes in the country, particularly its property taxes, ranking seventh in local and state taxes, and sixth in real estate taxes.

== Notable people ==
- Thomas Angell (1618–1694) – co-founder of the Colony of Rhode Island and Providence Plantations
- Joshua Babcock (1707–1783) – physician, American Revolution general, state Supreme Court justice, and postmaster
- John Clarke (1609–1676) – Baptist minister, co-founder of the Colony of Rhode Island and Providence Plantations, author of its influential charter, and a leading advocate of religious freedom in America
- William Coddington (1601–1678) – magistrate of the Colony of Rhode Island and Providence Plantations, Judge of Portsmouth, Judge of Newport, Governor of Portsmouth and Newport, Deputy Governor of the entire colony, and governor of the colony
- William Ellery (1727–1820) – a signer of the United States Declaration of Independence as a representative of Rhode Island
- Samuel Gorton (1593–1677) – settled Warwick
- Nathanael Greene (1742–1786) – Continental Army officer, considered George Washington's most gifted officer
- Esek Hopkins (1718–1802) – Commander in Chief of the Continental Navy during the American Revolutionary War
- Stephen Hopkins (1707–1785) – Governor of Rhode Island, RI Supreme Court justice, signatory of the Declaration of Independence
- Anne Hutchinson (1591–1643) – early settler of Newport, the catalyst of the Antinomian Controversy
- H. P. Lovecraft (1890–1937) – author
- Oliver Hazard Perry (1785–1819) naval commander and hero of the War of 1812, the best-known and most prominent member of the Perry family naval dynasty
- Samuel Slater (1768–1835) – industrialist, "father of the industrial revolution"
- Gilbert Stuart (1755–1828) – painter, one of America's foremost portraitists
- James Mitchell Varnum (1748–1789) – general in the Continental Army during the American Revolutionary War
- Samuel Ward (1725–1776) – Supreme Court justice, Governor of the Colony of Rhode Island and Providence Plantations, and a delegate to the Continental Congress
- Samuel Ward Jr. (1756–1832) – American Revolutionary War soldier and delegate to the secessionist Hartford Convention
- Roger Williams (1603–1684) – founder of the Colony of Rhode Island and Providence Plantations, influential author, considered the first proponent of separation of church and state
- Abraham Whipple (1733–1819) – Continental Navy commander-in-chief

== See also ==
- Index of Rhode Island-related articles
- Outline of Rhode Island

== General bibliography ==
=== Primary sources ===
- Dwight, Timothy (1821). Travels; in New-England and New-York. 4 vol. Online at: vol. 1; vol. 2; vol. 3; vol. 4.
- McPhetres, S. A. (1868). A Political Manual for the Campaign of 1868, for Use in the New England States, Containing the Population and Latest Election Returns of Every Town (Archived July 28, 2020, at the Wayback Machine)
- Rhode Island's Geography and Climate

=== Secondary sources ===
- Adams, James Truslow (1921). The Founding of New England.
- Adams, James Truslow (1923). Revolutionary New England, 1691–1776.
- Adams, James Truslow (1926). New England in the Republic, 1776–1850.
- Andrews, Charles M. (1919). The Fathers of New England: A Chronicle of the Puritan Commonwealths. Short survey by leading scholar.
- Axtell, James, ed. (1973). The American People in Colonial New England. Social history.
- Brewer, Daniel Chauncey (1926). Conquest of New England by the Immigrant.
- Coleman, Peter J. (1963). The Transformation of Rhode Island, 1790–1860.
- Conforti, Joseph A. (2001). Imagining New England: Explorations of Regional Identity from the Pilgrims to the Mid-Twentieth Century.
- Dennison, George M. (1976) The Dorr War: Republicanism on Trial, 1831–1861.
- Hall, Donald, ed. (2005). Encyclopedia of New England.
- Karlsen, Carol F. (1998). The Devil in the Shape of a Woman: Witchcraft in Colonial New England.
- Lovejoy, David S. (1969). Rhode Island Politics and the American Revolution, 1760–1776.
- McLaughlin, William (1976). Rhode Island: A Bicentennial History.
- Moondancer & Strong Woman (2007). "Cultural History of the Native Peoples of Southern New England". Bauu Press.
- Palfrey, John Gorham (1859–90). History of New England (Archived July 28, 2020, at the Wayback Machine; 5 vol.).
- "Slavery in Rhode Island". Slavery in the North. Archived from the original on April 19, 2012.
- Sletcher, Michael (2004). New England.
- Stephenson, Nathaniel Wright (1930). Nelson W. Aldrich, a Leader in American Politics.
- Works Progress Administration (1939). Guide to Rhode Island.
- Zimmerman, Joseph F. (1999). The New England Town Meeting: Democracy in Action (Archived November 23, 2011, at the Wayback Machine).

Preceded by North Carolina	List of U.S. states by date of admission to the Union; Ratified Constitution on May 29, 1790 (13th)	Succeeded by Vermont
