= 1876 United States presidential election in Rhode Island =

- November 7, 1876
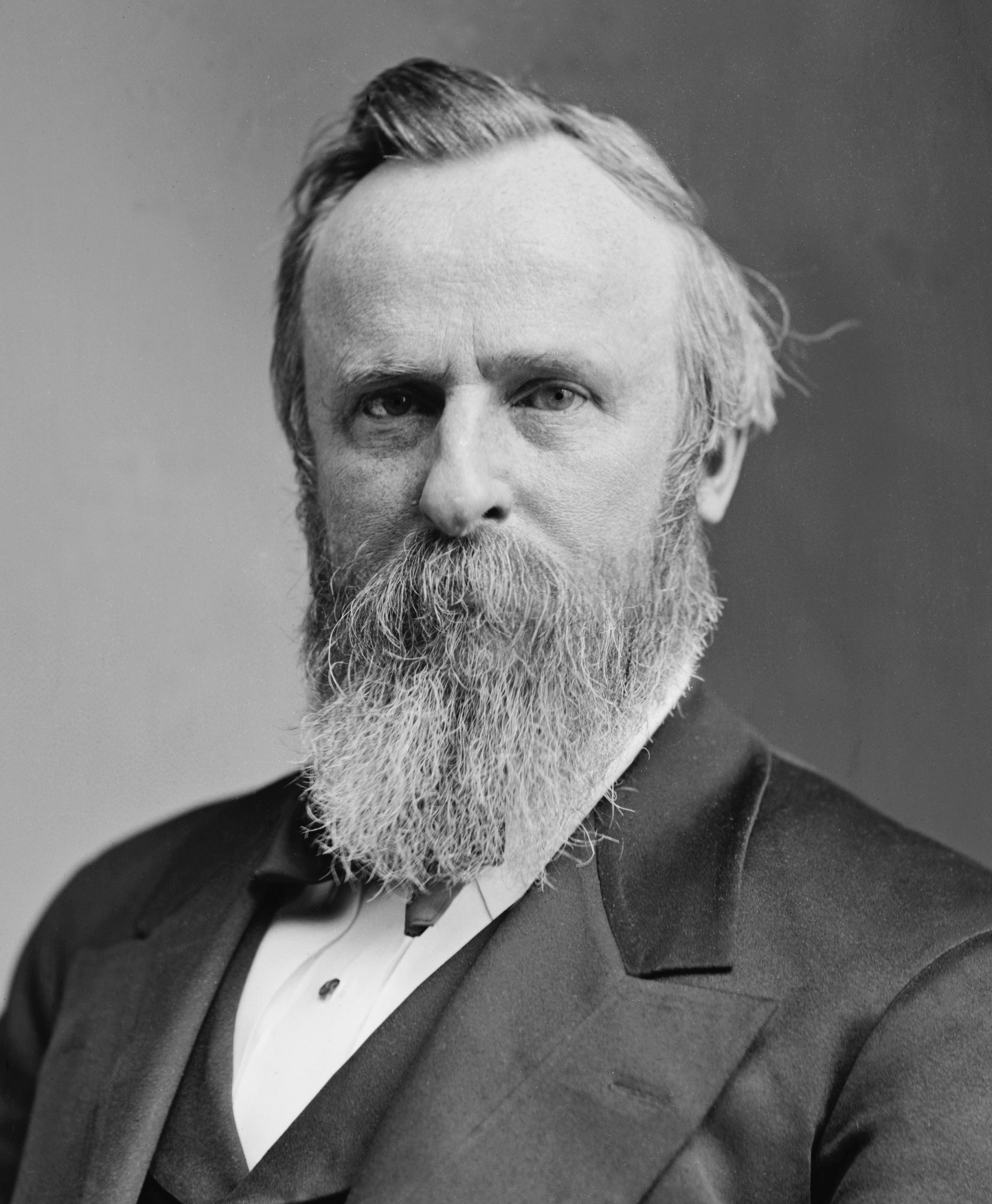

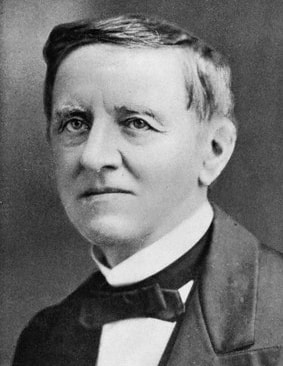
Nominee	Rutherford B. Hayes	Samuel J. Tilden
Party	Republican	Democratic
Home state	Ohio	New York
Running mate	William A. Wheeler	Thomas A. Hendricks
Electoral vote	4	0
Popular vote	15,787	10,712
Percentage	59.29%	40.23%

Hayes
50–60%
60–70%
70–80%
80–90%
Tilden
40–50%
50–60%
70–80%
President before election
Ulysses S. Grant
Republican
Elected President
Rutherford B. Hayes
Republican

The 1876 United States presidential election in Rhode Island took place on November 7, 1876, as part of the 1876 United States presidential election. Voters chose four representatives, or electors to the Electoral College, who voted for president and vice president.

Rhode Island voted for the Republican nominee, Rutherford B. Hayes, over the Democratic nominee, Samuel J. Tilden. Hayes won the state by a margin of 19.06%.

With 59.29% of the popular vote, Rhode Island would be Hayes' fourth strongest victory in terms of percentage in the popular vote after Vermont, Nebraska and Kansas.

This was the only election between 1860 and 1888 in which the Democratic candidate earned more than 40% statewide, as well as the only election in the same period in which the Democratic candidate earned more than 40% in at least one Rhode Island county.

== Results ==
1876 United States presidential election in Rhode Island
Party	Candidate	Running mate	Popular vote		Electoral vote	
Party	Candidate	Running mate	Count	%	Count	%
Republican	Rutherford B. Hayes of Ohio	William A. Wheeler of New York	15,787	59.29%	4	100.00%
Democratic	Samuel J. Tilden of New York	Thomas A. Hendricks of Indiana	10,712	40.23%	0	0.00%
Greenback	Peter Cooper of New York	Samuel Fenton Cary of Ohio	68	0.26%	0	0.00%
Prohibition	Green Clay Smith of Kentucky	Gideon Tabor Stewart of Ohio	60	0.23%	0	0.00%
Total			26,627	100.00%	4	100.00%

== See also ==
- United States presidential elections in Rhode Island
