= 1872 United States presidential election in Rhode Island =

- November 5, 1872
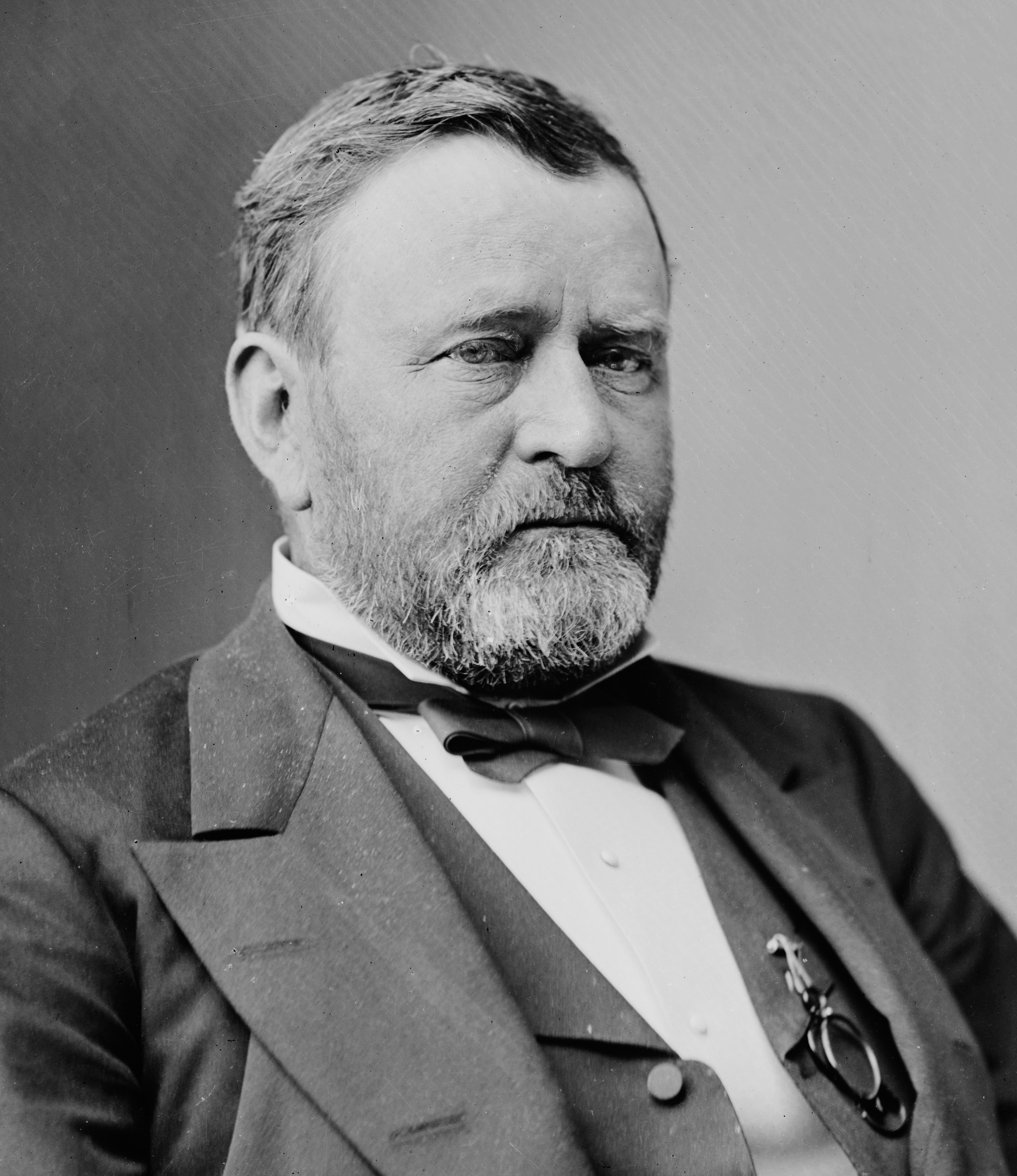

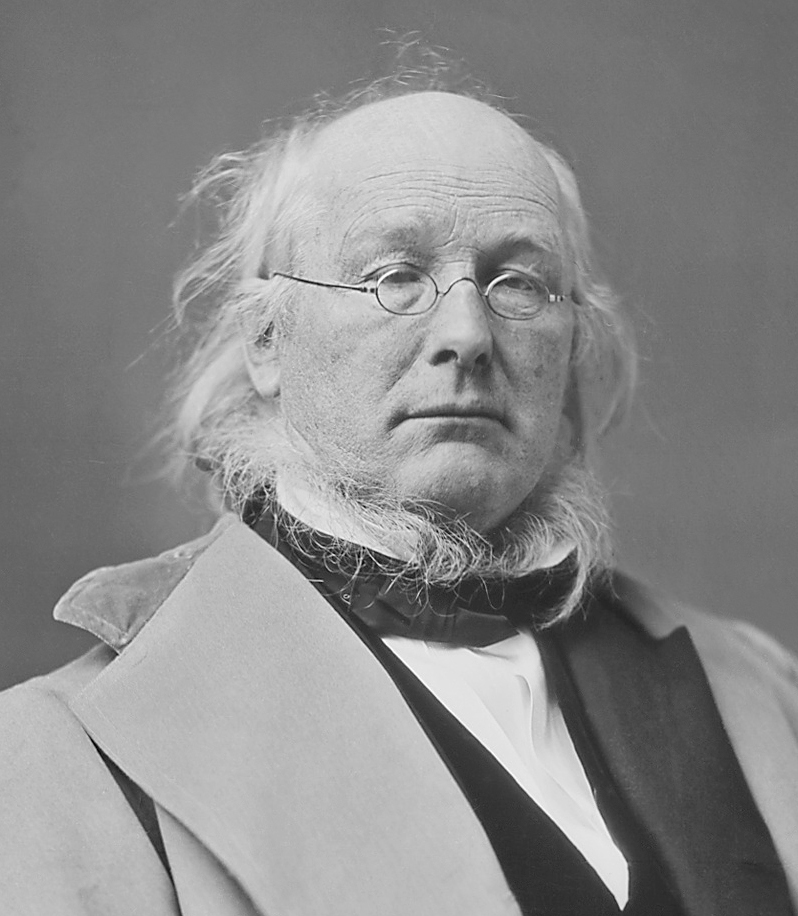
Nominee	Ulysses S. Grant	Horace Greeley
Party	Republican	Liberal Republican
Home state	Illinois	New York
Running mate	Henry Wilson	Benjamin G. Brown
Electoral vote	4	0
Popular vote	13,665	5,329
Percentage	71.94%	28.06%
County results
Grant
60–70%
70–80%
President before election
Ulysses S. Grant
Republican
Elected President
Ulysses S. Grant
Republican

The 1872 United States presidential election in Rhode Island took place on November 5, 1872. All contemporary 37 states were part of the 1872 United States presidential election. The state voters chose four electors to the Electoral College, which selected the president and vice president.

Rhode Island was won by the Republican nominees, incumbent President Ulysses S. Grant of Illinois and his running mate Senator Henry Wilson of Massachusetts. Grant and Wilson defeated the Liberal Republican and Democratic nominees, former Congressman Horace Greeley of New York and his running mate former Senator and Governor Benjamin Gratz Brown of Missouri by a margin of 43.88%.

With 71.94% of the popular vote, Rhode Island would be Grant's third strongest victory in terms of percentage in the popular vote after Vermont and South Carolina. It remains the best Republican performance in Rhode Island's history and the second-best by any candidate since the formation of the Democratic party in 1828 after Lyndon B. Johnson’s 80.87% in 1964.

== Results ==
1872 United States presidential election in Rhode Island
Party	Candidate	Running mate	Popular vote		Electoral vote	
Party	Candidate	Running mate	Count	%	Count	%
Republican	Ulysses S. Grant of Illinois	Henry Wilson of Massachusetts	13,665	71.94%	4	100.00%
Liberal Republican	Horace Greeley of New York	Benjamin Gratz Brown of Missouri	5,329	28.06%	0	0.00%
Total			18,994	100.00%	4	100.00%

== See also ==
- United States presidential elections in Rhode Island
