= 1800 United States presidential election in Rhode Island =

- October 31 – December 3, 1800
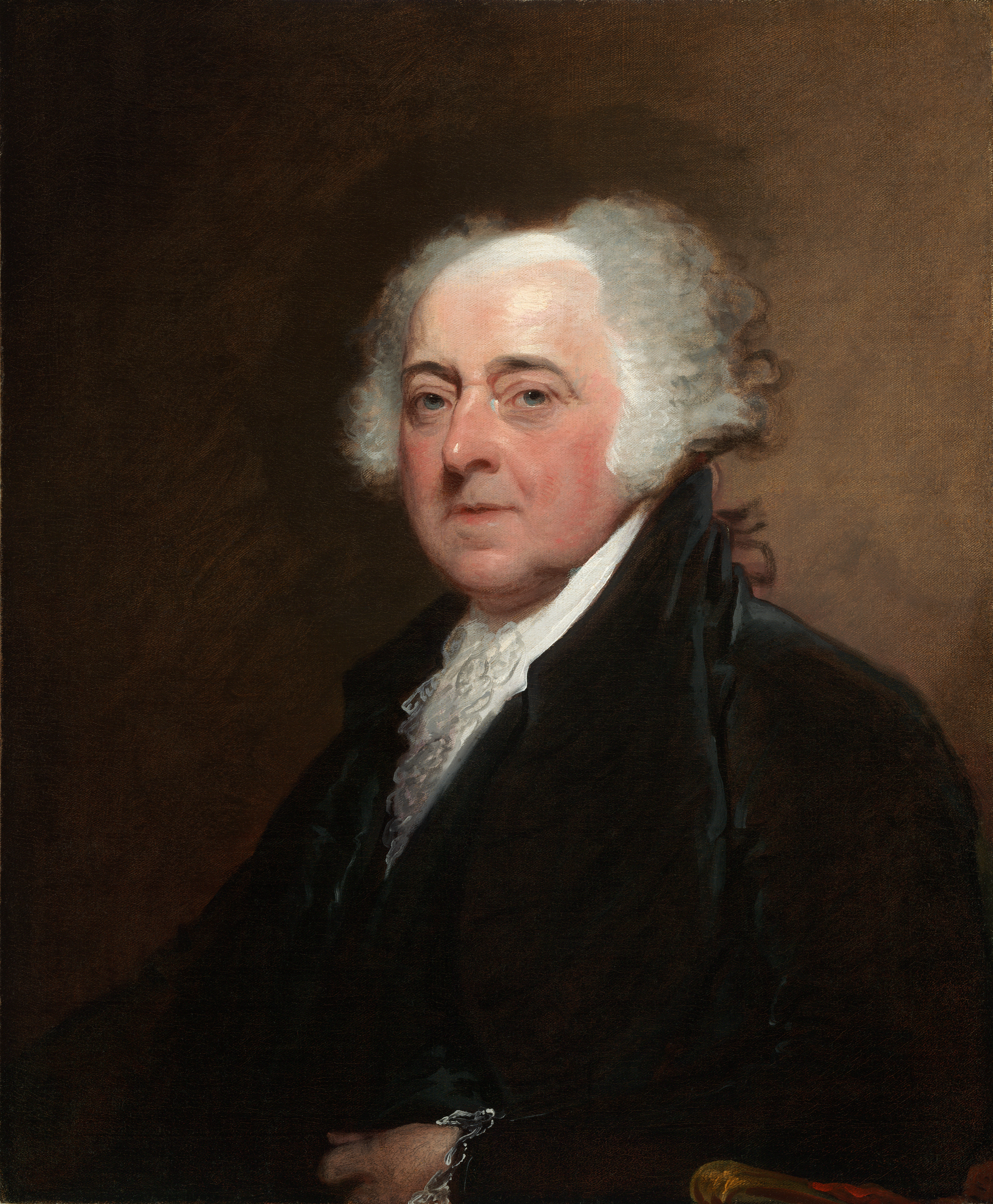

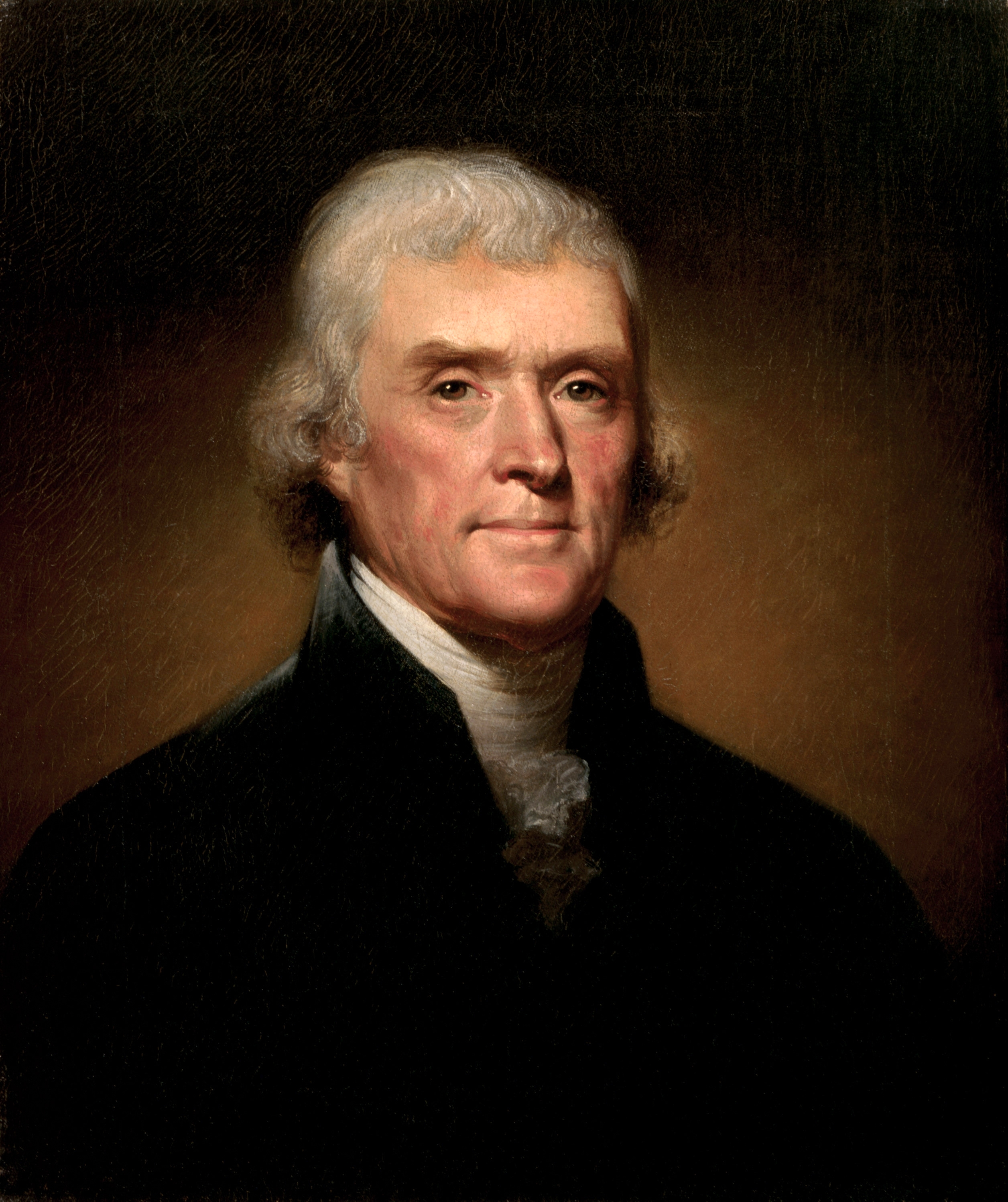

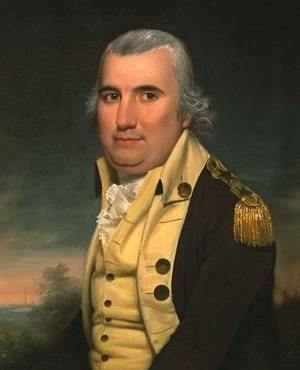

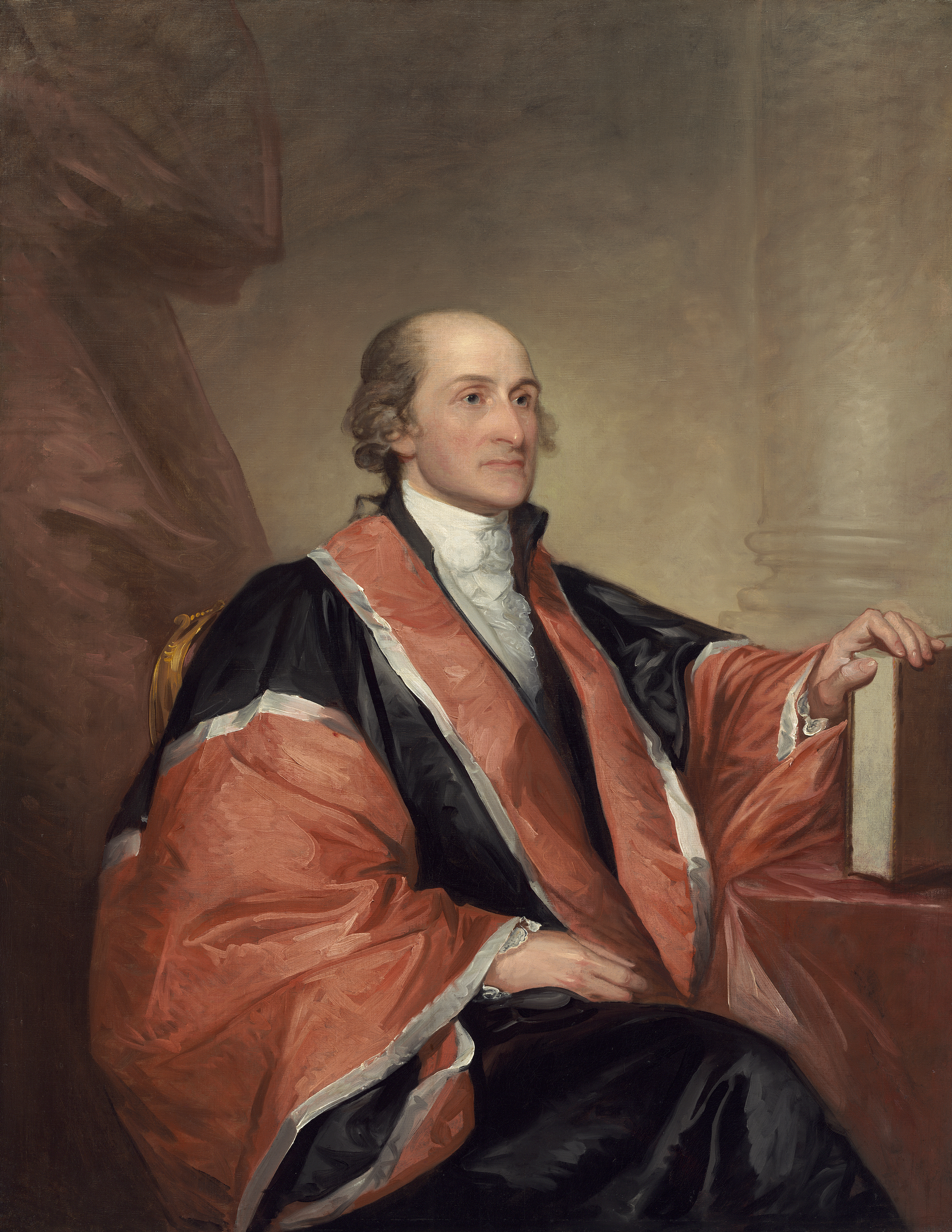
Nominee	John Adams	Thomas Jefferson
Party	Federalist	Democratic-Republican
Home state	Massachusetts	Virginia
Electoral vote	4	0
Popular vote	2,353	2,159
Percentage	52.15%	47.85%
Nominee	Charles Cotesworth Pinckney	John Jay
Party	Federalist	Federalist
Home state	South Carolina	New York
Electoral vote	3	1

Adams
50–60%
60–70%
70–80%
80-90%
90-100%
Jefferson
50–60%
60–70%
70-80%
80-90%
90-100%
President before election
John Adams
Federalist
Elected President
Thomas Jefferson
Democratic-Republican

A presidential election was held in Rhode Island between October 31 and December 3, 1800, as part of the 1800 United States presidential election. Voters chose four representatives, or electors, to the Electoral College who voted for president and vice president.

Rhode Island voted for the Federalist candidate, John Adams, over the Democratic-Republican candidate, Thomas Jefferson. Adams won Rhode Island by a margin of 4.3%. All four Adams electors received more votes than the four Jefferson electors and the electoral vote was all for Adams in Rhode Island. Adams’s running mate Charles Cotesworth Pinckney received three electoral votes, and John Jay received one electoral vote. Rhode Island was the only state in the election of 1800 in which an elector “threw away” a vote by not voting for both candidates on a party’s ticket.

== Results ==
1800 United States presidential election in Rhode Island
Party	Candidate	Votes	Percentage	Electoral votes
Federalist	John Adams (incumbent)	2,353	52.15%	4
Democratic-Republican	Thomas Jefferson	2,159	47.85%	0
Totals		4,512	100.0%	4

=== Results by county ===
1800 United States presidential election in Rhode Island
County	John Adams Federalist		Thomas Jefferson Democratic-Republican		Margin		Total votes
County	#	%	#	%	#	%	Total votes
Bristol	213	75.27%	70	24.73%	143	50.54%	283
Kent	359	63.20%	209	36.80%	150	26.40%	568
Newport	454	45.81%	537	54.19%	-83	-8.38%	991
Providence	1,008	56.53%	775	43.47%	233	13.06%	1,783
Washington	311	35.79%	558	64.21%	-247	-28.42%	869
Total	2,345	52.18%	2,149	47.82%	196	4.36%	4,494

== See also ==
- United States presidential elections in Rhode Island
