= 1844 United States presidential election in Rhode Island =

- November 6, 1844
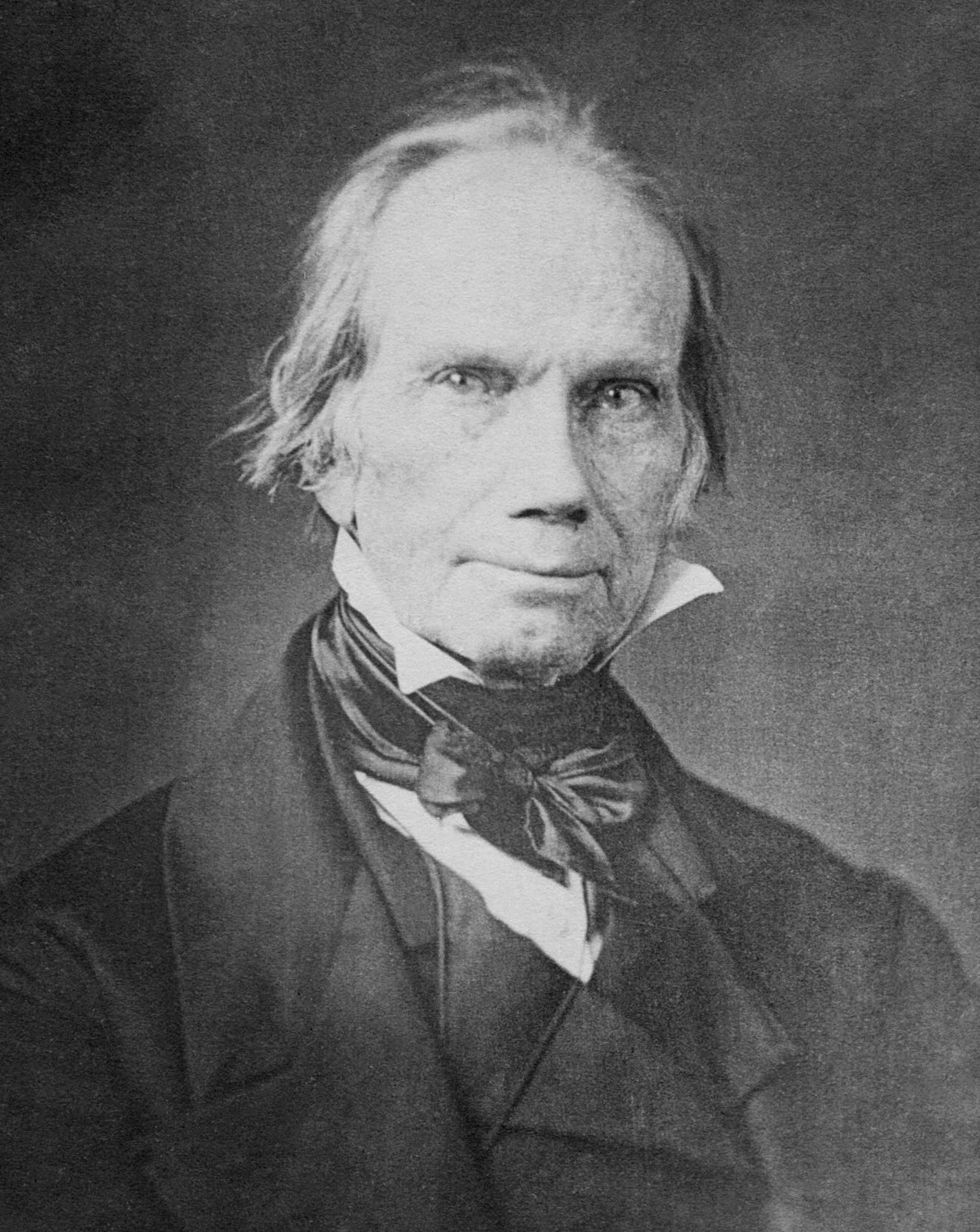

Nominee	Henry Clay	James K. Polk
Party	Whig	Democratic
Home state	Kentucky	Tennessee
Running mate	Theodore Frelinghuysen	George M. Dallas
Electoral vote	4	0
Popular vote	7,322	4,867
Percentage	59.55%	39.58%
County results
Clay
50–60%
60–70%
70–80%
80–90%
President before election
John Tyler
Independent
Elected President
James K. Polk
Democratic

A presidential election was held in Rhode Island on November 6, 1844, as part of the 1844 United States presidential election. Voters chose four representatives, or electors to the Electoral College, who voted for President and Vice President.

Rhode Island voted for the Whig candidate, Henry Clay, over Democratic candidate James K. Polk. Clay won Rhode Island by a margin of 19.97%.

With 59.55% of the popular vote, Rhode Island would prove to be Henry Clay's strongest state in the nation.

== Results ==
1844 United States presidential election in Rhode Island
Party	Candidate	Running mate	Popular vote		Electoral vote	
Party	Candidate	Running mate	Count	%	Count	%
Whig	Henry Clay of Kentucky	Theodore Frelinghuysen of New York	7,322	59.55%	4	100.00%
Democratic	James K. Polk of Tennessee	George M. Dallas of Pennsylvania	4,867	39.58%	0	0.00%
Liberty	James G. Birney of Michigan	Thomas Morris of Ohio	107	0.87%	0	0.00%
Total			12,296	100.00%	4	100.00%

== See also ==
- United States presidential elections in Rhode Island
