= 1836 United States presidential election in Rhode Island =

- November 23, 1836
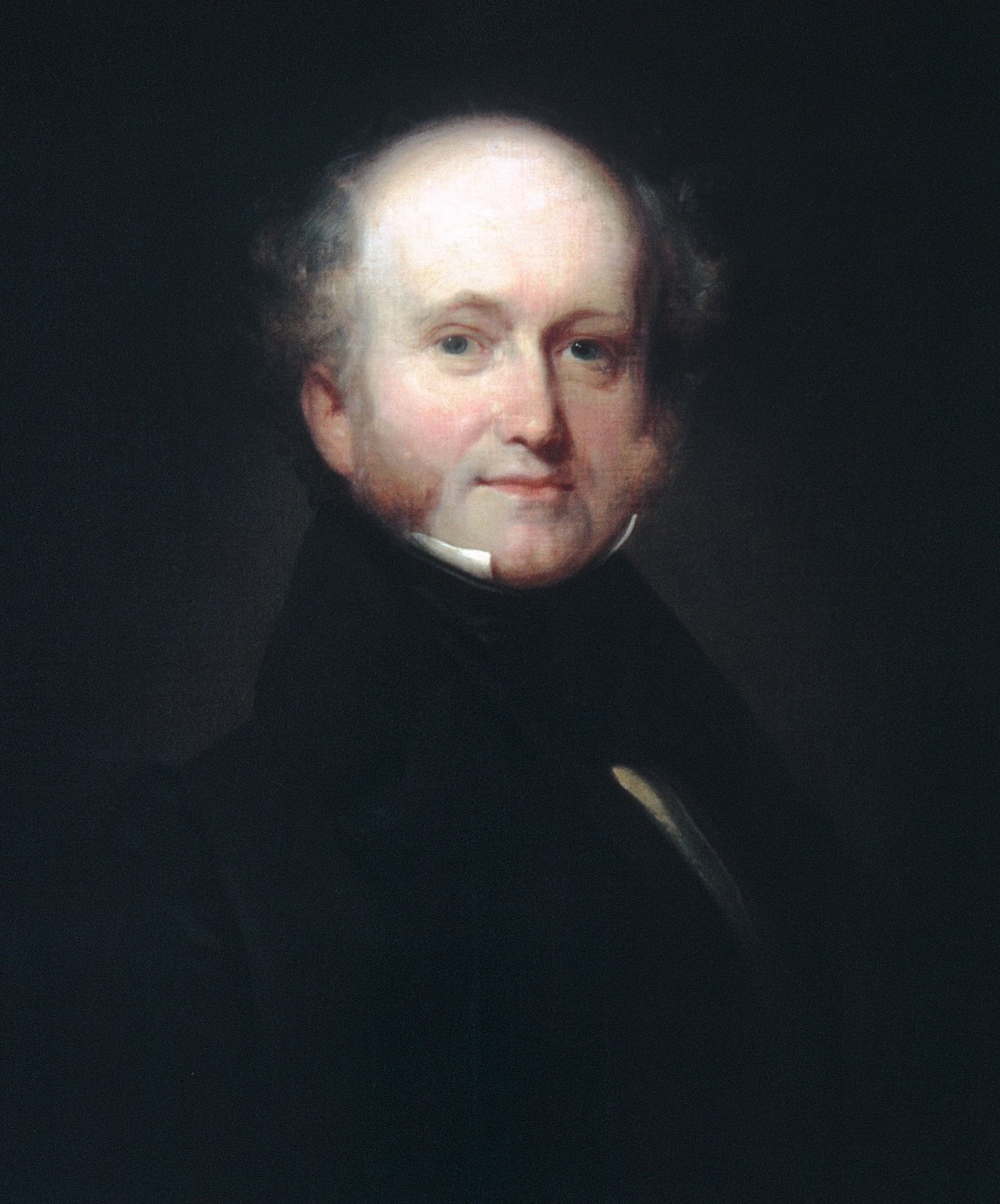

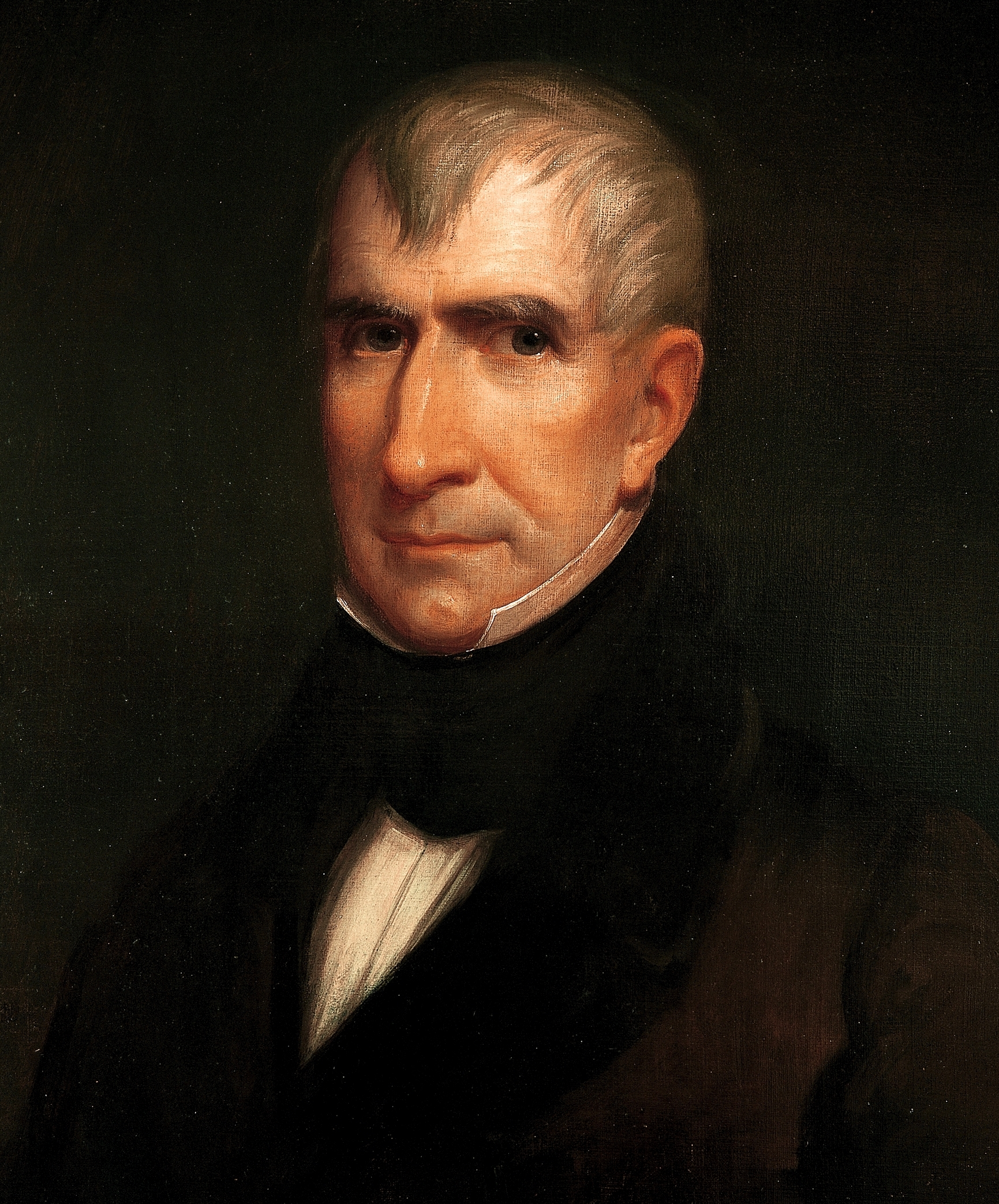
Nominee	Martin Van Buren	William Henry Harrison
Party	Democratic	Whig
Home state	New York	Ohio
Running mate	Richard Mentor Johnson	Francis Granger
Electoral vote	4	0
Popular vote	2,964	2,710
Percentage	52.24%	47.76%
County results
Van Buren
50–60%
Harrison
50–60%
President before election
Andrew Jackson
Democratic
Elected President
Martin Van Buren
Democratic

A presidential election was held in Rhode Island on November 23, 1836 as part of the 1836 United States presidential election. Voters chose four representatives, or electors to the Electoral College, who voted for President and Vice President.

Rhode Island voted for Democratic candidate Martin Van Buren over Whig candidate William Henry Harrison. Van Buren won Rhode Island by a narrow margin of 4.48%.

This was the first time that Rhode Island ever voted for a Democratic presidential candidate, and Van Buren's performance would not be bettered by a Democrat in Rhode Island until Franklin D. Roosevelt in 1932.

== Results ==
1836 United States presidential election in Rhode Island
Party	Candidate	Running mate	Popular vote		Electoral vote	
Party	Candidate	Running mate	Count	%	Count	%
Democratic	Martin Van Buren of New York	Richard Mentor Johnson of Kentucky	2,964	52.24%	4	100.00%
Whig	William Henry Harrison of Ohio	Francis Granger of New York	2,710	47.76%	0	0.00%
Total			5,674	100.00%	4	100.00%

== See also ==
- United States presidential elections in Rhode Island
