= 1924 United States presidential election in Rhode Island =

- November 4, 1924

Nominee	Calvin Coolidge	John W. Davis
Party	Republican	Democratic
Home state	Massachusetts	West Virginia
Running mate	Charles G. Dawes	Charles W. Bryan
Electoral vote	5	0
Popular vote	125,286	76,606
Percentage	59.63%	36.46%

Coolidge
50–60%
60–70%
70–80%
80–90%
90–100%
Davis
40–50%
50–60%
President before election
Calvin Coolidge
Republican
Elected President
Calvin Coolidge
Republican

The 1924 United States presidential election in Rhode Island took place on November 4, 1924, as part of the 1924 United States presidential election which was held throughout all contemporary 48 states. Voters chose five representatives, or electors to the Electoral College, who voted for president and vice president.

Rhode Island voted for the Republican nominee, incumbent President Calvin Coolidge of Massachusetts, over the Democratic nominee, Ambassador John W. Davis of West Virginia. Coolidge ran with former Budget Director Charles G. Dawes of Illinois, while Davis ran with Governor Charles W. Bryan of Nebraska. Also in the running that year was the Progressive Party nominee, Senator Robert M. La Follette of Wisconsin and his running mate Senator Burton K. Wheeler of Montana. La Follette's support base was primarily among rural German and Scandinavian Americans, particularly German Catholics, and he possessed little appeal in the Northeast outside a few New York and Boston anti-Prohibition precincts despite the area's large Catholic population. This was especially true in Rhode Island where La Follette's opposition to the League of Nations was severely unpopular, and consequently Rhode Island was La Follette's sixth-weakest state and weakest outside the former Confederacy where the lower classes were almost entirely disfranchised.

Coolidge won Rhode Island by a margin of 23.17%. His victory was spurred on by a personal popularity which helped him in the state and the rest of New England. Many New Englanders felt that Coolidge represented the values of New England; he was born in the town of Plymouth Notch, Vermont, and established his political career nearby as Governor of Massachusetts. Thus Coolidge remained popular with voters across the New England region.

The 1920s were a fiercely Republican decade in American politics, and Rhode Island in that era was a fiercely Republican state in presidential elections. The economic boom and social good feelings of the Roaring Twenties under popular Republican leadership virtually guaranteed Calvin Coolidge an easy win in the state against the conservative Southern Democrat Davis. Davis' status as the solitary pro-League of Nations candidate helped him in Rhode Island with its large immigrant population. Consequently, Davis gained almost 4% on Cox's 1920 vote and in fact Rhode Island was his third strongest state in the North and West (behind New Mexico and Indiana), giving Davis a vote percentage 7.64% above his national figure.

In effect, Davis’ gain would begin Rhode Island's transition from a strongly Yankee Republican state into a Democratic-leaning state, made definitive via Catholic Al Smith’s win 4 years later. Rhode Island would not vote for another Republican presidential candidate until Dwight D. Eisenhower in 1952, and since 1924, Republicans have only carried the state four times. To date, this was the last time that the state's capital and largest city, Providence, voted Republican.

== Results ==
1924 United States presidential election in Rhode Island
Party	Candidate	Running mate	Popular vote		Electoral vote	
Party	Candidate	Running mate	Count	%	Count	%
Republican	Calvin Coolidge of Massachusetts	Charles G. Dawes of Illinois	125,286	59.63%	5	100.00%
Democratic	John W. Davis of West Virginia	Charles W. Bryan of Nebraska	76,606	36.46%	0	0.00%
Progressive	Robert M. La Follette of Wisconsin	Burton K. Wheeler of Montana	7,628	3.63%	0	0.00%
Communist	William Z. Foster of Massachusetts	Benjamin Gitlow of New York	289	0.14%	0	0.00%
Socialist Labor	Frank T. Johns of Oregon	Verne L. Reynolds of New York	268	0.13%	0	0.00%
N/A	Others	Others	38	0.02%	0	0.00%
Total			210,115	100.00%	5	100.00%

=== By county ===
County	Calvin Coolidge Republican		John Davis Democratic		Other candidates Various parties		Total
County	%	#	%	#	%	#	#
Bristol	60.6%	4,076	37.2%	2,500	2.3%	153	6,729
Kent	65.8%	11,100	32.2%	5,429	2.0%	331	16,860
Newport	67.2%	9,608	27.8%	3,975	4.9%	706	14,289
Providence	57.2%	92,464	38.6%	62,336	4.2%	6,750	161,550
Washington	75.2%	8,038	22.1%	2,366	2.6%	283	10,687

=== Results by town ===
Town	Calvin Coolidge Republican		John W. Davis Democratic		Robert M. La Follette Progressive		William Z. Foster Workers		Frank T. Johns Socialist Labor		William Wallace Commonwealth Land		Margin		Total votes cast
Town	#	%	#	%	#	%	#	%	#	%	#	%	#	%	Total votes cast
Barrington	1,239	82.71%	239	15.95%	20	1.34%	0	0.00%	0	0.00%	0	0.00%	1,000	66.76%	1,498
Bristol	1,602	53.52%	1,313	43.87%	74	2.47%	2	0.07%	1	0.03%	1	0.03%	289	9.66%	2,993
Burrillville	1,590	51.47%	1,363	44.12%	131	4.24%	3	0.10%	2	0.06%	0	0.00%	227	7.35%	3,089
Central Falls	2,906	42.88%	3,683	54.35%	173	2.55%	10	0.15%	5	0.07%	0	0.00%	-777	-11.47%	6,777
Charlestown	367	83.79%	59	13.47%	12	2.74%	0	0.00%	0	0.00%	0	0.00%	308	70.32%	438
Coventry	1,735	70.16%	692	27.98%	42	1.70%	2	0.08%	2	0.08%	0	0.00%	1,043	42.18%	2,473
Cranston	8,832	76.52%	2,344	20.31%	331	2.87%	11	0.10%	22	0.19%	2	0.02%	6,488	56.21%	11,542
Cumberland	1,766	46.11%	1,902	49.66%	148	3.86%	10	0.26%	4	0.10%	0	0.00%	-136	-3.55%	3,830
East Greenwich	1,344	78.50%	339	19.80%	28	1.64%	1	0.06%	0	0.00%	0	0.00%	1,005	58.70%	1,712
East Providence	5,962	70.12%	2,249	26.45%	277	3.26%	6	0.07%	5	0.06%	4	0.05%	3,713	43.67%	8,503
Exeter	317	87.09%	41	11.26%	6	1.65%	0	0.00%	0	0.00%	0	0.00%	276	75.82%	364
Foster	415	83.50%	77	15.49%	3	0.60%	0	0.00%	1	0.20%	1	0.20%	338	68.01%	497
Glocester	517	69.21%	219	29.32%	10	1.34%	0	0.00%	1	0.13%	0	0.00%	298	39.89%	747
Hopkinton	959	87.98%	106	9.72%	24	2.20%	1	0.09%	0	0.00%	0	0.00%	853	78.26%	1,090
Jamestown	465	77.50%	109	18.17%	25	4.17%	0	0.00%	1	0.17%	0	0.00%	356	59.33%	600
Johnston	1,595	65.10%	780	31.84%	68	2.78%	1	0.04%	6	0.24%	0	0.00%	815	33.27%	2,450
Lincoln	2,203	57.47%	1,567	40.88%	50	1.30%	3	0.08%	10	0.26%	0	0.00%	636	16.59%	3,833
Little Compton	415	94.97%	20	4.58%	1	0.23%	1	0.23%	0	0.00%	0	0.00%	395	90.39%	437
Middletown	495	87.30%	63	11.11%	9	1.59%	0	0.00%	0	0.00%	0	0.00%	432	76.19%	567
Narragansett	495	75.57%	154	23.51%	5	0.76%	1	0.15%	0	0.00%	0	0.00%	341	52.06%	655
New Shoreham	430	92.87%	32	6.91%	1	0.22%	0	0.00%	0	0.00%	0	0.00%	398	85.96%	463
Newport	6,115	59.43%	3,545	34.45%	607	5.90%	10	0.10%	13	0.13%	0	0.00%	2,570	24.98%	10,290
North Kingstown	1,463	77.82%	373	19.84%	41	2.18%	1	0.05%	2	0.11%	0	0.00%	1,090	57.98%	1,880
North Providence	1,861	60.05%	1,138	36.72%	86	2.78%	6	0.19%	5	0.16%	3	0.10%	723	23.33%	3,099
North Smithfield	680	60.88%	391	35.00%	44	3.94%	1	0.09%	1	0.09%	0	0.00%	289	25.87%	1,117
Pawtucket	13,807	56.76%	9,622	39.56%	814	3.35%	36	0.15%	43	0.18%	3	0.01%	4,185	17.20%	24,325
Portsmouth	558	88.85%	60	9.55%	9	1.43%	1	0.16%	0	0.00%	0	0.00%	498	79.30%	628
Providence	42,063	54.33%	31,667	40.90%	3,431	4.43%	123	0.16%	119	0.15%	23	0.03%	10,396	13.43%	77,426
Richmond	437	76.53%	109	19.09%	24	4.20%	0	0.00%	1	0.18%	0	0.00%	328	57.44%	571
Scituate	1,043	82.13%	205	16.14%	18	1.42%	4	0.31%	0	0.00%	0	0.00%	838	65.98%	1,270
Smithfield	881	64.26%	473	34.50%	16	1.17%	0	0.00%	1	0.07%	0	0.00%	408	29.76%	1,371
South Kingstown	1,712	71.81%	631	26.47%	36	1.51%	4	0.17%	1	0.04%	0	0.00%	1,081	45.34%	2,384
Tiverton	1,130	86.66%	146	11.20%	23	1.76%	1	0.08%	4	0.31%	0	0.00%	984	75.46%	1,304
Warren	1,235	55.18%	948	42.36%	52	2.32%	1	0.04%	1	0.04%	1	0.04%	287	12.82%	2,238
Warwick	5,494	78.17%	1,355	19.28%	163	2.32%	9	0.13%	7	0.10%	0	0.00%	4,139	58.89%	7,028
West Greenwich	146	83.43%	29	16.57%	0	0.00%	0	0.00%	0	0.00%	0	0.00%	117	66.86%	175
West Warwick	2,381	43.51%	3,014	55.08%	73	1.33%	2	0.04%	2	0.04%	0	0.00%	-633	-11.57%	5,472
Westerly	2,288	69.23%	893	27.02%	110	3.33%	5	0.15%	9	0.27%	0	0.00%	1,395	42.21%	3,305
Woonsocket	6,343	54.33%	4,656	39.88%	643	5.51%	12	0.10%	20	0.17%	0	0.00%	1,687	14.45%	11,674
Totals	125,286	59.63%	76,606	36.46%	7,628	3.63%	268	0.13%	289	0.14%	38	0.02%	48,680	23.17%	210,115

== See also ==
- United States presidential elections in Rhode Island
