= 1920 United States presidential election in Rhode Island =

- November 2, 1920
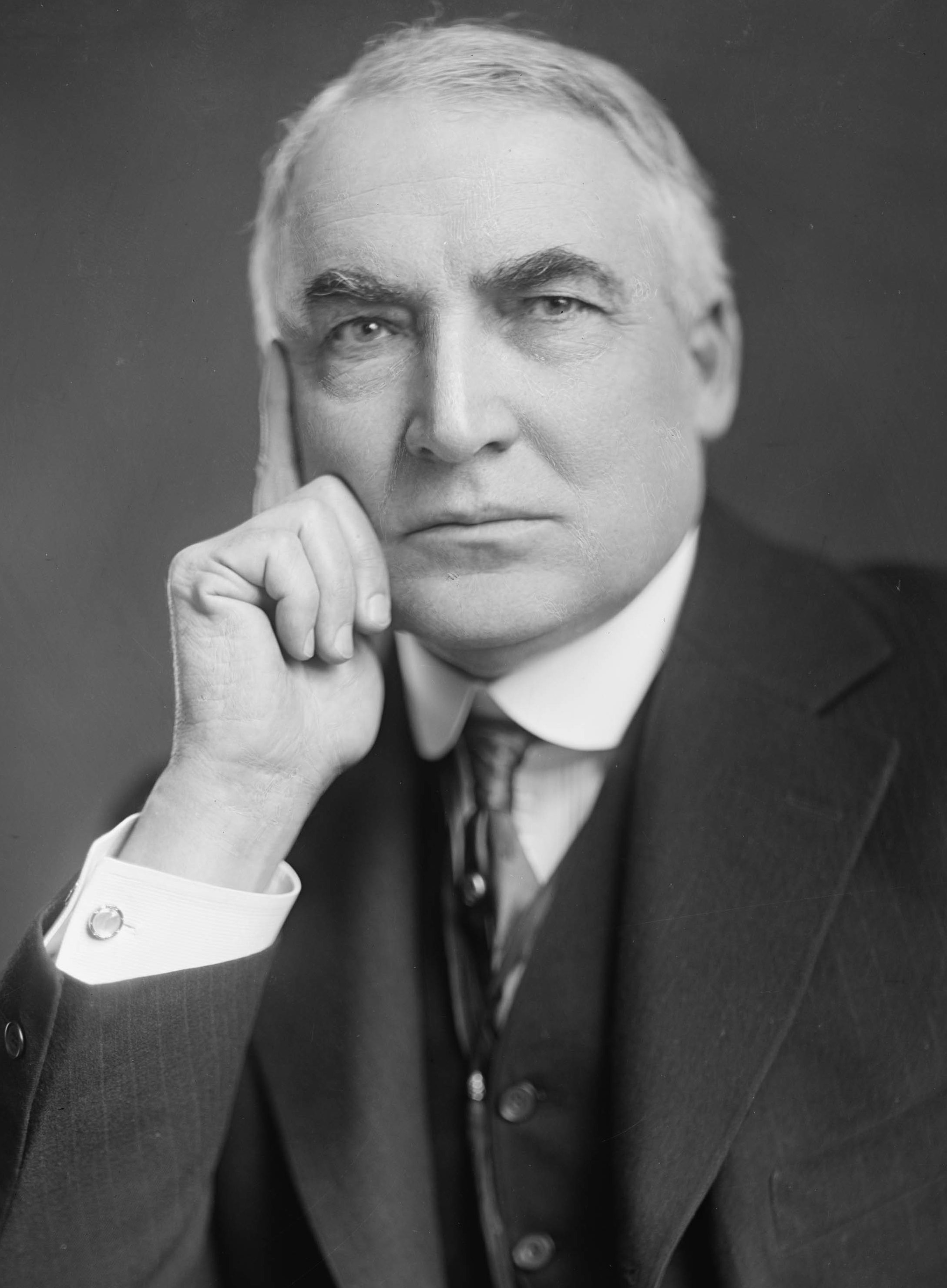

Nominee	Warren G. Harding	James M. Cox
Party	Republican	Democratic
Home state	Ohio	Ohio
Running mate	Calvin Coolidge	Franklin D. Roosevelt
Electoral vote	5	0
Popular vote	107,463	55,062
Percentage	63.97%	32.78%

Harding
50–60%
60–70%
70–80%
80–90%
90–100%
President before election
Woodrow Wilson
Democratic
Elected President
Warren G. Harding
Republican

The 1920 United States presidential election in Rhode Island took place on November 2, 1920, as part of the 1920 United States presidential election which was held throughout all contemporary 48 states. Voters chose five representatives, or electors to the Electoral College, who voted for president and vice president.

Rhode Island voted for Republican nominee, Senator Warren G. Harding of Ohio, over the Democratic nominee, Governor James M. Cox of Ohio. Harding ran with Governor Calvin Coolidge of Massachusetts, while Cox ran with Assistant Secretary of the Navy Franklin D. Roosevelt of New York.

Harding won Rhode Island by a margin of 31.19%. This is the largest margin of victory in a tipping point state in American history. His victory in the New England states was helped in by the local popularity of his running mate, Calvin Coolidge, a traditional New England Yankee born in the small town of Plymouth Notch, Vermont, who had started his political career nearby as Governor of Massachusetts. As of the 2020 United States presidential election, this is the last time a Republican won over sixty percent of the vote in Rhode Island.

== Results ==
1920 United States presidential election in Rhode Island
Party	Candidate	Running mate	Popular vote		Electoral vote	
Party	Candidate	Running mate	Count	%	Count	%
Republican	Warren Gamaliel Harding of Ohio	Calvin Coolidge of Massachusetts	107,463	63.97%	5	100.00%
Democratic	James Middleton Cox of Ohio	Franklin Delano Roosevelt of New York	55,062	32.78%	0	0.00%
Socialist	Eugene Victor Debs of Indiana	Seymour Stedman of Illinois	4,351	2.59%	0	0.00%
Prohibition	Aaron Sherman Watkins of Indiana	David Leigh Colvin of New York	510	0.30%	0	0.00%
Socialist Labor	William Wesley Cox of Missouri	August Gillhaus of New York	495	0.29%	0	0.00%
Single Tax	Robert Colvin Macauley	Richard C. Barnum	100	0.06%	0	0.00%
Total			167,981	100.00%	5	100.00%

=== Results by town ===
Town	Warren G. Harding Republican		James M. Cox Democratic		Eugene V. Debs Socialist		Aaron S. Watkins Prohibition		William W. Cox Socialist Labor		Robert C. Macauley Single Tax		Margin		Total votes cast
Town	#	%	#	%	#	%	#	%	#	%	#	%	#	%	Total votes cast
Barrington	933	80.92%	194	16.83%	6	0.52%	15	1.30%	5	0.43%	0	0.00%	739	64.09%	1,153
Bristol	1,542	62.53%	868	35.20%	39	1.58%	13	0.53%	3	0.12%	1	0.04%	674	27.33%	2,466
Burrillville	1,773	65.02%	884	32.42%	59	2.16%	1	0.04%	8	0.29%	2	0.07%	889	32.60%	2,727
Central Falls	2,886	50.36%	2,734	47.71%	88	1.54%	7	0.12%	13	0.23%	3	0.05%	152	2.65%	5,731
Charlestown	276	84.40%	47	14.37%	3	0.92%	1	0.31%	0	0.00%	0	0.00%	229	70.03%	327
Coventry	1,151	70.40%	449	27.46%	18	1.10%	11	0.67%	6	0.37%	0	0.00%	702	42.94%	1,635
Cranston	6,468	77.99%	1,591	19.18%	187	2.25%	21	0.25%	19	0.23%	7	0.08%	4,877	58.81%	8,293
Cumberland	1,852	53.65%	1,520	44.03%	68	1.97%	5	0.14%	6	0.17%	1	0.03%	332	9.62%	3,452
East Greenwich	959	76.35%	283	22.53%	9	0.72%	4	0.32%	1	0.08%	0	0.00%	676	53.82%	1,256
East Providence	4,284	70.67%	1,603	26.44%	143	2.36%	11	0.18%	14	0.23%	7	0.12%	2,681	44.23%	6,062
Exeter	220	76.12%	68	23.53%	1	0.35%	0	0.00%	0	0.00%	0	0.00%	152	52.60%	289
Foster	308	72.81%	111	26.24%	0	0.00%	4	0.95%	0	0.00%	0	0.00%	197	46.57%	423
Glocester	435	74.23%	139	23.72%	10	1.71%	1	0.17%	1	0.17%	0	0.00%	296	50.51%	586
Hopkinton	718	78.38%	190	20.74%	2	0.22%	5	0.55%	1	0.11%	0	0.00%	528	57.64%	916
Jamestown	497	85.69%	50	8.62%	30	5.17%	0	0.00%	3	0.52%	0	0.00%	447	77.07%	580
Johnston	1,094	71.64%	339	22.20%	76	4.98%	13	0.85%	5	0.33%	0	0.00%	755	49.44%	1,527
Lincoln	1,700	60.80%	1,041	37.23%	43	1.54%	11	0.39%	0	0.00%	1	0.04%	659	23.57%	2,796
Little Compton	356	93.68%	19	5.00%	3	0.79%	2	0.53%	0	0.00%	0	0.00%	337	88.68%	380
Middletown	389	90.68%	37	8.62%	3	0.70%	0	0.00%	0	0.00%	0	0.00%	352	82.05%	429
Narragansett	410	76.49%	122	22.76%	1	0.19%	2	0.37%	0	0.00%	1	0.19%	288	53.73%	536
New Shoreham	343	88.40%	38	9.79%	0	0.00%	5	1.29%	1	0.26%	1	0.26%	305	78.61%	388
Newport	6,479	72.77%	1,910	21.45%	478	5.37%	14	0.16%	16	0.18%	6	0.07%	4,569	51.32%	8,903
North Kingstown	1,003	69.36%	430	29.74%	2	0.14%	9	0.62%	2	0.14%	0	0.00%	573	39.63%	1,446
North Providence	1,389	64.66%	660	30.73%	87	4.05%	4	0.19%	6	0.28%	2	0.09%	729	33.94%	2,148
North Smithfield	520	68.15%	226	29.62%	9	1.18%	2	0.26%	6	0.79%	0	0.00%	294	38.53%	763
Pawtucket	13,161	61.03%	7,765	36.01%	522	2.42%	48	0.22%	61	0.28%	9	0.04%	5,396	25.02%	21,566
Portsmouth	483	85.19%	50	8.82%	8	1.41%	25	4.41%	1	0.18%	0	0.00%	433	76.37%	567
Providence	36,408	58.79%	22,946	37.05%	2,098	3.39%	176	0.28%	249	0.40%	55	0.09%	13,462	21.74%	61,932
Richmond	365	77.49%	99	21.02%	2	0.42%	4	0.85%	1	0.21%	0	0.00%	266	56.48%	471
Scituate	807	81.93%	161	16.35%	1	0.10%	11	1.12%	5	0.51%	0	0.00%	646	65.58%	985
Smithfield	573	64.45%	286	32.17%	20	2.25%	9	1.01%	1	0.11%	0	0.00%	287	32.28%	889
South Kingstown	1,353	69.60%	569	29.27%	13	0.67%	5	0.26%	4	0.21%	0	0.00%	784	40.33%	1,944
Tiverton	772	85.87%	124	13.79%	0	0.00%	1	0.11%	1	0.11%	1	0.11%	648	72.08%	899
Warren	1,217	69.66%	507	29.02%	9	0.52%	9	0.52%	5	0.29%	0	0.00%	710	40.64%	1,747
Warwick	3,792	80.22%	801	16.95%	103	2.18%	17	0.36%	13	0.28%	1	0.02%	2,991	63.27%	4,727
West Greenwich	140	89.74%	13	8.33%	0	0.00%	3	1.92%	0	0.00%	0	0.00%	127	81.41%	156
West Warwick	2,432	56.09%	1,848	42.62%	35	0.81%	11	0.25%	9	0.21%	1	0.02%	584	13.47%	4,336
Westerly	2,075	78.63%	487	18.45%	52	1.97%	17	0.64%	8	0.30%	0	0.00%	1,588	60.17%	2,639
Woonsocket	5,900	59.53%	3,853	38.88%	123	1.24%	13	0.13%	21	0.21%	1	0.01%	2,047	20.65%	9,911
Totals	107,463	63.97%	55,062	32.78%	4,351	2.59%	510	0.30%	495	0.29%	100	0.06%	52,401	31.19%	167,981

== See also ==
- United States presidential elections in Rhode Island
