= 1848 United States presidential election in Rhode Island =

- November 7, 1848
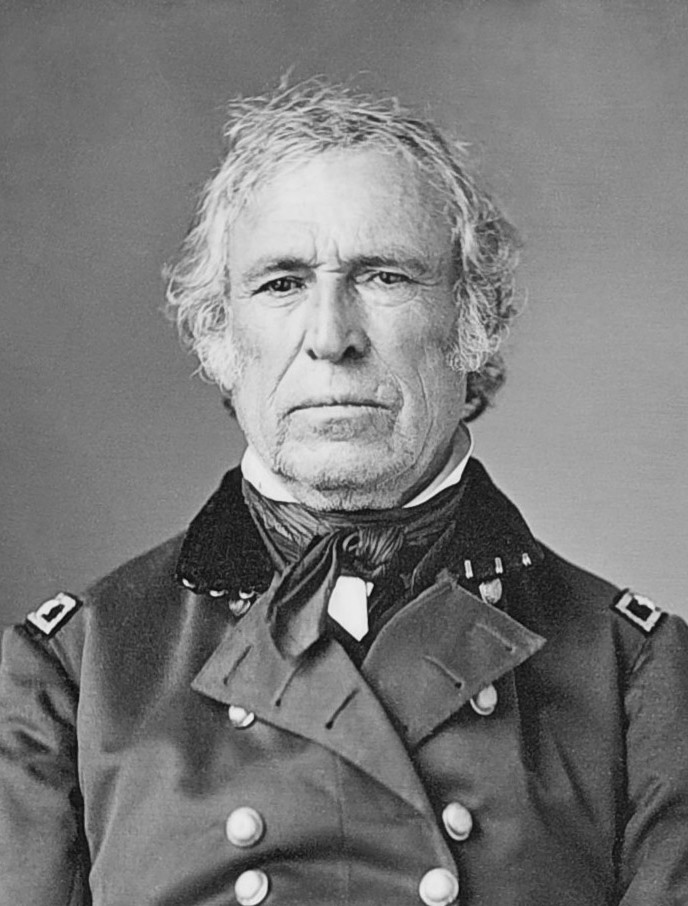

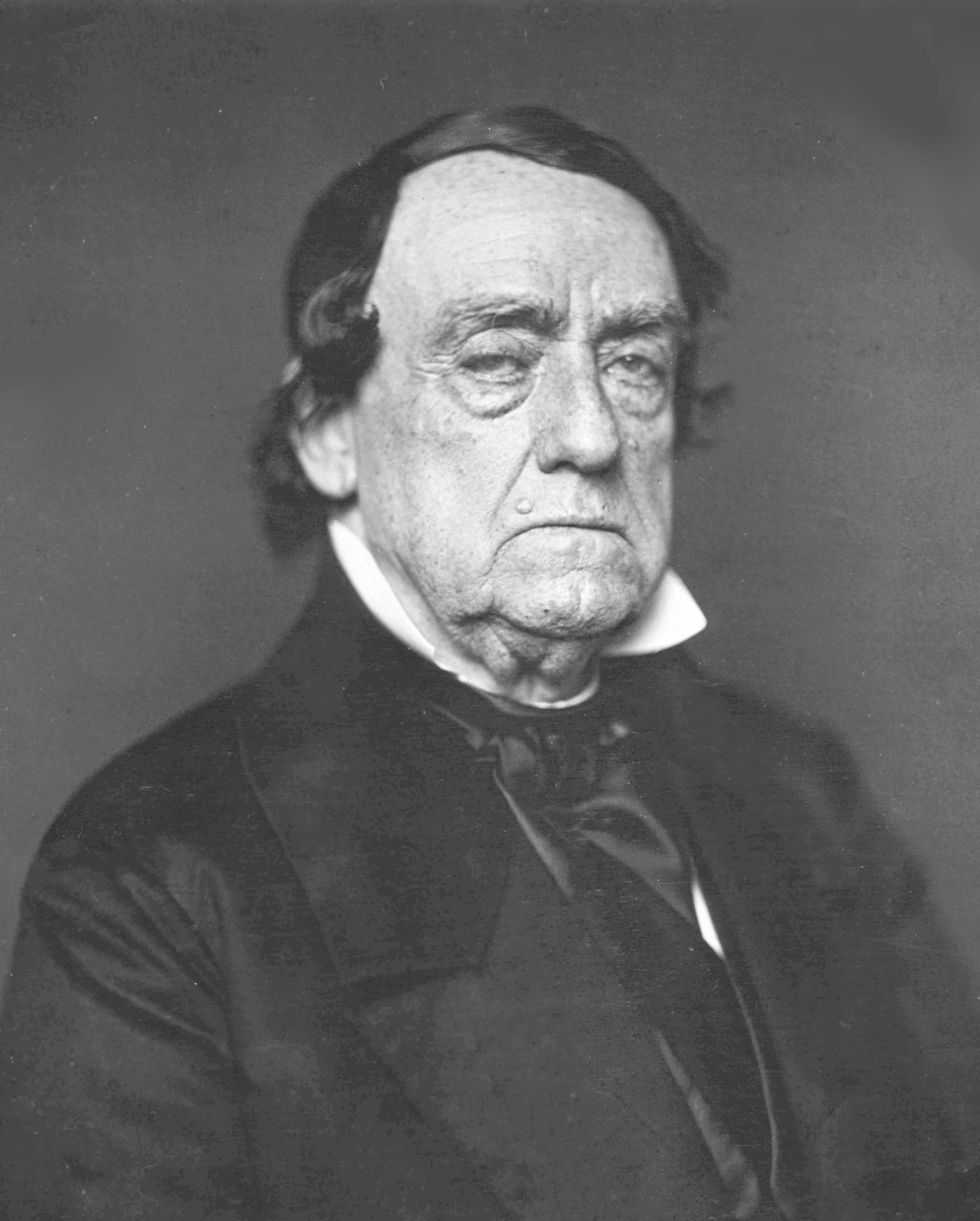

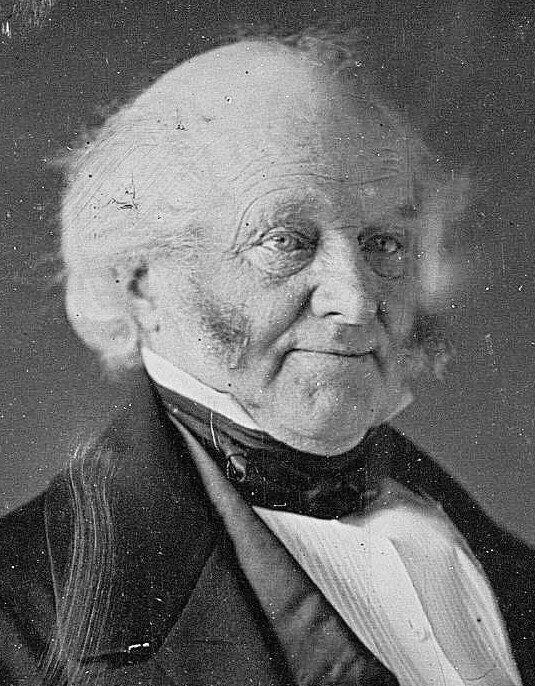
Nominee	Zachary Taylor	Lewis Cass	Martin Van Buren
Party	Whig	Democratic	Free Soil
Home state	Louisiana	Michigan	New York
Running mate	Millard Fillmore	William O. Butler	Charles Francis Adams Sr.
Electoral vote	4	0	0
Popular vote	6,779	3,646	730
Percentage	60.77%	32.68%	6.54%
County results
Taylor
50–60%
60–70%
President before election
James K. Polk
Democratic
Elected President
Zachary Taylor
Whig

The 1848 United States presidential election in Rhode Island took place on November 7, 1848, as part of the 1848 United States presidential election. Voters chose four representatives, or electors to the Electoral College, who voted for President and Vice President.

Rhode Island voted for the Whig candidate, Zachary Taylor, over Democratic candidate Lewis Cass and Free Soil candidate former president Martin Van Buren. Taylor won the state by a margin of 28.09%.

With 60.77% of the popular vote, Rhode Island would prove to be Taylor's strongest state in the election in terms of percentage in the popular vote.

== Results ==
1848 United States presidential election in Rhode Island
Party	Candidate	Running mate	Popular vote		Electoral vote	
Party	Candidate	Running mate	Count	%	Count	%
Whig	Zachary Taylor of Louisiana	Millard Fillmore of New York	6,779	60.77%	4	100.00%
Democratic	Lewis Cass of Michigan	William O. Butler of Kentucky	3,646	32.68%	0	0.00%
Free Soil	Martin Van Buren of New York	Charles Francis Adams Sr. of Massachusetts	730	6.54%	0	0.00%
Total			11,155	100.00%	4	100.00%

== See also ==
- United States presidential elections in Rhode Island
