= 1824 United States presidential election in Rhode Island =

US presidential election

- October 26 – December 2, 1824
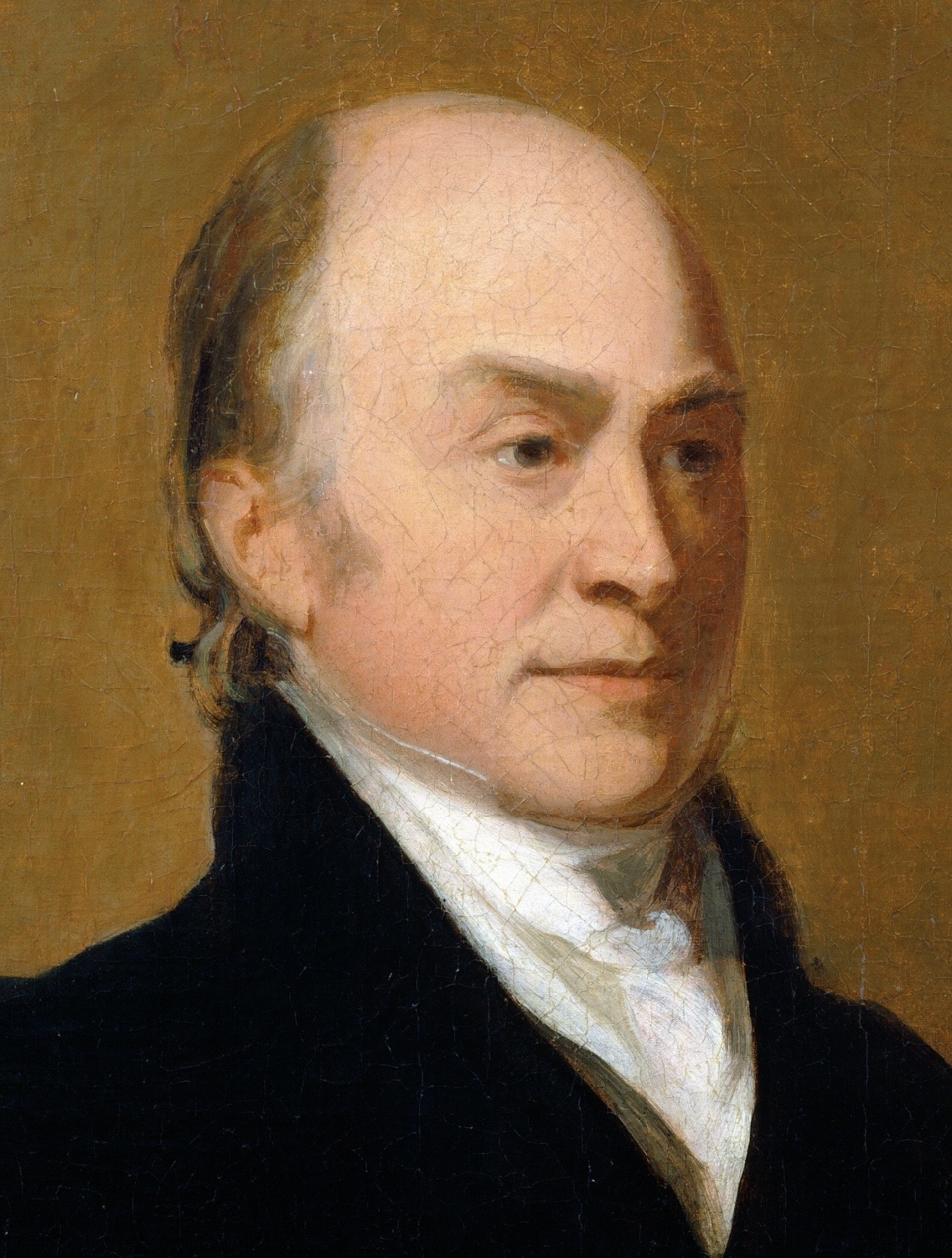

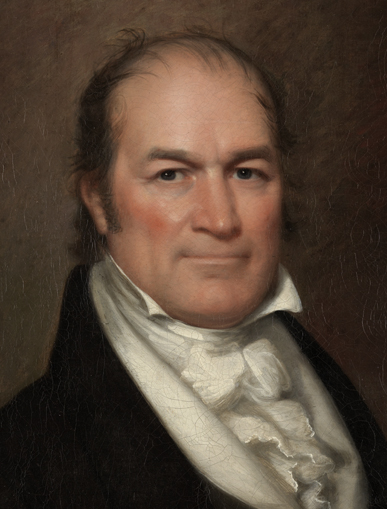
Nominee	John Quincy Adams	William H. Crawford
Party	Democratic-Republican	Democratic-Republican
Alliance	Adams-Clay Republican	Old Republican
Home state	Massachusetts	Georgia
Running mate	John C. Calhoun	Nathaniel Macon
Electoral vote	4	0
Popular vote	2,145	200
Percentage	91.47%	8.53%

Adams
50-60%
70–80%
80–90%
90–100%
Crawford
50-60%
60-70%
No data
President before election
James Monroe
Democratic-Republican
Elected President
John Quincy Adams
Democratic-Republican

The 1824 United States presidential election in Rhode Island took place between October 26 and December 2, 1824, as part of the 1824 United States presidential election. Voters chose four representatives, or electors to the Electoral College, who voted for President and Vice President.

During this election, the Democratic-Republican Party was the only major national party, and 4 different candidates from this party sought the Presidency. Rhode Island voted for John Quincy Adams over William H. Crawford, Henry Clay, and Andrew Jackson. Adams won Rhode Island by a margin of 82.94%.

== Results ==
1824 United States presidential election in Rhode Island
Party	Candidate	Votes	Percentage	Electoral votes
Democratic-Republican	John Quincy Adams	2,145	91.47%	4
Democratic-Republican	William H. Crawford	200	8.53%	0
Totals		2,345	100.0%	4

== See also ==
- United States presidential elections in Rhode Island
