= 1864 United States presidential election in Rhode Island =

- November 8, 1864

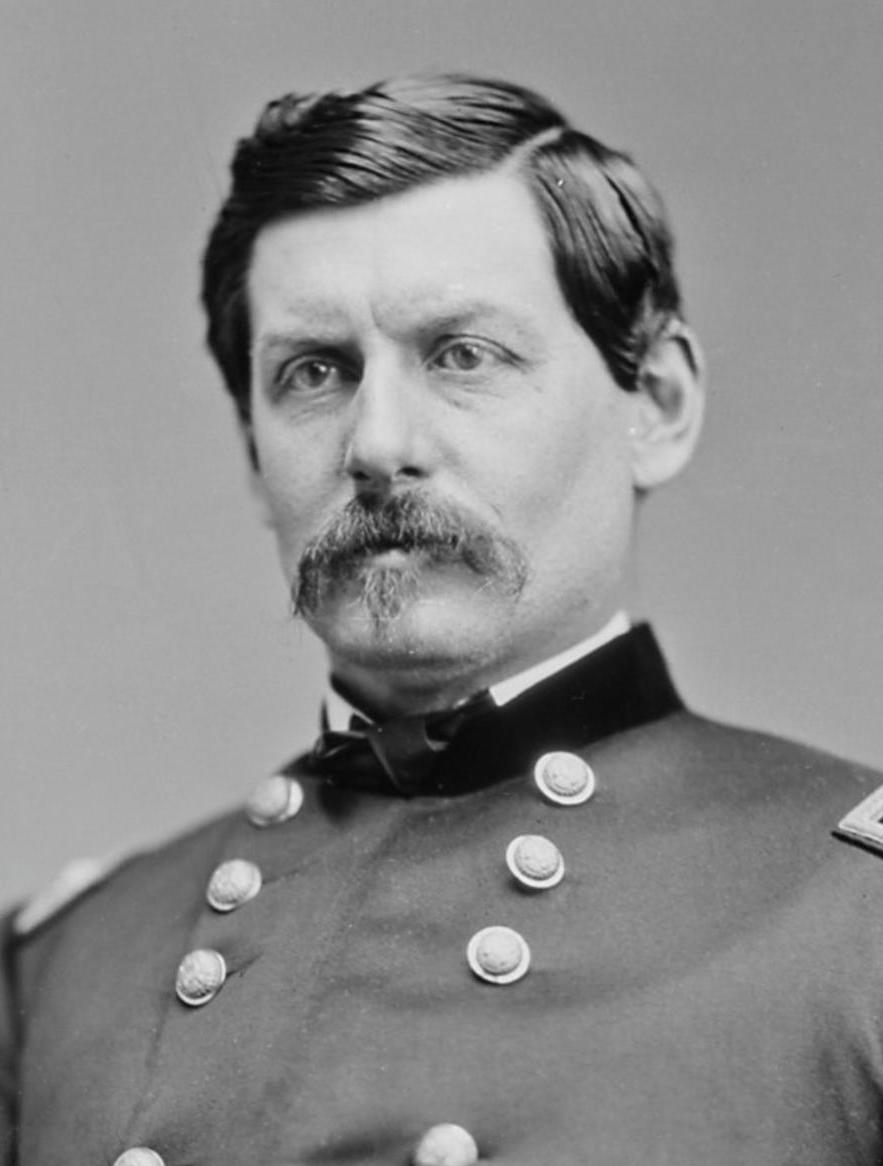
| Nominee | Abraham Lincoln | George B. McClellan |
| Party | National Union | Democratic |
| Home state | Illinois | New Jersey |
| Running mate | Andrew Johnson | George H. Pendleton |
| Electoral vote | 4 | 0 |
| Popular vote | 13,962 | 8,470 |
| Percentage | 62.24% | 37.76% |
County results
Lincoln
60–70%
President before election
Abraham Lincoln
Republican
Elected President
Abraham Lincoln
National Union

The 1864 United States presidential election in Rhode Island took place on November 8, 1864, as part of the 1864 United States presidential election. Voters chose four representatives, or electors to the Electoral College, who voted for president and vice president.

Rhode Island voted for the National Union candidate, incumbent Republican Party President Abraham Lincoln and his running mate Andrew Johnson. They defeated the Democratic candidate, George B. McClellan and his running mate George H. Pendleton. Lincoln won the state by a margin of 24.48%.

== Results ==
1864 United States presidential election in Rhode Island
| Party | Candidate | Votes | Percentage | Electoral votes |
|---|---|---|---|---|
| National Union | Abraham Lincoln (incumbent) | 13,962 | 62.24% | 4 |
| Democratic | George B. McClellan | 8,470 | 37.76% | 0 |
| Totals | | 22,432 | 100.0% | 4 |

== See also ==
- United States presidential elections in Rhode Island
