= 1856 United States presidential election in Rhode Island =

- November 4, 1856
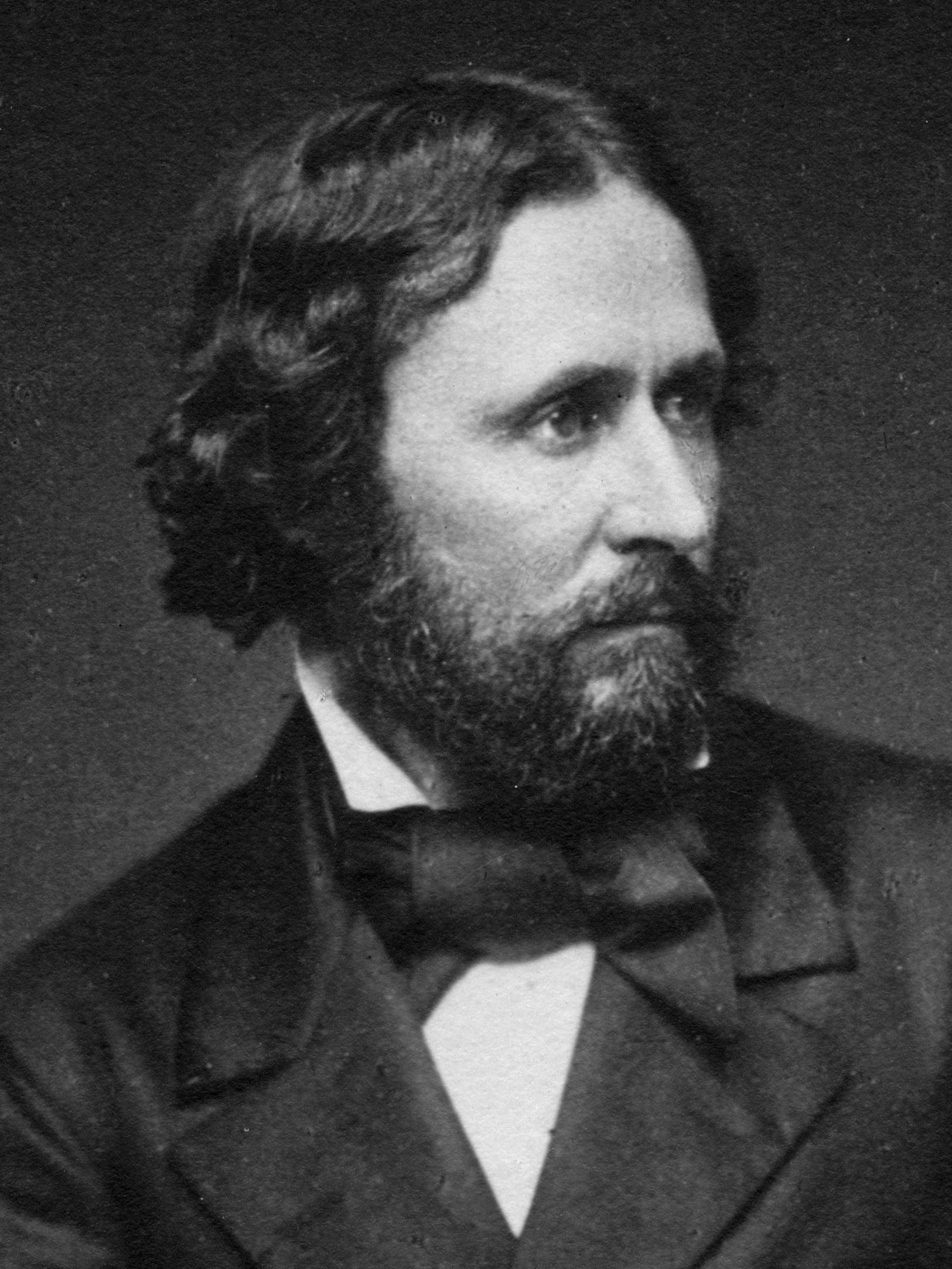

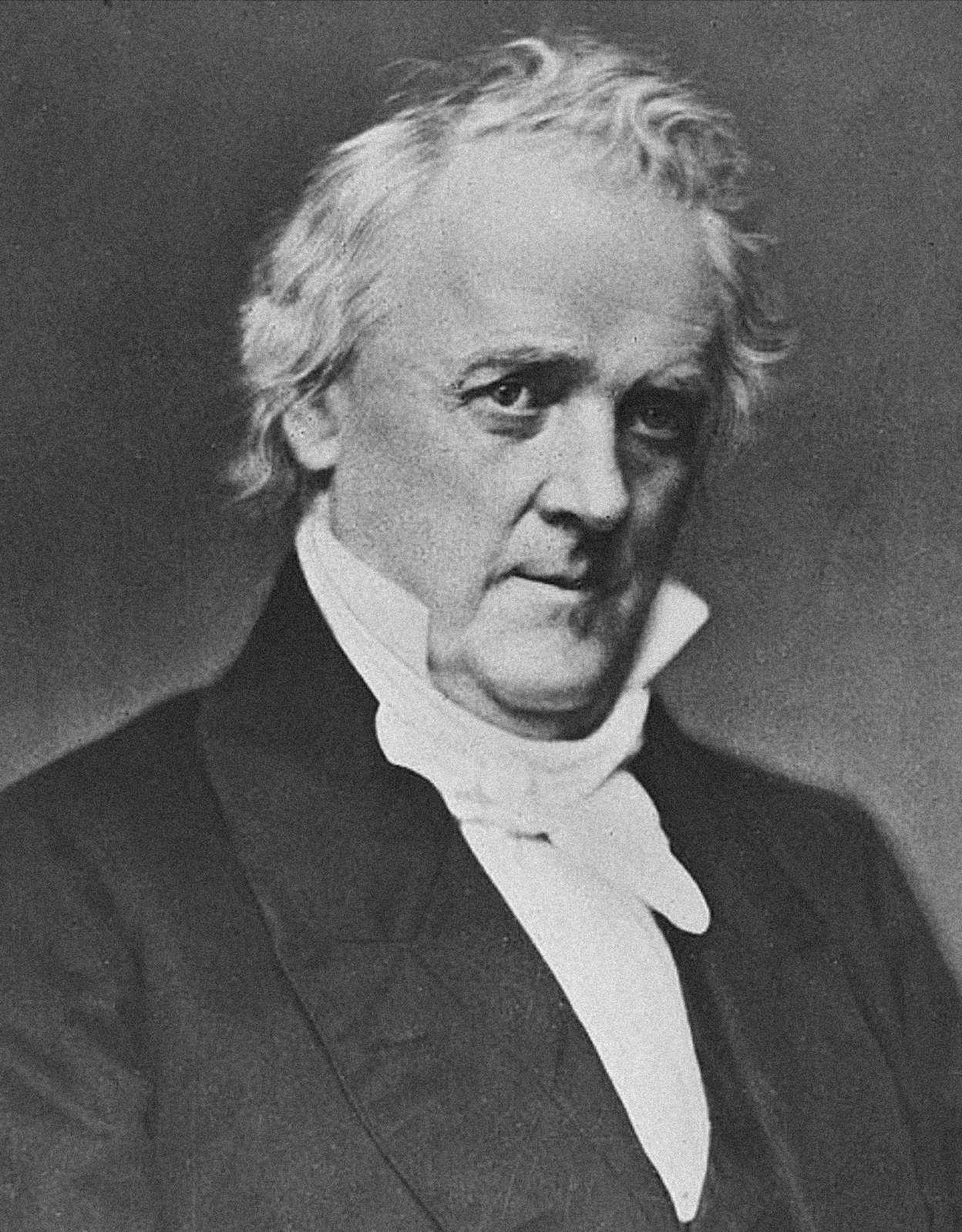

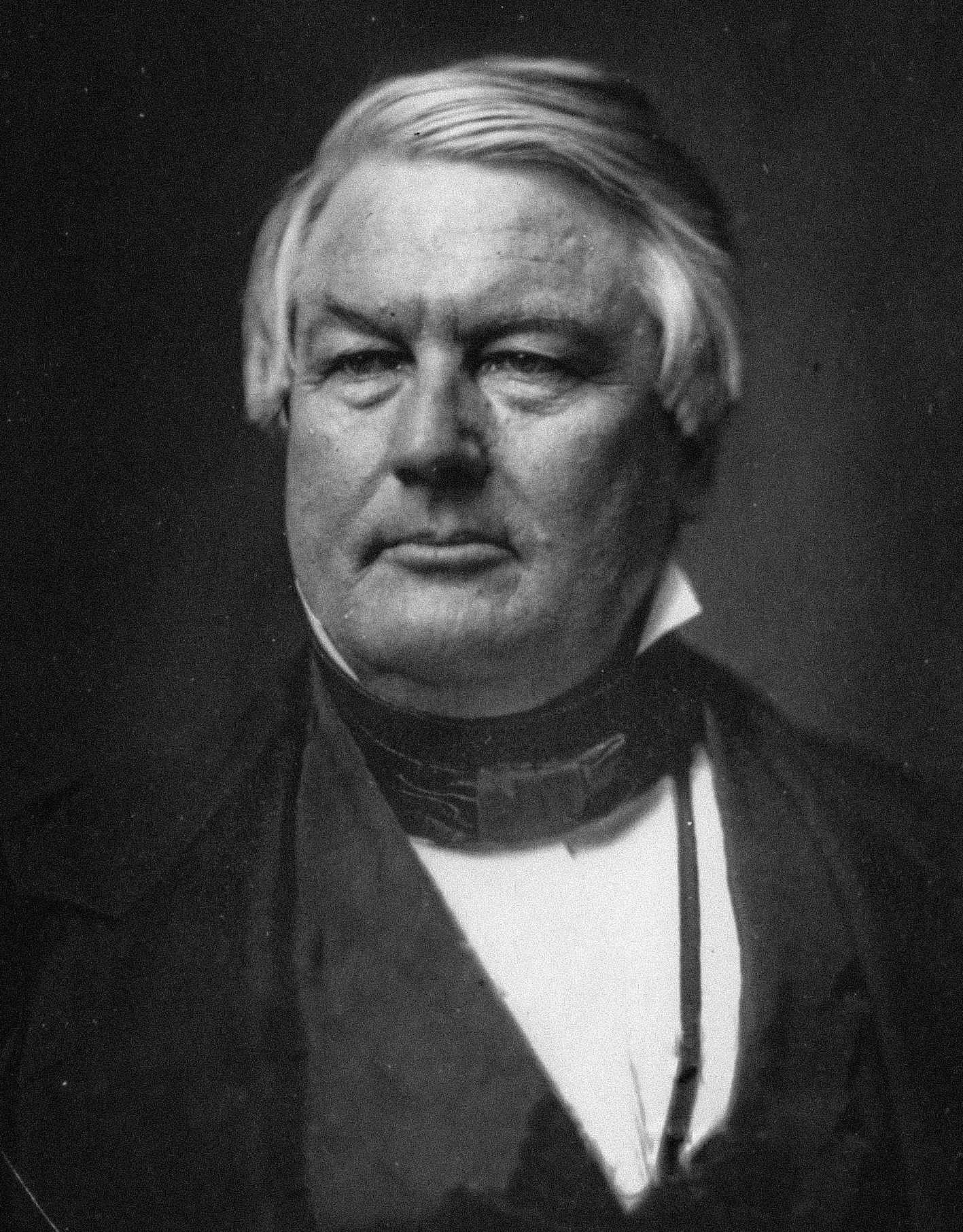
Nominee	John C. Frémont	James Buchanan	Millard Fillmore
Party	Republican	Democratic	Know Nothing
Home state	California	Pennsylvania	New York
Running mate	William L. Dayton	John C. Breckinridge	Andrew Jackson Donelson
Electoral vote	4	0	0
Popular vote	11,467	6,680	1,675
Percentage	57.85%	33.70%	8.45%
County results
Frémont
50–60%
60–70%
President before election
Franklin Pierce
Democratic
Elected President
James Buchanan
Democratic

The 1856 United States presidential election in Rhode Island took place on November 4, 1856, as part of the 1856 United States presidential election. Voters chose four representatives, or electors to the Electoral College, who voted for president and vice president.

Rhode Island voted for the Republican candidate, John C. Frémont, over the Democratic candidate, James Buchanan, and the Know Nothing candidate, Millard Fillmore. Frémont won the state by a margin of 24.15%.

With 57.85% of the popular vote, Rhode Island proved to be Frémont's fourth strongest state in the 1856 election after Vermont, Massachusetts and Maine.

== Results ==
1856 United States presidential election in Rhode Island
Party	Candidate	Running mate	Popular vote		Electoral vote	
Party	Candidate	Running mate	Count	%	Count	%
Republican	John C. Frémont of California	William L. Dayton of New Jersey	11,467	57.85%	4	100.00%
Democratic	James Buchanan of Pennsylvania	John C. Breckinridge of Kentucky	6,680	33.70%	0	0.00%
Know Nothing	Millard Fillmore of New York	Andrew Jackson Donelson of Tennessee	1,675	8.45%	0	0.00%
Total			19,822	100.00%	4	100.00%

== See also ==
- United States presidential elections in Rhode Island
