= 1840 United States presidential election in Rhode Island =

- November 2, 1840
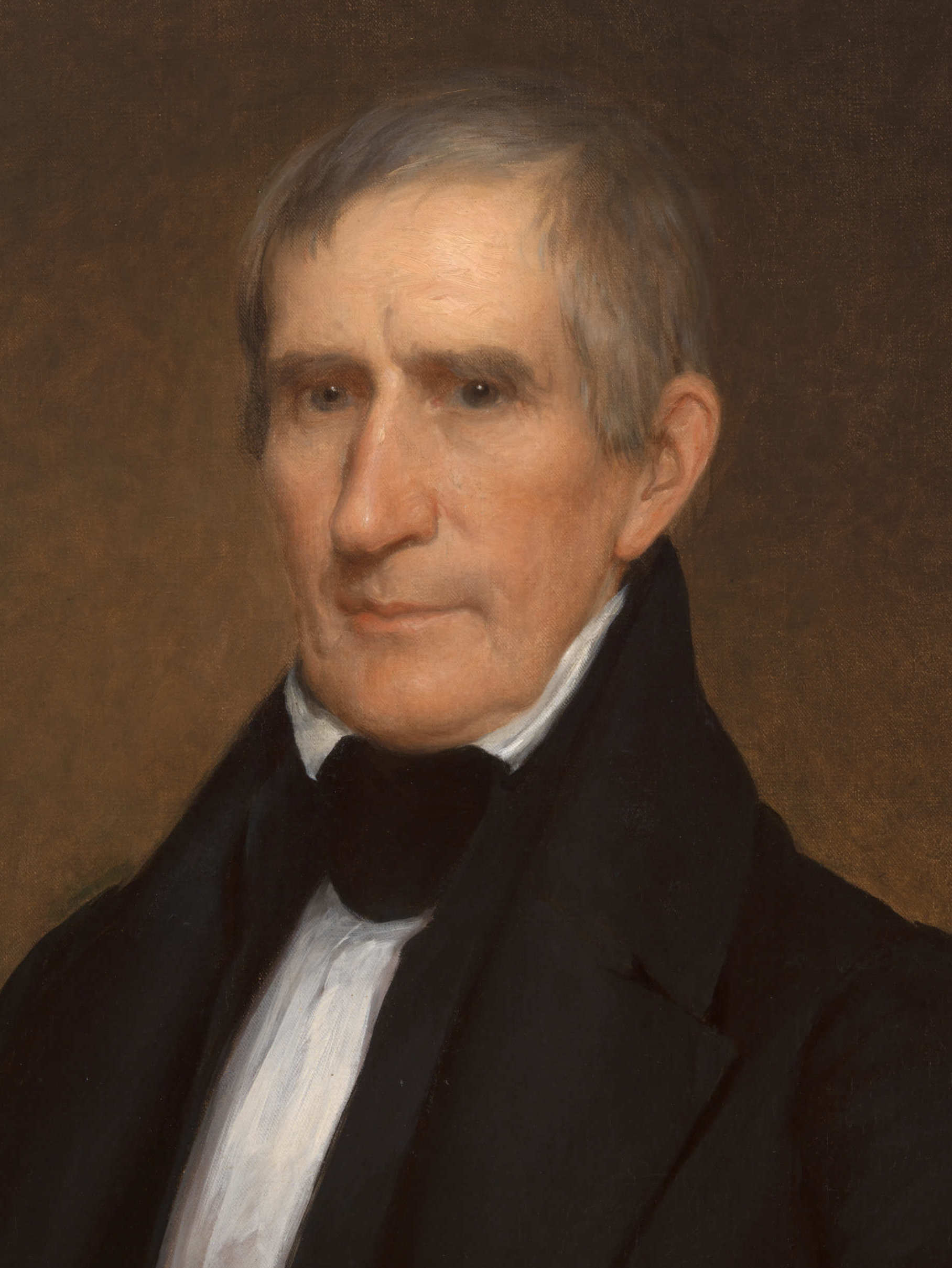

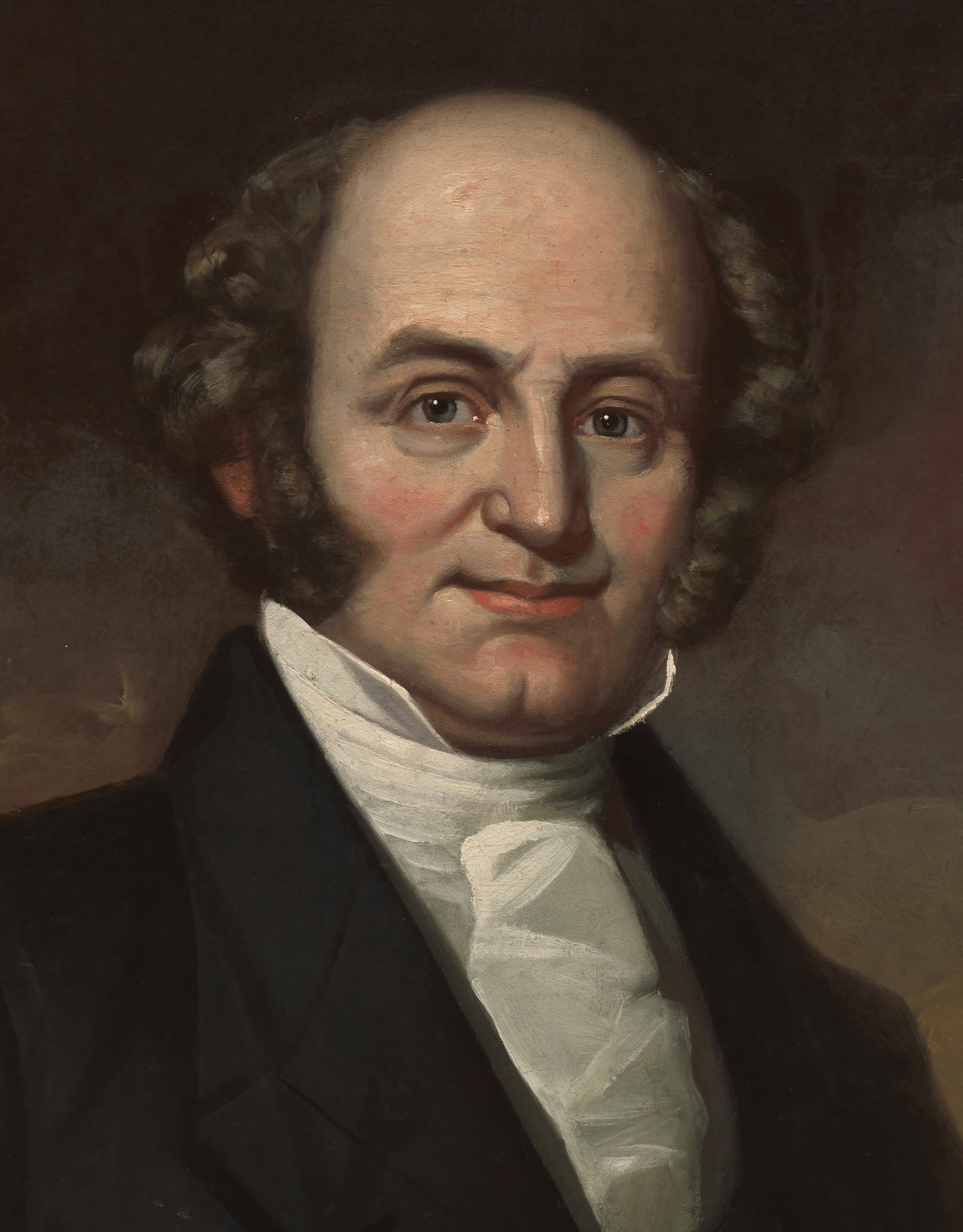
| Nominee | William Henry Harrison | Martin Van Buren |
| Party | Whig | Democratic |
| Home state | Ohio | New York |
| Running mate | John Tyler | none |
| Electoral vote | 4 | 0 |
| Popular vote | 5,278 | 3,301 |
| Percentage | 61.22% | 38.29% |
County results
Harrison
50–60%
60–70%
70–80%
President before election
Martin Van Buren
Democratic
Elected President
William Henry Harrison
Whig

A presidential election was held in Rhode Island on November 2, 1840 as part of the 1840 United States presidential election. Voters chose four representatives, or electors to the Electoral College, who voted for President and Vice President.

Rhode Island voted for the Whig candidate, William Henry Harrison, over Democratic candidate Martin Van Buren. Harrison won Rhode Island by a margin of 22.93%.

With 61.22% of the popular vote, Rhode Island would be Harrison's third strongest state in the 1840 election after Kentucky and Vermont.

== Results ==
1840 United States presidential election in Rhode Island
| Party | Candidate | Running mate | Popular vote | | Electoral vote | |
| Party | Candidate | Running mate | Count | % | Count | % |
|---|---|---|---|---|---|---|
| Whig | William Henry Harrison of Ohio | John Tyler of Virginia | 5,278 | 61.22% | 4 | 100.00% |
| Democratic | Martin Van Buren of New York | Richard Mentor Johnson of Kentucky | 3,301 | 38.29% | 0 | 0.00% |
| Liberty | James G. Birney of New York | Thomas Earle of Pennsylvania | 42 | 0.49% | 0 | 0.00% |
| Total | | | 8,621 | 100.00% | 4 | 100.00% |

== See also ==
- United States presidential elections in Rhode Island
