= 1916 United States presidential election in Rhode Island =

- November 7, 1916
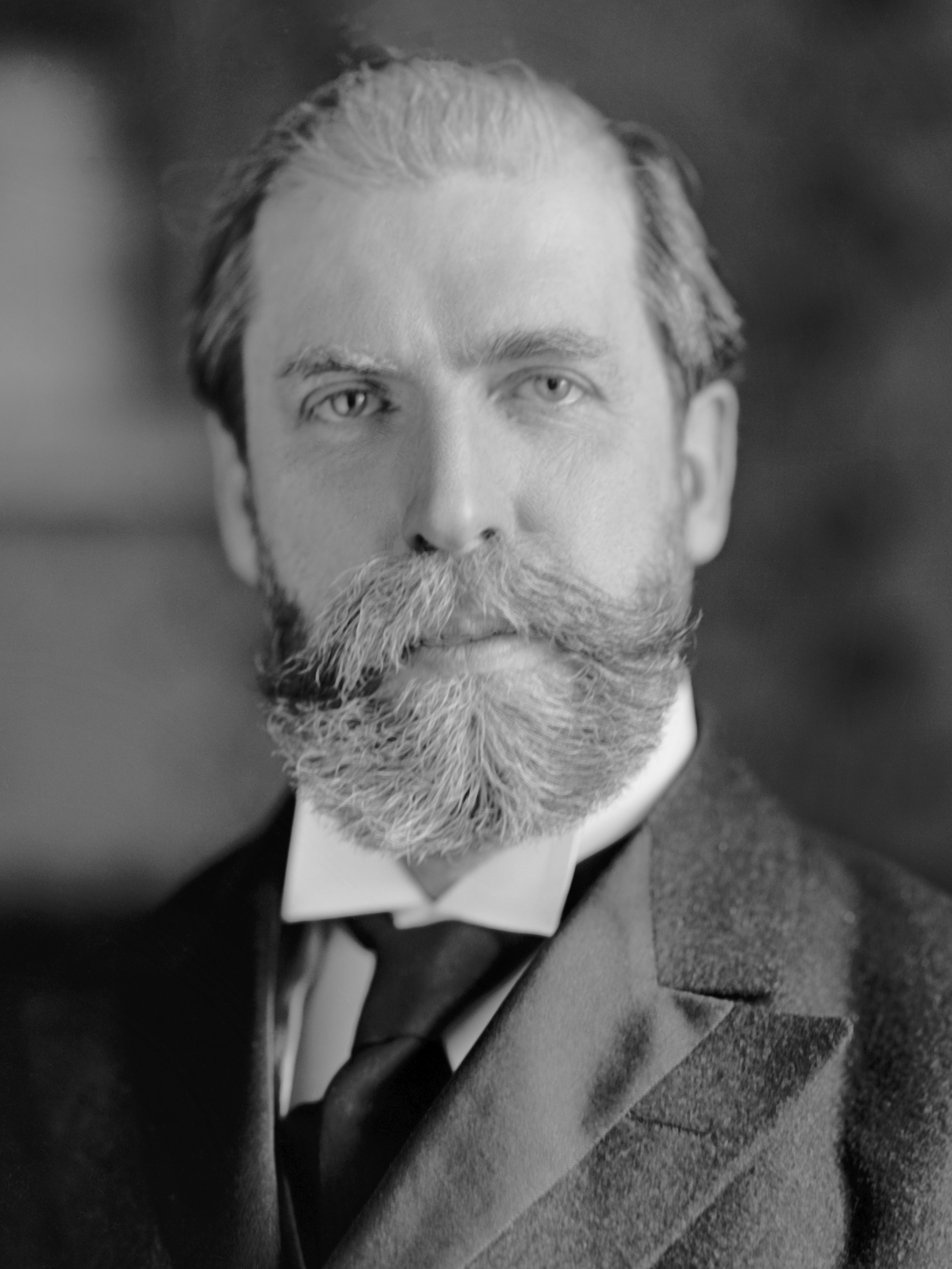

Nominee	Charles Evans Hughes	Woodrow Wilson
Party	Republican	Democratic
Home state	New York	New Jersey
Running mate	Charles W. Fairbanks	Thomas R. Marshall
Electoral vote	5	0
Popular vote	44,858	40,394
Percentage	51.08%	46.00%

Hughes
40–50%
50–60%
60–70%
70–80%
80–90%
Wilson
40–50%
50–60%
President before election
Woodrow Wilson
Democratic
Elected President
Woodrow Wilson
Democratic

The 1916 United States presidential election in Rhode Island took place on November 7, 1916, as part of the 1916 United States presidential election which was held throughout all contemporary 48 states. Voters chose five representatives, or electors, to the Electoral College, who voted for president and vice president.

Rhode Island was won by the Republican nominee, U.S. Supreme Court Justice Charles Evans Hughes of New York, and his running mate Senator Charles W. Fairbanks of Indiana. They defeated Democratic nominees incumbent Democratic President Woodrow Wilson and Vice President Thomas R. Marshall. Hughes won the state by a narrow margin of 5.08 points.

This was the first election since 1892 where a Democratic candidate earned more than forty percent in at least one Rhode Island county. As of the 2024 United States presidential election, it is also the most recent election where the Democratic candidate lost Rhode Island but won the presidency.

== Results ==
1916 United States presidential election in Rhode Island
Party	Candidate	Running mate	Popular vote		Electoral vote	
Party	Candidate	Running mate	Count	%	Count	%
Republican	Charles Evans Hughes of New York	Charles Warren Fairbanks of Indiana	44,858	51.08%	5	100.00%
Democratic	Woodrow Wilson of New Jersey	Thomas Riley Marshall of Indiana	40,394	46.00%	0	0.00%
Socialist	Allan Louis Benson of New York	George Ross Kirkpatrick of New Jersey	1,914	2.18%	0	0.00%
Prohibition	James Franklin Hanly of Indiana	Ira Landrith of Tennessee	470	0.54%	0	0.00%
Socialist Labor	Arthur Elmer Reimer of Massachusetts	Caleb Harrison of Illinois	180	0.20%	0	0.00%
Total			87,816	100.00%	5	100.00%

=== Results by town ===
Town	Charles E. Hughes Republican		Woodrow Wilson Democratic		Allan L. Benson Socialist		Frank Hanly Prohibition		Arthur E. Reimer Socialist Labor		Margin		Total votes cast
Town	#	%	#	%	#	%	#	%	#	%	#	%	Total votes cast
Barrington	322	67.65%	145	30.46%	4	0.84%	4	0.84%	1	0.21%	177	37.18%	476
Bristol	695	50.11%	647	46.65%	35	2.52%	8	0.58%	2	0.14%	48	3.46%	1,387
Burrillville	700	43.34%	877	54.30%	31	1.92%	4	0.25%	3	0.19%	-177	-10.96%	1,615
Central Falls	1,154	39.89%	1,678	58.00%	54	1.87%	5	0.17%	2	0.07%	-524	-18.11%	2,893
Charlestown	115	61.83%	65	34.95%	2	1.08%	4	2.15%	0	0.00%	50	26.88%	186
Coventry	606	61.09%	363	36.59%	8	0.81%	14	1.41%	1	0.10%	243	24.50%	992
Cranston	2,720	61.69%	1,522	34.52%	140	3.18%	21	0.48%	6	0.14%	1,198	27.17%	4,409
Cumberland	835	45.70%	937	51.29%	49	2.68%	2	0.11%	4	0.22%	-102	-5.58%	1,827
East Greenwich	396	67.23%	187	31.75%	2	0.34%	3	0.51%	1	0.17%	209	35.48%	589
East Providence	1,597	52.04%	1,356	44.18%	88	2.87%	26	0.85%	2	0.07%	241	7.85%	3,069
Exeter	81	44.75%	100	55.25%	0	0.00%	0	0.00%	0	0.00%	-19	-10.50%	181
Foster	181	64.87%	94	33.69%	2	0.72%	2	0.72%	0	0.00%	87	31.18%	279
Glocester	190	54.91%	154	44.51%	1	0.29%	1	0.29%	0	0.00%	36	10.40%	346
Hopkinton	243	51.48%	213	45.13%	1	0.21%	14	2.97%	1	0.21%	30	6.36%	472
Jamestown	209	70.85%	79	26.78%	6	2.03%	1	0.34%	0	0.00%	130	44.07%	295
Johnston	533	60.43%	310	35.15%	34	3.85%	5	0.57%	0	0.00%	223	25.28%	882
Lincoln	725	46.80%	781	50.42%	39	2.52%	3	0.19%	1	0.06%	-56	-3.62%	1,549
Little Compton	198	85.71%	30	12.99%	1	0.43%	2	0.87%	0	0.00%	168	72.73%	231
Middletown	213	75.27%	64	22.61%	3	1.06%	3	1.06%	0	0.00%	149	52.65%	283
Narragansett	176	55.00%	143	44.69%	0	0.00%	1	0.31%	0	0.00%	33	10.31%	320
New Shoreham	251	65.54%	130	33.94%	1	0.26%	1	0.26%	0	0.00%	121	31.59%	383
Newport	2,472	51.65%	2,241	46.82%	39	0.81%	23	0.48%	11	0.23%	231	4.83%	4,786
North Kingstown	532	56.72%	399	42.54%	3	0.32%	4	0.43%	0	0.00%	133	14.18%	938
North Providence	591	58.51%	398	39.41%	19	1.88%	1	0.10%	1	0.10%	193	19.11%	1,010
North Smithfield	205	43.43%	258	54.66%	6	1.27%	2	0.42%	1	0.21%	-53	-11.23%	472
Pawtucket	5,125	51.17%	4,570	45.63%	239	2.39%	50	0.50%	31	0.31%	555	5.54%	10,015
Portsmouth	238	62.14%	132	34.46%	0	0.00%	13	3.39%	0	0.00%	106	27.68%	383
Providence	14,991	47.57%	15,358	48.74%	921	2.92%	160	0.51%	81	0.26%	-367	-1.16%	31,511
Richmond	176	56.05%	127	40.45%	3	0.96%	8	2.55%	0	0.00%	49	15.61%	314
Scituate	364	49.86%	348	47.67%	3	0.41%	12	1.64%	3	0.41%	16	2.19%	730
Smithfield	272	53.54%	230	45.28%	5	0.98%	1	0.20%	0	0.00%	42	8.27%	508
South Kingstown	602	50.29%	577	48.20%	7	0.58%	11	0.92%	0	0.00%	25	2.09%	1,197
Tiverton	422	61.88%	256	37.54%	4	0.59%	0	0.00%	0	0.00%	166	24.34%	682
Warren	557	51.72%	500	46.43%	7	0.65%	6	0.56%	7	0.65%	57	5.29%	1,077
Warwick	1,740	66.16%	817	31.06%	46	1.75%	15	0.57%	12	0.46%	923	35.10%	2,630
West Greenwich	90	80.36%	18	16.07%	1	0.89%	3	2.68%	0	0.00%	72	64.29%	112
West Warwick	1,206	48.71%	1,247	50.36%	13	0.53%	8	0.32%	2	0.08%	-41	-1.66%	2,476
Westerly	912	59.45%	600	39.11%	6	0.39%	16	1.04%	0	0.00%	312	20.34%	1,534
Woonsocket	2,223	46.54%	2,443	51.14%	91	1.90%	13	0.27%	7	0.15%	-220	-4.61%	4,777
Totals	44,858	51.08%	40,394	46.00%	1,914	2.18%	470	0.54%	180	0.20%	4,464	5.08%	87,816

== See also ==
- United States presidential elections in Rhode Island
