= 1832 United States presidential election in Rhode Island =

- November 2 – December 5, 1832
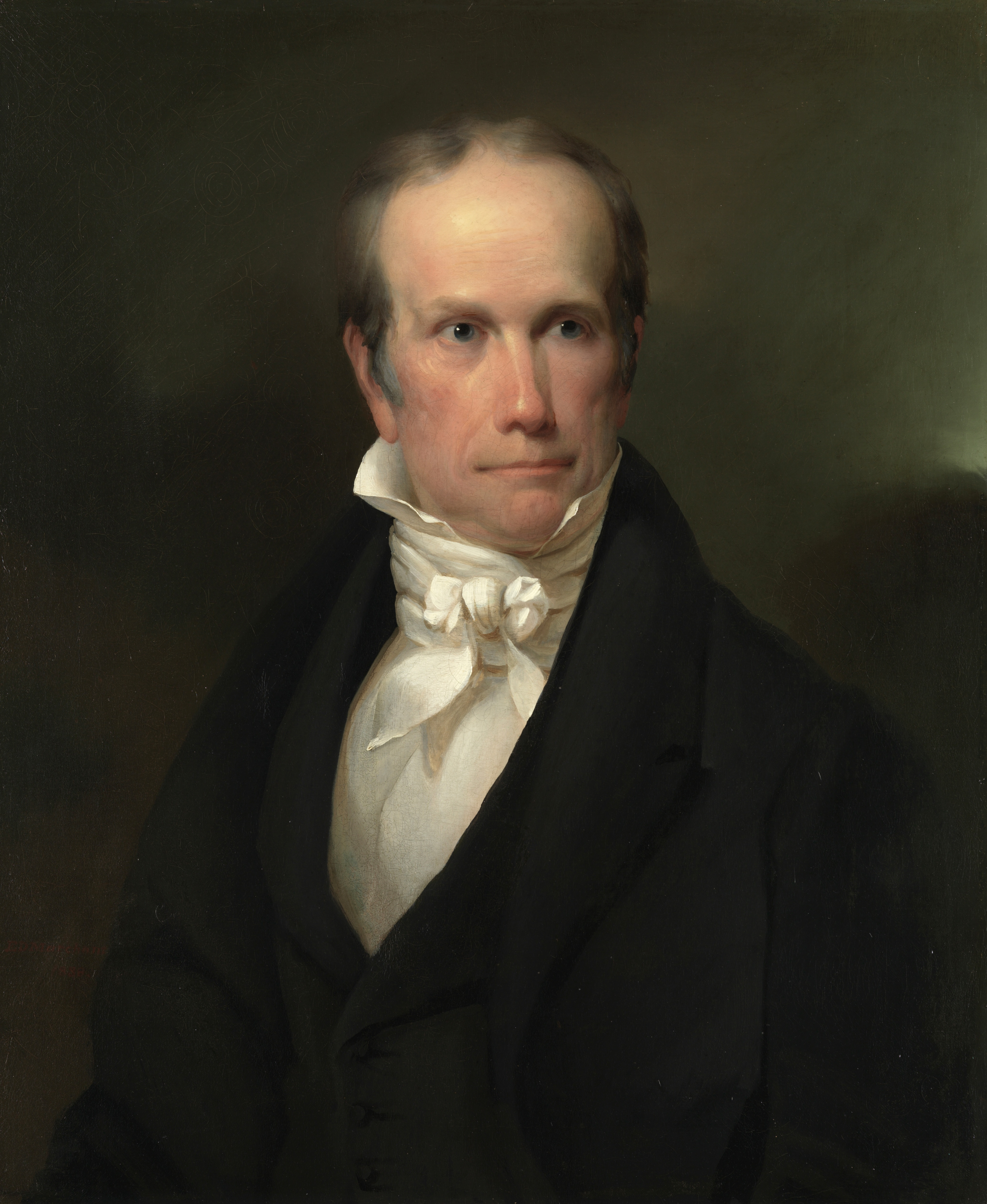

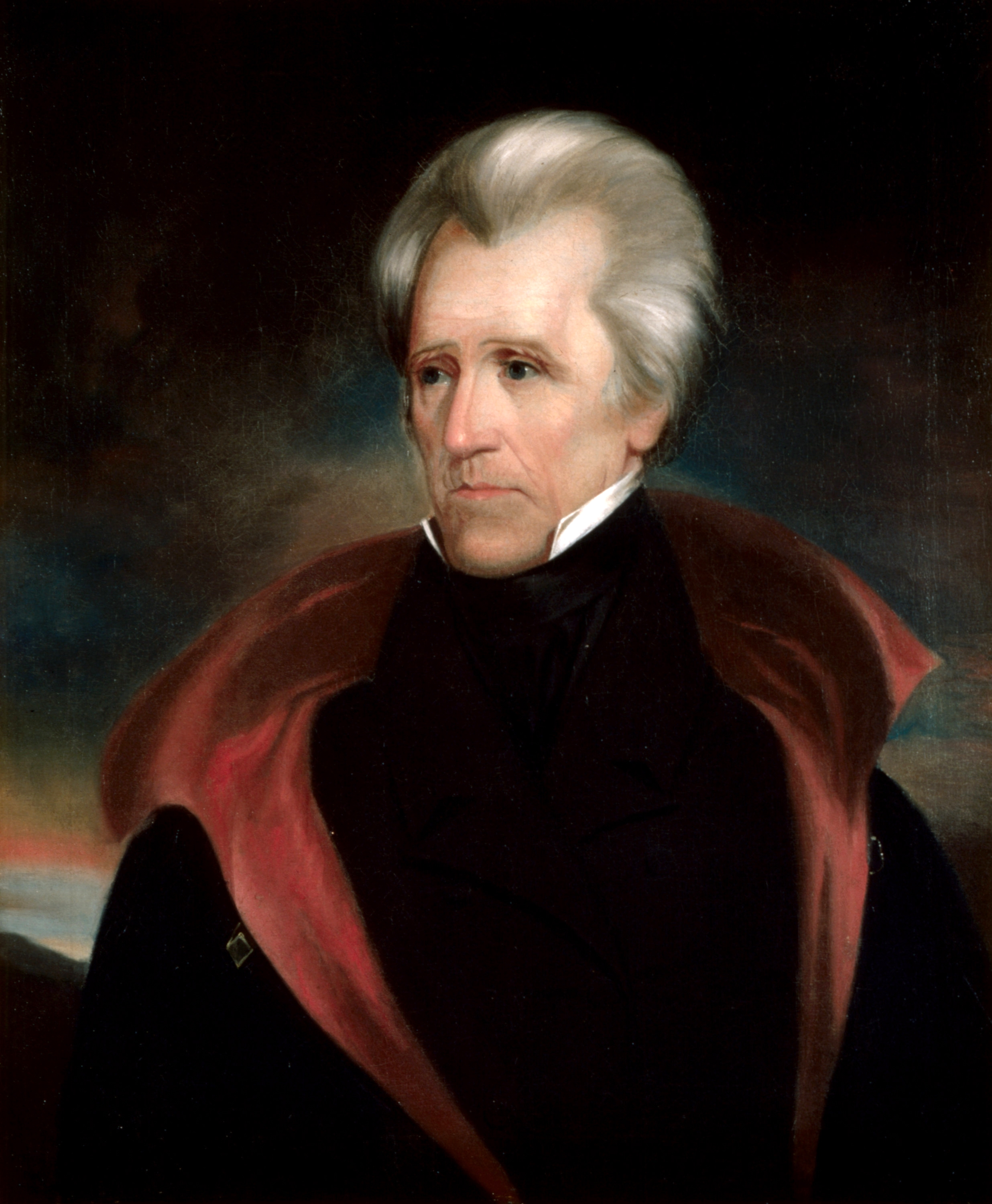
Nominee	Henry Clay	Andrew Jackson
Party	National Republican	Democratic
Home state	Kentucky	Tennessee
Running mate	John Sergeant	Martin Van Buren
Electoral vote	4	0
Popular vote	2,810	2,126
Percentage	56.93%	43.07%
County results
Clay
40–50%
50–60%
Jackson
50–60%

The 1832 United States presidential election in Rhode Island took place between November 2 and December 5, 1832, as part of the 1832 United States presidential election. Voters chose four representatives, or electors to the Electoral College, who voted for President and Vice President.

Rhode Island voted for the National Republican candidate, Henry Clay, over the Democratic Party candidate, Andrew Jackson. Clay won Rhode Island by a margin of 13.86%.

Jackson remains the only Democrat to win two consecutive terms without carrying Rhode Island either time.

== Results ==
1832 United States presidential election in Rhode Island
Party	Candidate	Votes	Percentage	Electoral votes
National Republican	Henry Clay	2,810	56.93%	4
Democratic	Andrew Jackson (incumbent)	2,126	43.07%	0
Totals		4,936	100.0%	4

== See also ==
- United States presidential elections in Rhode Island
