= 1964 United States presidential election in Rhode Island =

- November 3, 1964

Nominee	Lyndon B. Johnson	Barry Goldwater
Party	Democratic	Republican
Home state	Texas	Arizona
Running mate	Hubert Humphrey	William E. Miller
Electoral vote	4	0
Popular vote	315,463	74,615
Percentage	80.87%	19.13%

Johnson
50–60%
60–70%
70–80%
80–90%
90–100%
President before election
Lyndon B. Johnson
Democratic
President-elect
Lyndon B. Johnson
Democratic

The 1964 United States presidential election in Rhode Island took place on November 3, 1964, as part of the 1964 United States presidential election, which was held throughout all 50 states and D.C. Voters chose four representatives, or electors to the Electoral College, who voted for president and vice president.

Rhode Island voted overwhelmingly for the Democratic nominee, incumbent President Lyndon B. Johnson of Texas, over the Republican nominee, Senator Barry Goldwater of Arizona. Johnson ran with Senator Hubert H. Humphrey of Minnesota, while Goldwater's running mate was Congressman William E. Miller of New York.

Johnson carried Rhode Island in a landslide, taking 80.87% of the vote to Goldwater's 19.13%, a Democratic victory margin of 61.74%. This made Rhode Island Lyndon Johnson's strongest state in the nation: even in the midst of a massive nationwide Democratic landslide, Rhode Island weighed in as 39% more Democratic than the national average during the 1964 election.

The staunch conservative Goldwater was widely seen in the Northeastern United States as a right-wing extremist; he had voted against the Civil Rights Act of 1964, and the Johnson campaign portrayed him as a warmonger who as president would provoke a nuclear war. While John F. Kennedy had won 63.63% in Rhode Island in 1960 mostly by sweeping the ethnic Catholic vote, for 1964, this traditional Democratic coalition was joined by mass defections of moderate Yankee Republicans who had voted for Eisenhower and Nixon but could not support Goldwater.

His landslide was so large that he won a record 315,463 votes, a record that still has not been beaten. The closest any candidate has come since then was in 2020, when Joe Biden took 307,486 votes. No other state's highest raw vote total predates 2008, when John McCain set the record in Alaska and Barack Obama did so in Michigan. Consequently, the incumbent Johnson was able to take more than 80% of the vote in liberal Rhode Island. Johnson's winning margin of over 240,000 votes is the largest in history for a presidential candidate in Rhode Island, with no one else even coming within 100,000 of that winning margin.

== Results ==
Electoral results
Presidential candidate	Party	Home state	Popular vote		Electoral vote	Running mate		
Presidential candidate	Party	Home state	Count	Percentage	Electoral vote	Vice-presidential candidate	Home state	Electoral vote
Lyndon B. Johnson	Democratic	Texas	315,463	80.87%	4	Hubert Humphrey	Minnesota	4
Barry Goldwater	Republican	Arizona	74,615	19.13%	0	William E. Miller	New York	0
Total			390,078	100%	4			4
Needed to win					270			270

=== By county ===
County	Lyndon B. Johnson Democratic		Barry Goldwater Republican		Various candidates Other parties		Margin		Total votes cast
County	#	%	#	%	#	%	#	%	Total votes cast
Bristol	14,306	76.21%	4,466	23.79%	0	0.00%	9,840	52.42%	18,772
Kent	44,476	78.34%	12,297	21.66%	0	0.00%	32,179	56.68%	56,773
Newport	19,782	73.65%	7,078	26.35%	0	0.00%	12,704	47.30%	26,860
Providence	219,465	83.48%	43,432	16.52%	0	0.00%	176,033	66.96%	262,897
Washington	17,434	70.37%	7,342	29.63%	0	0.00%	10,092	40.74%	24,776
Totals	315,463	80.87%	74,615	19.13%	13	0.00%	240,848	61.74%	390,091

==== Counties that flipped from Republican to Democratic ====
- Washington

== Analysis ==
Johnson swept all five counties in Rhode Island with over 70% of the vote. In Providence County, the most populated county, home to the state's capital and largest city, Providence, Johnson took 83.5% of the vote. Washington County voted Democratic for the first time since 1852. This was the strongest showing ever for a Democratic presidential candidate in Providence County. Johnson's 80.87% remains the highest vote share percentage any presidential candidate of either party has ever received in Rhode Island, and his 61.74% victory margin remains the widest margin by which any candidate of either party has ever won the state. Additionally, Johnson's victory, alongside Goldwater's victory in Mississppi marked the last time a Presidential nominee won over 80% of the vote in a state.

== See also ==
- United States presidential elections in Rhode Island
