= 1888 United States presidential election in Rhode Island =

- November 6, 1888
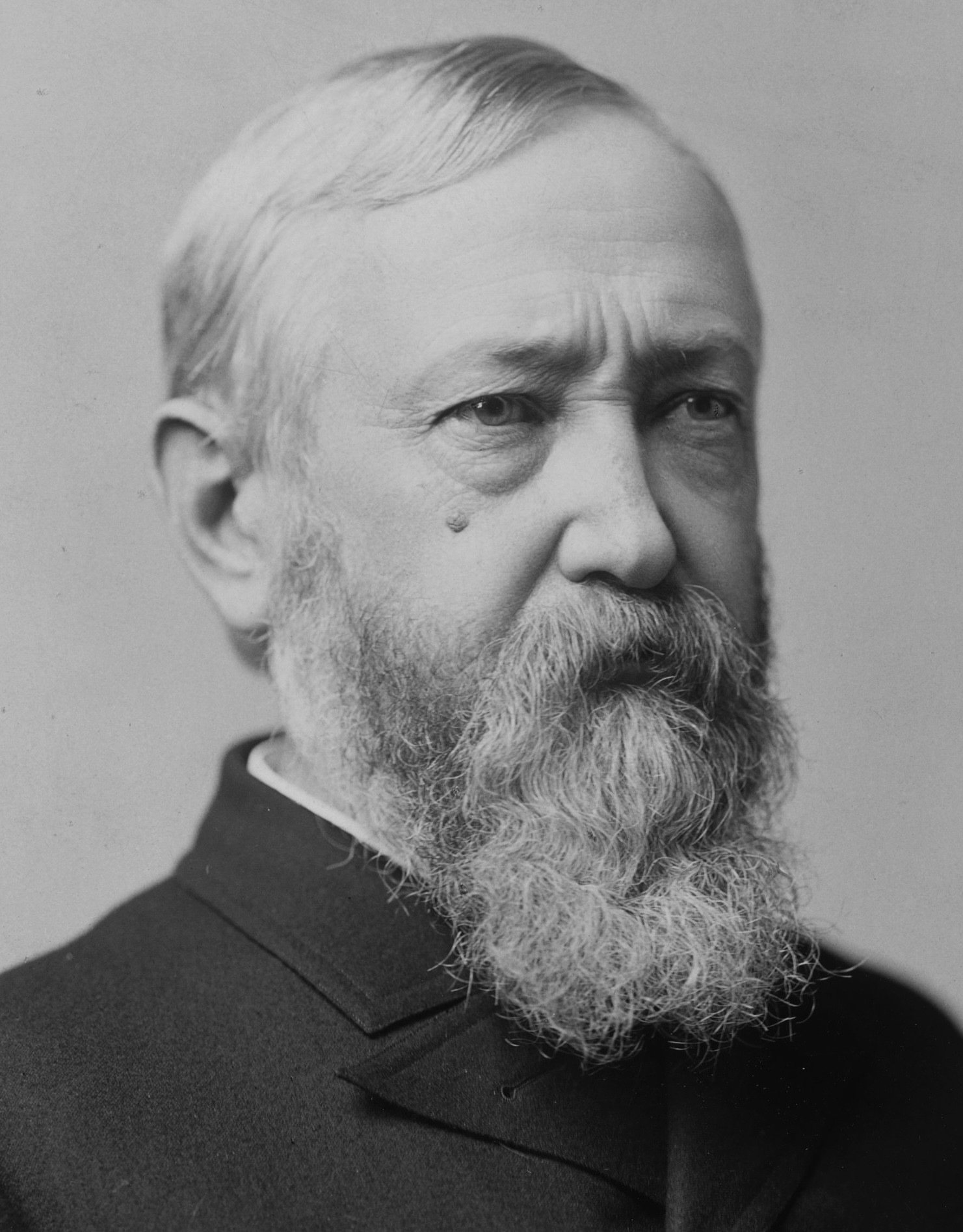

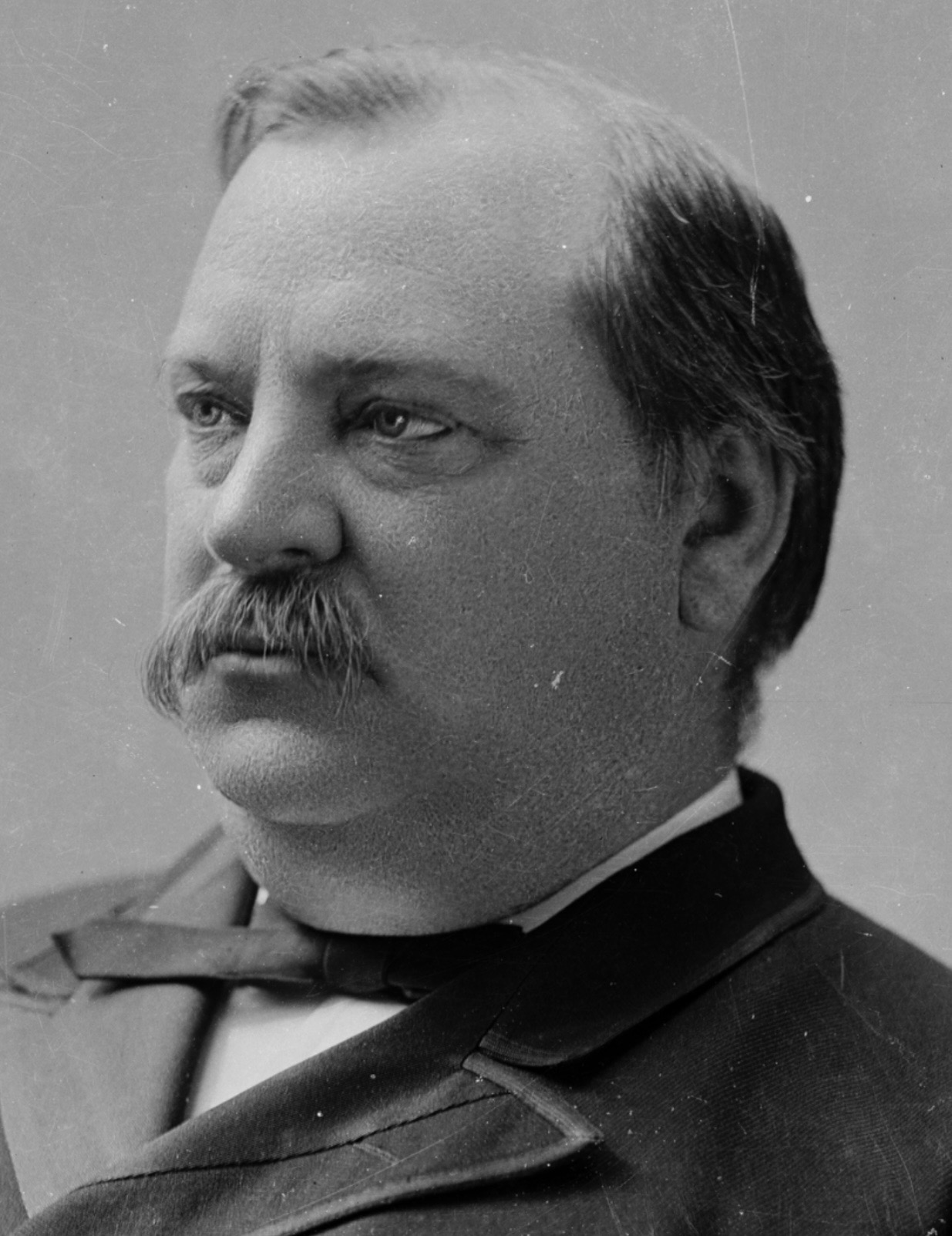
| Nominee | Benjamin Harrison | Grover Cleveland |
| Party | Republican | Democratic |
| Home state | Indiana | New York |
| Running mate | Levi P. Morton | Allen G. Thurman |
| Electoral vote | 4 | 0 |
| Popular vote | 21,969 | 17,530 |
| Percentage | 53.88% | 42.99% |

Harrison
40–50%
50–60%
60–70%
70–80%
80–90%
Cleveland
40–50%
50–60%
President before election
Grover Cleveland
Democratic
Elected President
Benjamin Harrison
Republican

The 1888 United States presidential election in Rhode Island took place on November 6, 1888, as part of the 1888 United States presidential election. Voters chose four representatives, or electors to the Electoral College, who voted for president and vice president.

Rhode Island voted for the Republican nominee, Benjamin Harrison, over the Democratic nominee, incumbent President Grover Cleveland. Harrison won the state by a margin of 10.89%.

== Results ==
1888 United States presidential election in Rhode Island
| Party | Candidate | Running mate | Popular vote | | Electoral vote | |
| Party | Candidate | Running mate | Count | % | Count | % |
|---|---|---|---|---|---|---|
| Republican | Benjamin Harrison of Indiana | Levi Parsons Morton of New York | 21,969 | 53.88% | 4 | 100.00% |
| Democratic | Grover Cleveland of New York (incumbent) | Allen Granberry Thurman of Ohio | 17,530 | 42.99% | 0 | 0.00% |
| Prohibition | Clinton Bowen Fisk of New Jersey | John Anderson Brooks of Missouri | 1,251 | 3.07% | 0 | 0.00% |
| Union Labor | Alson Jenness Streetcar of Illinois | Charles E. Cunningham of Arkansas | 18 | 0.04% | 0 | 0.00% |
| N/A | Others | Others | 7 | 0.02% | 0 | 0.00% |
| Total | | | 40,775 | 100.00% | 4 | 100.00% |

== See also ==
- United States presidential elections in Rhode Island
