= Bristol County, Rhode Island =

County in Rhode Island, United States

Bristol County
- County
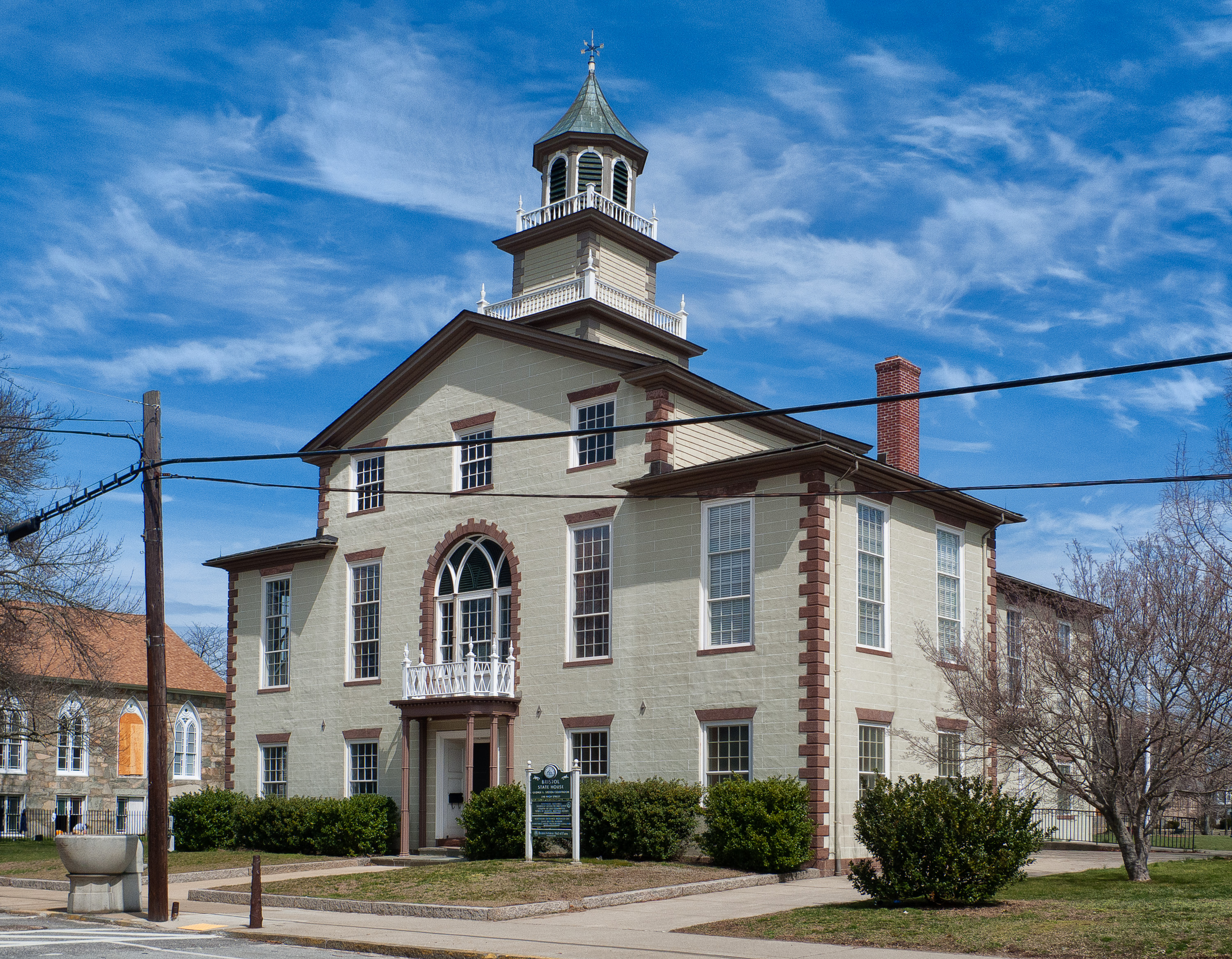
- Bristol County Courthouse in Bristol
- Interactive map of Bristol County
- Coordinates: 41.70°N 71.28°W
- Country: United States
- State: Rhode Island
- Region: New England
- Metro area: Providence
- Formed: February 17, 1747; 279 years ago
- Named after: Bristol, England
- County town: Bristol
- Largest town: Bristol
- Incorporated municipalities: 3 towns

Area
  - Total: 45 sq mi (120 km^{2})
  - Land: 24 sq mi (62 km^{2})
  - Water: 21 sq mi (54 km^{2}) 46%
- Highest elevation: 221 ft (67 m)
- Lowest elevation: 0 ft (0 m)

Population (April 1, 2020)
  - Total: 50,793
  - Estimate (2025): 50,001 ▼
  - Density: 1,128.7/sq mi (435.8/km^{2})

GDP
  - Total: $2.286 billion (2022)
- Time zone: UTC−05:00 (EST)
  - Summer (DST): UTC−04:00 (EDT)
- ZIP Code format: 028xx
- Area code: 401
- FIPS code: 44-001
- GNIS feature ID: 1219777
- Congressional district: 1st

Bristol County is a county located in the U.S. state of Rhode Island. As of the 2020 census, the population was 50,793, making it the least populous county in Rhode Island. In terms of land area, it is the third-smallest county in the United States, at only 25 square miles (65 km^{2}). The county was created in 1747 when it was separated from Bristol County, Massachusetts. Bristol County is included in the Providence metropolitan area, which in turn constitutes a portion of the Greater Boston area.

== History ==
The county was formed by the transfer of part of Bristol County, Massachusetts, to the Colony of Rhode Island in 1746, having been the subject of a long-running border dispute.

The original county was part of the Plymouth Colony and named after its "shire town" (county seat), what is now Bristol, Rhode Island. The new Rhode Island county was formed in 1746 with the full modern territory of Bristol, Barrington, and Warren.

See Bristol County, Massachusetts, for later land transfers between Massachusetts and Rhode Island.

== Geography ==
According to the United States Census Bureau, the county has a total area of 45 square miles (120 km^{2}), of which 24 square miles (62 km^{2}) is land and 21 square miles (54 km^{2}) (46%) is water. It is the smallest county in Rhode Island. In land area only (water area omitted), it is the third-smallest county in the United States, following Kalawao County, Hawaii and New York County, New York (Manhattan). The highest point in the county is Mount Hope, in Bristol, which stands 217 feet (66 m) above sea level.

== Government ==
While Rhode Island is subdivided geographically into five counties, county government was abolished in the state in 1842. Since that time, counties in Rhode Island have had no associated governmental structures. All local government in the state is vested in its 39 municipalities. Counties are still generally used as both geographic regions and also as judicial districts.

=== Adjacent counties ===
- Bristol County, Massachusetts: east
- Providence County: north
- Kent County: west
- Newport County: south

== Demographics ==
Historical population
Census	Pop.	Note	%±
1790	3,211		—
1800	3,801		18.4%
1810	5,072		33.4%
1820	5,637		11.1%
1830	5,446		−3.4%
1840	6,476		18.9%
1850	8,514		31.5%
1860	8,907		4.6%
1870	9,421		5.8%
1880	11,394		20.9%
1890	11,428		0.3%
1900	13,144		15.0%
1910	17,602		33.9%
1920	23,113		31.3%
1930	25,089		8.5%
1940	25,548		1.8%
1950	29,079		13.8%
1960	37,146		27.7%
1970	45,937		23.7%
1980	46,942		2.2%
1990	48,859		4.1%
2000	50,648		3.7%
2010	49,875		−1.5%
2020	50,793		1.8%
2025 (est.)	50,001	▼	−1.6%
U.S. Decennial Census; 1790–1960 1900–1990; 1990–2000 2010–2019

=== 2020 census ===
As of the 2020 census, the county had a population of 50,793. Of the residents, 18.1% were under the age of 18 and 21.1% were 65 years of age or older; the median age was 44.6 years. For every 100 females there were 92.7 males, and for every 100 females age 18 and over there were 90.2 males. 98.9% of residents lived in urban areas and 1.1% lived in rural areas.

The racial makeup of the county was 89.3% White, 1.5% Black or African American, 0.2% American Indian and Alaska Native, 2.5% Asian, 1.0% from some other race, and 5.5% from two or more races. Hispanic or Latino residents of any race comprised 3.8% of the population.

There were 19,926 households in the county, of which 27.4% had children under the age of 18 living with them and 27.2% had a female householder with no spouse or partner present. About 28.7% of all households were made up of individuals and 13.5% had someone living alone who was 65 years of age or older.

There were 21,504 housing units, of which 7.3% were vacant. Among occupied housing units, 69.4% were owner-occupied and 30.6% were renter-occupied. The homeowner vacancy rate was 0.8% and the rental vacancy rate was 4.8%.

Bristol County, Rhode Island – Racial and ethnic composition Note: the US Census treats Hispanic/Latino as an ethnic category. This table excludes Latinos from the racial categories and assigns them to a separate category. Hispanics/Latinos may be of any race.
Race / Ethnicity (NH = Non-Hispanic)	Pop 2000	Pop 2010	Pop 2020	% 2000	% 2010	% 2020
White alone (NH)	48,651	47,052	44,671	96.05%	94.33%	87.94%
Black or African American alone (NH)	331	363	732	0.65%	0.72%	1.44%
Native American or Alaska Native alone (NH)	72	71	85	0.14%	0.14%	0.16%
Asian alone (NH)	500	704	1,279	0.98%	1.41%	2.51%
Pacific Islander alone (NH)	14	3	1	0.02%	0.00%	0.00%
Other race alone (NH)	36	51	169	0.07%	0.10%	0.33%
Mixed race or Multiracial (NH)	472	642	1,913	0.93%	1.28%	3.76%
Hispanic or Latino (any race)	572	989	1,943	1.12%	1.98%	3.82%
Total	50,648	49,875	50,793	100.00%	100.00%	100.00%

=== 2010 census ===
As of the 2010 United States census, there were 49,875 people, 19,150 households, and 12,750 families living in the county. The population density was 2,064.0 inhabitants per square mile (796.9/km^{2}). There were 20,850 housing units at an average density of 862.8 per square mile (333.1/km^{2}). The racial makeup of the county was 95.7% white, 1.4% Asian, 0.8% black or African American, 0.2% American Indian, 0.4% from other races, and 1.5% from two or more races. Those of Hispanic or Latino origin made up 2.0% of the population. The largest ancestry groups were:

- (Portugal) 24.8% Portuguese
- (Republic of Ireland) 22.2% Irish
- (Italy) 21.0% Italian
- (England) 14.5% English
- (France) 9.8% French
- (Germany) 8.1% German
- (Canada) 4.4% French Canadian
- (Poland) 4.3% Polish
- (Scotland) 2.9% Scottish
- (United States) 2.7% American
- (Sweden) 2.4% Swedish
- (Northern Ireland) 2.0% Scotch-Irish
- (Greece) 1.5% Greek
- (Russia) 1.4% Russian

Of the 19,150 households, 29.8% had children under the age of 18 living with them, 53.4% were married couples living together, 9.8% had a female householder with no husband present, 33.4% were non-families, and 27.4% of all households were made up of individuals. The average household size was 2.44 and the average family size was 2.99. The median age was 42.9 years.

The median income for a household in the county was $68,333 and the median income for a family was $87,781. Males had a median income of $59,725 versus $44,060 for females. The per capita income for the county was $35,588. About 3.5% of families and 6.5% of the population were below the poverty line, including 4.2% of those under age 18 and 5.4% of those age 65 or over.

=== 2000 census ===
As of the 2000 United States census, there were 50,648 people, 19,033 households, and 13,361 families living in the county. The population density was 2,052 inhabitants per square mile (792/km^{2}). There were 19,881 housing units at an average density of 805 per square mile (311/km^{2}). The racial makeup of the county was 96.81% White, 0.69% Black or African American, 0.16% Native American, 1% Asian, 0.03% Pacific Islander, 0.3% from other races, and 1.01% from two or more races. Of the population 1.13% were Hispanic or Latino of any race. 24.7% were of Portuguese, 18.6% Italian, 12.4% Irish, 10.5% English and 5.9% French ancestry. 85.4% spoke English, 10.4% Portuguese and 1.3% Spanish as their first language. The United States Census Bureau reported Bristol County as being one of two counties in the United States with a plurality of people of Portuguese ancestry (the other being contiguous Bristol County, Massachusetts).

There were 19,033 households, out of which 31.80% had children under the age of 18 living with them, 57.30% were married couples living together, 9.90% had a female householder with no husband present, and 29.80% were non-families. Of all households 25.10% were made up of individuals, and 11.20% had someone living alone who was 65 years of age or older. The average household size was 2.52 and the average family size was 3.04.

In the county, the population was spread out, with 22.90% under the age of 18, 9.50% from 18 to 24, 27.40% from 25 to 44, 23.40% from 45 to 64, and 16.70% who were 65 years of age or older. The median age was 39 years. For every 100 females, there were 93.10 males. For every 100 females age 18 and over, there were 89.50 males.

The median income for a household in the county was $50,737, and the median income for a family was $63,114. Males had a median income of $41,902 versus $28,985 for females. The per capita income for the county was $26,503. About 4.40% of families and 6.30% of the population were below the poverty line, including 6.20% of those under age 18 and 9.60% of those age 65 or over.

== Politics ==
United States presidential election results for Bristol County, Rhode Island
Year	Republican		Democratic		Third party(ies)	
Year	No.	%	No.	%	No.	%
1840	3,792	46.39%	4,382	53.61%	0	0.00%
1844	4,237	45.52%	5,071	54.47%	1	0.01%
1864	780	63.47%	449	36.53%	0	0.00%
1880	1,039	69.54%	443	29.65%	12	0.80%
1884	987	57.25%	654	37.94%	83	4.81%
1888	981	55.58%	703	39.83%	81	4.59%
1892	1,107	53.09%	905	43.41%	73	3.50%
1896	1,321	72.11%	424	23.14%	87	4.75%
1900	1,273	61.20%	727	34.95%	80	3.85%
1904	1,457	59.08%	963	39.05%	46	1.87%
1908	1,606	61.79%	899	34.59%	94	3.62%
1912	1,126	41.78%	1,077	39.96%	492	18.26%
1916	1,574	53.54%	1,292	43.95%	74	2.52%
1920	3,692	68.80%	1,569	29.24%	105	1.96%
1924	4,076	60.57%	2,500	37.15%	153	2.27%
1928	3,780	48.01%	4,080	51.82%	13	0.17%
1932	3,833	44.04%	4,775	54.87%	95	1.09%
1936	4,867	45.65%	5,327	49.96%	468	4.39%
1940	5,314	47.09%	5,967	52.88%	3	0.03%
1944	4,919	43.83%	6,287	56.02%	16	0.14%
1948	5,343	41.16%	7,562	58.25%	77	0.59%
1952	8,468	50.44%	8,313	49.51%	8	0.05%
1956	10,070	59.88%	6,748	40.12%	0	0.00%
1960	7,537	40.44%	11,099	59.56%	0	0.00%
1964	4,466	23.79%	14,306	76.21%	0	0.00%
1968	7,403	38.01%	11,561	59.36%	511	2.62%
1972	12,009	54.62%	9,928	45.16%	48	0.22%
1976	10,131	47.29%	11,228	52.41%	66	0.31%
1980	8,508	38.93%	9,851	45.08%	3,493	15.98%
1984	11,635	55.18%	9,386	44.52%	63	0.30%
1988	10,626	48.56%	11,168	51.04%	89	0.41%
1992	8,208	32.95%	11,414	45.82%	5,289	21.23%
1996	6,988	32.25%	12,257	56.56%	2,426	11.19%
2000	8,375	35.99%	13,424	57.68%	1,473	6.33%
2004	9,855	39.85%	14,448	58.42%	429	1.73%
2008	9,260	35.75%	16,162	62.39%	483	1.86%
2012	9,231	37.41%	14,974	60.68%	471	1.91%
2016	8,965	35.19%	14,609	57.35%	1,901	7.46%
2020	9,745	34.30%	18,050	63.52%	620	2.18%
2024	10,048	35.46%	17,458	61.61%	829	2.93%

Since 1928, Bristol County has leaned Democratic, only voting for Republicans in national landslide elections after that. The county has voted Democratic in every presidential election since 1984, often by margins of over 20 points.

Gubernatorial elections results

Gubernatorial elections results
Year	Republican	Democratic	Third parties
2022	34.7% 7,134	61.8% 12,724	3.5% 717
2018	32.0% 6,772	58.1% 12,316	9.9% 2,091
2014	26.21% 4,806	39.88% 7,312	33.91% 6,218
2010	34.37% 6,796	19.98% 3,950	45.64% 9,025

United States Senate election results for Bristol County, Rhode Island1
Year	Republican		Democratic		Third party(ies)	
Year	No.	%	No.	%	No.	%
2024	9,888	35.97%	17,552	63.85%	49	0.18%
2018	7,757	36.51%	13,441	63.26%	48	0.23%
2012	8,390	36.51%	14,556	63.35%	32	0.14%

United States Senate election results for Bristol County, Rhode Island2
Year	Republican		Democratic		Third party(ies)	
Year	No.	%	No.	%	No.	%
2020	8,213	30.02%	19,106	69.83%	40	0.15%
2014	4,940	27.71%	12,856	72.12%	29	0.16%

== Communities ==
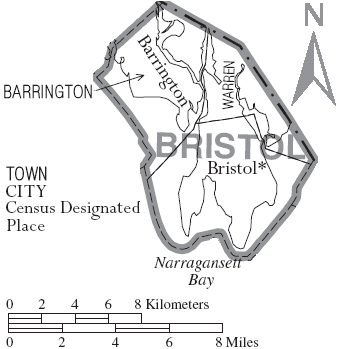
Map of Bristol County, Rhode Island showing cities, towns, and CDPs

The following towns are located in Bristol County:

- Barrington
- Bristol (traditional county seat)
- Warren

== Education ==
There are two school districts in the county: Barrington Public Schools and Bristol-Warren Regional School District.

== See also ==
- National Register of Historic Places listings in Bristol County, Rhode Island
