= 2020 United States presidential election in Rhode Island =

- November 3, 2020
- Turnout: 67.6% ▲

Nominee	Joe Biden	Donald Trump
Party	Democratic	Republican
Home state	Delaware	Florida
Running mate	Kamala Harris	Mike Pence
Electoral vote	4	0
Popular vote	307,486	199,922
Percentage	59.39%	38.61%

Biden
40–50%
50–60%
60–70%
70–80%
80–90%
90–100%
Trump
40–50%
50–60%
60–70%
No Votes
President before election
Donald Trump
Republican
Elected President
Joe Biden
Democratic

The 2020 United States presidential election in Rhode Island was held on Tuesday, November 3, 2020, as part of the 2020 United States presidential election in which all 50 states plus the District of Columbia participated. Rhode Island voters chose electors to represent them in the Electoral College via a popular vote, pitting the Republican Party's nominee, incumbent President Donald Trump, and running mate Vice President Mike Pence against Democratic Party nominee, former Vice President Joe Biden, and his running mate California Senator Kamala Harris. Rhode Island has four electoral votes in the Electoral College.

Prior to the election, Rhode Island was considered to be a state Biden would win or a safe blue state. Biden won the state by 20.8 percentage points, receiving 59.4% of the statewide vote to Trump's 38.6%. His margin of victory was an improvement from Hillary Clinton's 15.5-point victory in 2016, though still noticeably trailing Barack Obama's near 28-point margins in the state in 2008 and 2012. Rhode Island became one of three states where Biden won every county during the election, the other two being Massachusetts and Hawaii.

Rhode Island voted 16% more Democratic than the national average.

== Primary elections ==
The primary elections were originally scheduled for April 28, 2020. On March 23, they were moved to June 2 due to concerns over the COVID-19 pandemic.

=== Republican primary ===
Donald Trump won the Republican primary, and received all of the state's 19 delegates to the 2020 Republican National Convention.

=== Democratic primary ===
2020 Rhode Island Democratic presidential primary
Candidate	Votes	%	Delegates
Joe Biden	79,728	76.67	25
Bernie Sanders (withdrawn)	15,525	14.93	1
Elizabeth Warren (withdrawn)	4,479	4.31	
Andrew Yang (withdrawn)	802	0.77	
Tulsi Gabbard (withdrawn)	651	0.63	
Write-in votes	936	0.90	
Uncommitted	1,861	1.79	
Total	103,982	100%	26

== General election ==
=== Predictions ===
Source	Ranking	As of
The Cook Political Report	Safe D	September 10, 2020
Inside Elections	Safe D	September 4, 2020
Sabato's Crystal Ball	Safe D	July 14, 2020
Politico	Safe D	September 8, 2020
RCP	Safe D	August 3, 2020
Niskanen	Likely D	July 26, 2020
CNN	Safe D	August 3, 2020
The Economist	Safe D	September 2, 2020
CBS News	Likely D	August 16, 2020
270towin	Safe D	August 2, 2020
ABC News	Safe D	July 31, 2020
NPR	Likely D	August 3, 2020
NBC News	Likely D	August 6, 2020
538	Safe D	September 9, 2020

=== Polling ===
==== Graphical summary ====
View source data.

==== Aggregate polls ====
Source of poll aggregation	Dates administered	Dates updated	Joe Biden Democratic	Donald Trump Republican	Other/ Undecided (Note: Calculated by taking the difference of 100% and all other candidates combined.)	Margin
FiveThirtyEight	until November 2, 2020	November 3, 2020	62.9%	32.4%	4.7%	Biden +30.6

==== Polls ====
Poll source	Date(s) administered	Sample size (Note: Key: A – all adults RV – registered voters LV – likely voters V – unclear)	Margin of error	Donald Trump Republican	Joe Biden Democratic	Jo Jorgensen Libertarian	Other	Undecided
SurveyMonkey/Axios	Oct 20 – Nov 2, 2020	566 (LV)	± 5.5%	36% (Note: Overlapping sample with the previous SurveyMonkey/Axios poll, but more information available regarding sample size)	62%	-	–	–
SurveyMonkey/Axios	Oct 1–28, 2020	910 (LV)	–	32%	67%	-	–	–
SurveyMonkey/Axios	Sep 1–30, 2020	351 (LV)	–	37%	62%	-	–	0%
SurveyMonkey/Axios	Aug 1–31, 2020	208 (LV)	–	41%	57%	-	–	3%
SurveyMonkey/Axios	Jul 1–31, 2020	253 (LV)	–	39%	60%	-	–	1%
SurveyMonkey/Axios	Jun 8–30, 2020	176 (LV)	–	40%	60%	-	–	1%

=== Results ===
2020 United States presidential election in Rhode Island
Party	Candidate	Votes	%	±%
Democratic	Joe Biden Kamala Harris	307,486	59.39%	+4.98%
Republican	Donald Trump Mike Pence	199,922	38.61%	−0.29%
Libertarian	Jo Jorgensen Spike Cohen	5,053	0.98%	−2.20%
Alliance	Rocky De La Fuente Darcy Richardson	923	0.18%	+0.04%
Socialism and Liberation	Gloria La Riva Sunil Freeman	847	0.16%	N/A
American Solidarity	Brian Carroll Amar Patel	767	0.15%	N/A
Write-in		2,759	0.53%	-1.50%
Total votes		517,757	100.00%	N/A

==== By county ====
County	Joe Biden Democratic		Donald Trump Republican		Various candidates Other parties		Margin		Total votes cast
County	#	%	#	%	#	%	#	%	Total votes cast
Bristol	18,050	63.52%	9,745	34.30%	620	2.18%	8,305	29.22%	28,415
Kent	49,113	52.76%	42,001	45.12%	1,979	2.12%	7,112	7.64%	93,093
Newport	29,486	63.89%	15,722	34.07%	940	2.04%	13,764	29.82%	46,148
Providence	165,012	60.52%	102,551	37.61%	5,104	1.87%	62,461	22.91%	272,667
Washington	44,549	58.57%	29,818	39.20%	1,693	2.23%	14,731	19.37%	76,060
Totals	306,210	59.30%	199,837	38.70%	10,336	2.00%	106,373	20.60%	516,383

Counties that flipped from Republican to Democratic

- Kent (largest municipality: Warwick)

==== By municipality ====
Municipality	Joe Biden Democratic		Donald Trump Republican		Jo Jorgensen Libertarian		Other		Margin		Total votes cast
Municipality	#	%	#	%	#	%	#	%	#	%	Total votes cast
Barrington	7,713	71.2%	2,889	26.7%	113	1.0%	117	1.0%	4,824	44.5%	10,832
Bristol	6,813	58.4%	4,595	39.4%	139	1.2%	110	0.9%	2,218	19.0%	11,657
Burrillville	3,434	40.2%	4,906	57.5%	126	1.5%	72	0.9%	-1,472	-17.3%	8,538
Central Falls	3,073	71.9%	1,113	26.1%	25	0.6%	61	1.4%	1,960	45.8%	4,272
Charlestown	2,909	55.7%	2,198	42.1%	64	1.2%	49	1.0%	711	13.6%	5,220
Coventry	9,123	45.6%	10,461	52.3%	232	1.2%	188	0.9%	-1,338	-6.7%	20,004
Cranston	23,039	56.1%	17,313	42.2%	311	0.8%	390	1.0%	5,726	13.9%	41,053
Cumberland	10,869	55.2%	8,418	42.8%	206	1.0%	185	0.9%	2,451	12.4%	19,678
East Greenwich	5,218	60.3%	3,227	37.3%	104	1.2%	98	1.1%	1,991	23.0%	8,647
East Providence	14,735	63.6%	7,930	34.3%	204	0.9%	284	1.3%	6,805	29.3%	23,153
Exeter	1,974	48.4%	2,009	49.2%	55	1.3%	44	1.1%	-35	-0.8%	4,082
Foster	1,224	42.7%	1,582	55.2%	34	1.2%	25	0.8%	-358	-12.5%	2,865
Glocester	2,638	43.2%	3,351	54.8%	62	1.0%	62	1.0%	-713	-11.6%	6,113
Hopkinton	2,298	47.4%	2,423	50.0%	74	1.5%	51	1.0%	-125	-2.6%	4,846
Jamestown	2,795	68.4%	1,212	29.7%	44	1.1%	33	0.8%	1,583	38.7%	4,084
Johnston	6,838	44.8%	8,222	53.9%	88	0.6%	115	0.8%	-1,384	-9.1%	15,263
Lincoln	6,633	52.3%	5,779	45.6%	130	1.0%	129	1.0%	854	6.7%	12,671
Little Compton	1,524	60.1%	951	37.5%	28	1.1%	32	1.2%	573	22.6%	2,535
Middletown	5,529	64.2%	2,885	33.5%	115	1.3%	79	0.9%	2,644	30.7%	8,608
Narragansett	5,333	59.1%	3,551	39.3%	56	0.6%	90	1.1%	1,782	19.8%	9,030
New Shoreham	748	78.3%	195	20.4%	4	0.4%	8	0.8%	553	57.9%	955
Newport	7,866	73.4%	2,662	24.9%	85	0.8%	99	0.9%	5,204	48.5%	10,712
North Kingstown	10,534	59.9%	6,633	37.7%	203	1.2%	207	1.2%	3,901	22.2%	17,577
North Providence	9,438	56.0%	7,129	42.3%	145	0.9%	139	0.8%	2,309	13.7%	16,851
North Smithfield	3,507	48.7%	3,550	49.3%	85	1.2%	64	0.9%	-43	-0.6%	7,206
Pawtucket	18,053	70.0%	7,257	28.1%	188	0.7%	290	1.2%	10,796	41.9%	25,788
Portsmouth	6,649	60.9%	3,995	36.6%	148	1.4%	125	1.1%	2,654	24.3%	10,917
Providence	45,941	80.4%	10,186	17.8%	346	0.6%	694	1.2%	35,755	62.6%	57,167
Richmond	2,346	48.8%	2,343	48.7%	66	1.4%	53	1.1%	3	0.1%	4,808
Scituate	2,735	40.9%	3,806	57.0%	69	1.0%	73	1.1%	-1,071	-16.1%	6,683
Smithfield	5,566	48.3%	5,744	49.8%	118	1.0%	100	0.9%	-178	-1.5%	11,528
South Kingstown	11,254	67.4%	5,003	30.0%	212	1.3%	219	1.3%	6,251	37.4%	16,688
Tiverton	5,123	55.1%	4,017	43.2%	84	0.9%	68	0.7%	1,106	11.9%	9,292
Warren	3,524	59.5%	2,261	38.2%	74	1.2%	67	1.1%	1,263	21.3%	5,926
Warwick	25,845	55.7%	19,578	42.2%	545	1.2%	473	1.0%	6,267	13.5%	46,441
West Greenwich	1,693	42.3%	2,242	56.0%	41	1.0%	24	0.6%	-549	-13.7%	4,000
West Warwick	7,234	51.7%	6,493	46.4%	143	1.0%	131	0.9%	741	5.3%	14,001
Westerly	7,153	55.6%	5,463	42.5%	127	1.0%	111	0.8%	1,690	13.1%	12,854
Woonsocket	7,289	52.7%	6,265	45.3%	154	1.1%	130	0.9%	1,024	7.4%	13,838
Totals	307,486	59.4%	199,922	38.6%	5,053	1.0%	5,296	1.0%	107,564	20.8%	517,757

==== By congressional district ====
Biden won both congressional districts.

District	Trump	Biden	Representative
1st	34%	64%	David Cicilline
2nd	42%	56%	James Langevin

== Analysis ==
Biden flipped the reliably Democratic Kent County back into the Democratic column, after Trump narrowly flipped it in 2016. Of the fourteen towns that voted for Trump in 2016, Biden flipped back three: Lincoln, Richmond, and West Warwick. Overall, Biden won Rhode Island by 20.8 points, improving on Clinton's 15.5 point win. Rhode Island is the only state in which neither Biden nor Trump broke the all-time Democrat or all-time Republican record for most votes earned in a general election (Lyndon B. Johnson and Dwight D. Eisenhower).

Biden's best towns were Rhode Island's wealthiest (such as Barrington, Jamestown, and East Greenwich) and poorest (such as heavily Latino Central Falls). Trump performed best with middle-income voters. This strength allowed Trump to hold formerly Democratic towns like Johnston, which is largely Catholic and middle-class. According to a post-election voter survey conducted by the Associated Press, Trump carried Catholic voters, 51% to 49%.

Biden became the first Democrat since 1912 to win without the towns of Burrillville and North Smithfield, the first since 1916 to win without Johnston and Smithfield, and the first since 1936 to win without Coventry.

== See also ==
- 2020 Rhode Island elections
- United States presidential elections in Rhode Island
- 2020 United States presidential election
- 2020 Democratic Party presidential primaries
- 2020 Republican Party presidential primaries
- 2020 United States elections
