= 1956 United States presidential election in Rhode Island =

- November 6, 1956

Nominee	Dwight D. Eisenhower	Adlai Stevenson
Party	Republican	Democratic
Home state	Pennsylvania (Note: Although he was born in Texas and grew up in Kansas before his military career, at the time of the 1952 election Eisenhower was president of Columbia University and was, officially, a resident of New York. During his first term as president, he moved his private residence to Gettysburg, Pennsylvania, and officially changed his residency to Pennsylvania.)	Illinois
Running mate	Richard Nixon	Estes Kefauver
Electoral vote	4	0
Popular vote	225,819	161,790
Percentage	58.26%	41.73%

Eisenhower
50–60%
60–70%
70–80%
80–90%
Stevenson
50–60%
President before election
Dwight D. Eisenhower
Republican
Elected President
Dwight D. Eisenhower
Republican

The 1956 United States presidential election in Rhode Island took place on November 6, 1956, as part of the 1956 United States presidential election which was held throughout all contemporary 48 states. Voters chose four representatives, or electors to the Electoral College, who voted for president and vice president.

Rhode Island voted for the Republican nominee, incumbent President Dwight D. Eisenhower of Pennsylvania, over the Democratic nominee, former Governor Adlai Stevenson of Illinois. Eisenhower ran with incumbent Vice President Richard Nixon of California, while Stevenson's running mate was Senator Estes Kefauver of Tennessee.

Eisenhower won Rhode Island by a margin of 16.53%. Eisenhower's 225,819 votes is the most received by a Republican presidential candidate in the state's history. Eisenhower is also the last Republican to carry the state twice, as starting in 1960, Rhode Island would become reliably Democratic. In fact, it has only voted for the party on two more occasions, both amidst 49-state Republican landslides nationally. This is the last time a Republican has won a majority of the votes in Providence County (Nixon won it with a plurality in 1972). This is also the most recent presidential election when Rhode Island would vote more Republican than the nation as a whole, or more Republican than Florida, Kentucky, Louisiana, Michigan, Mississippi, Missouri, Montana, Nevada, New Mexico, North Carolina, Oklahoma, Pennsylvania or Texas. It was the last election until 2024 when Rhode Island voted to the right of Delaware, Oregon or Washington state.

To date, this is the last time that the cities of Central Falls and Pawtucket voted Republican.

== Results ==
1956 United States presidential election in Rhode Island
Party	Candidate	Running mate	Popular vote		Electoral vote	
Party	Candidate	Running mate	Count	%	Count	%
Republican	Dwight David Eisenhower of Pennsylvania (incumbent)	Richard Nixon of California (incumbent)	225,819	58.26%	4	100.00%
Democratic	Adlai Stevenson II of Illinois	Estes Kefauver of Tennessee	161,790	41.73%	0	0.00%
N/A	Others	Others	2	0.01%	0	0.00%
Total			387,611	100.00%	4	100.00%

=== By county ===
County	Dwight D. Eisenhower Republican		Adlai Stevenson Democratic		Various candidates Other parties		Margin		Total votes cast
County	#	%	#	%	#	%	#	%	Total votes cast
Bristol	10,070	59.88%	6,748	40.12%	0	0.00%	3,322	19.76%	16,818
Kent	31,548	65.94%	16,298	34.06%	0	0.00%	15,250	31.88%	47,846
Newport	16,063	63.00%	9,433	37.00%	2	0.00%	6,630	26.00%	25,498
Providence	153,860	55.80%	121,861	44.20%	0	0.00%	31,999	11.60%	275,721
Washington	14,278	65.71%	7,450	34.29%	0	0.00%	6,828	31.42%	21,728
Totals	225,819	58.26%	161,790	41.74%	2	0.00%	64,029	16.52%	387,611

==== Counties flipped from Democratic to Republican ====
- Providence

== See also ==
- United States presidential elections in Rhode Island
