= 1968 United States presidential election in Massachusetts =

- November 5, 1968
- Turnout: 86.16%

Nominee	Hubert Humphrey	Richard Nixon
Party	Democratic	Republican
Home state	Minnesota	New York (Note: Although he was born in California and he served as a U.S. senator from California, in 1968 Richard Nixon's official state of residence was New York, because he moved there to practice law after his defeat in the 1962 California gubernatorial election. During his first term as president, Nixon re-established his residency in California. Consequently, most reliable reference books list Nixon’s home state as New York in the 1968 election and his home state as California in the 1972 (and 1960) election.)
Running mate	Edmund Muskie	Spiro Agnew
Electoral vote	14	0
Popular vote	1,469,218	766,844
Percentage	63.01%	32.89%

Humphrey
40–50%
50–60%
60–70%
70–80%
80–90%
Nixon
40–50%
50–60%
60–70%
70–80%
President before election
Lyndon Johnson
Democratic
Elected President
Richard Nixon
Republican

The 1968 United States presidential election in Massachusetts took place on November 5, 1968, as part of the 1968 United States presidential election, which was held throughout all 50 states and D.C. Voters chose 14 representatives, or electors, to the Electoral College, who voted for president and vice president.

Massachusetts voted overwhelmingly for the Democratic nominee, incumbent Vice President Hubert H. Humphrey of Minnesota, over the Republican nominee, former vice president Richard Nixon of California. Humphrey's running mate was Senator Edmund Muskie of Maine, while Nixon ran with Governor Spiro Agnew of Maryland.

Humphrey carried Massachusetts in a landslide, taking 63.01% of the vote to Nixon’s 32.89%, a Democratic victory margin of 30.12%. This made it the second most Democratic state in the nation, after Rhode Island. The American Independent candidate, Southern populist Governor George Wallace of Alabama, did not have a serious impact on the race. While taking 13.53% nationally and winning electoral votes from five Deep South states, A Boston Globe poll in October had Wallace with 8% support but had collapsed to take only 3.73% of the vote in Massachusetts. Wallace’s base of support was in the South, and he had little appeal in New England states. Massachusetts would be Wallace’s fourth weakest state in the nation.

As Nixon eked out a narrow win of the White House nationally in the Electoral College, Humphrey’s landslide win in Massachusetts made the state a whopping 31% more Democratic than the national average. Massachusetts had been a Democratic-leaning state since 1928, and a Democratic stronghold since 1960 — and the 1960s would prove to be a decade of Democratic dominance in Massachusetts. Prior to 1960, Massachusetts had usually been a swing state, and Republican Dwight D. Eisenhower had carried it by 19 points in 1956. However, in 1960 Massachusetts native John F. Kennedy would become the first Democrat ever to win Massachusetts with over 60% of the vote, taking 60.22%. In the midst of the 1964 nationwide Democratic landslide, President Lyndon B. Johnson had carried the state in a historically massive landslide, taking over 76% of the vote in Massachusetts to Republican Barry Goldwater’s 23%. While Humphrey did not reach Johnson’s level of support, his 63.01% outperformed JFK and remains the third highest vote share any Democratic presidential candidate has ever received in the state — even though Humphrey was losing the election nationally, thus establishing the state’s reputation as a Democratic stronghold in the modern era.

Despite the scale of Humphrey’s statewide landslide, he did not sweep every county in Massachusetts. Humphrey won 10 of the state’s 14 counties, while Nixon won 4. However, Humphrey performed especially well in the most heavily populated parts of the state surrounding the large cities of Boston, Worcester, and Springfield, while Nixon won the lowest populated counties, including Franklin County, Cape Cod, and the islands.

Nevertheless, Nixon became the first Republican ever to win the White House without carrying Norfolk, Essex, Hampshire, Middlesex, Plymouth, and Worcester counties. Four years later, Massachusetts would be the only state in the nation to remain Democratic and vote for George McGovern over Nixon in 1972. Having also voted for John F. Kennedy over Nixon in 1960, Massachusetts would ultimately be the only state in the nation to never vote for Richard Nixon in any of his three presidential campaigns. To date, this is the last time that the towns of Leverett, Shutesbury, and West Tisbury voted Republican.

== Results ==
1968 United States presidential election in Massachusetts
Party	Candidate	Votes	Percentage	Electoral votes
Democratic	Hubert H. Humphrey	1,469,218	63.01%	14
Republican	Richard Nixon	766,844	32.89%	0
American Independent	George Wallace	87,088	3.73%	0
Socialist Labor	Henning A. Blomen	6,180	0.27%	0
Prohibition	E. Harold Munn	2,369	0.10%	0
Write-ins	Write-ins	53	0.00%	0
Totals		2,331,752	100.00%	14
Voter turnout (voting age/registered)				67%/86%

=== Results by county ===
County	Hubert Humphrey Democratic		Richard Nixon Republican		George Wallace American Independent		Various candidates Other parties		Margin		Total votes cast
County	#	%	#	%	#	%	#	%	#	%	Total votes cast
Barnstable	16,546	39.24%	24,296	57.63%	1,242	2.95%	78	0.19%	-7,750	-18.39%	42,162
Berkshire	38,497	59.72%	23,078	35.80%	2,593	4.02%	297	0.46%	15,419	23.92%	64,465
Bristol	119,439	65.06%	56,672	30.87%	6,999	3.81%	459	0.25%	62,767	34.19%	183,569
Dukes	1,540	48.19%	1,576	49.31%	75	2.35%	5	0.16%	-36	-1.12%	3,196
Essex	171,901	61.03%	99,721	35.40%	9,236	3.28%	827	0.29%	72,180	25.63%	281,685
Franklin	12,072	47.55%	12,345	48.63%	893	3.52%	76	0.30%	-273	-1.08%	25,386
Hampden	111,376	62.52%	55,783	31.31%	9,846	5.53%	1,145	0.64%	55,593	31.21%	178,150
Hampshire	26,666	58.72%	16,270	35.83%	2,314	5.10%	162	0.36%	10,396	22.89%	45,412
Middlesex	370,310	64.11%	188,304	32.60%	16,561	2.87%	2,421	0.42%	182,006	31.51%	577,596
Nantucket	744	41.52%	991	55.30%	52	2.90%	5	0.28%	-247	-13.78%	1,792
Norfolk	160,513	60.30%	95,858	36.01%	9,080	3.41%	755	0.28%	64,655	24.29%	266,206
Plymouth	67,771	52.96%	54,644	42.70%	5,342	4.17%	220	0.17%	13,127	10.26%	127,977
Suffolk	203,406	75.62%	48,952	18.20%	15,121	5.62%	1,498	0.56%	154,454	57.42%	268,977
Worcester	168,437	63.52%	88,354	33.32%	7,734	2.92%	654	0.25%	80,083	30.20%	265,179
Totals	1,469,218	63.01%	766,844	32.89%	87,088	3.73%	8,602	0.37%	702,374	30.12%	2,331,752

==== Counties that flipped from Democratic to Republican ====
- Barnstable
- Dukes
- Franklin
- Nantucket

=== Results by congressional district ===
Humphrey won a majority of the vote in all of the state's congressional districts.

District	Humphrey	Nixon	Wallace
1st	57.9%	37.6%	4.5%
2nd	63.7%	31.3%	5%
3rd	62.9%	34.1%	3%
4th	62.5%	34.7%	2.8%
5th	63.5%	33.3%	3.2%
6th	59.9%	37%	3.1%
7th	66.8%	29.9%	3.3%
8th	75.9%	20.5%	3.5%
9th	78%	15.8%	15.8%
10th	58.5%	38.2%	3.3%
11th	65.6%	29.7%	4.7%
12th	53.2%	42.9%	3.8%

== See also ==
- United States presidential elections in Massachusetts
