= Newport County, Rhode Island =

County in Rhode Island, United States

Newport County
- County
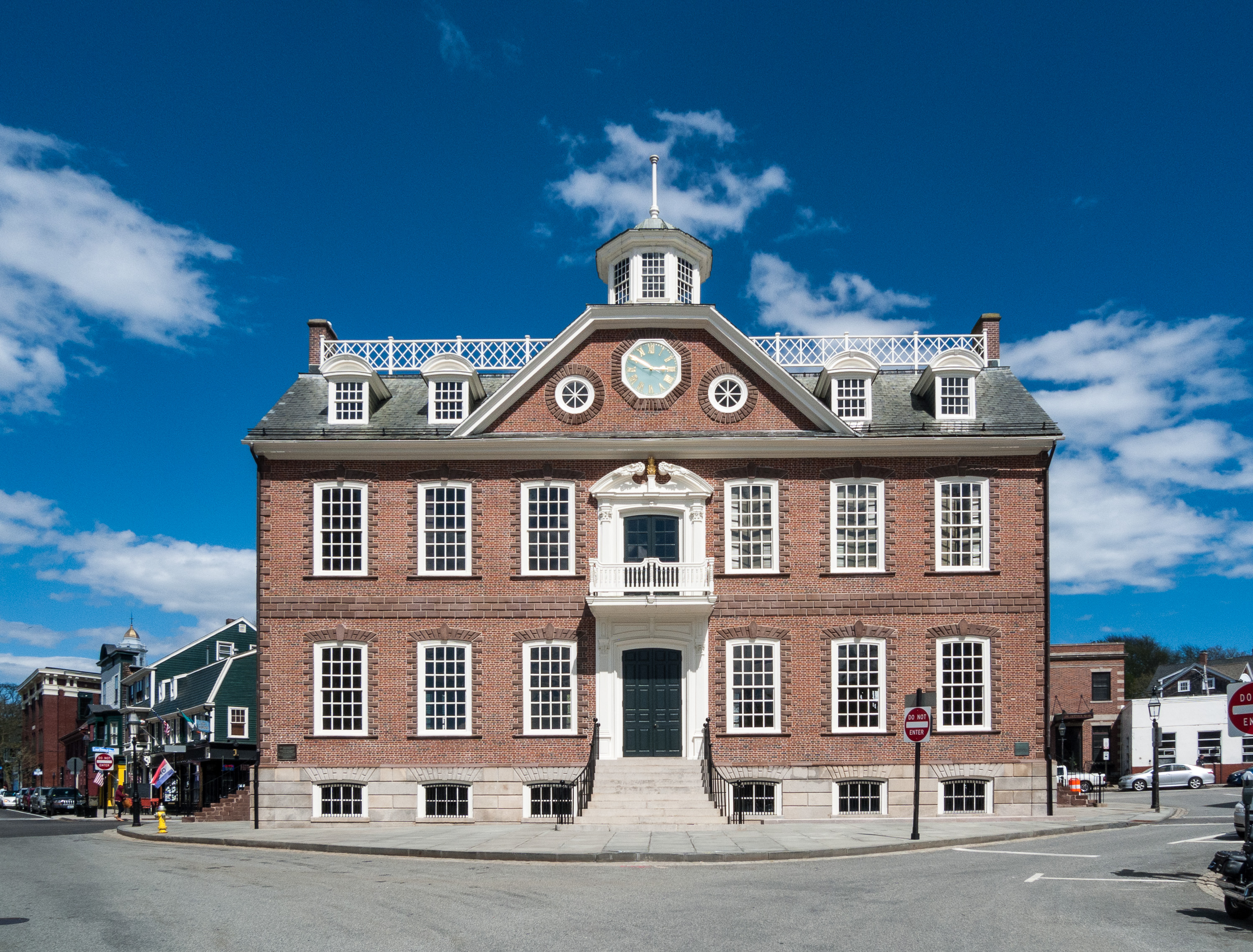
- Old Colony House
- Coordinates: 41.51°N 71.26°W
- Country: United States
- State: Rhode Island
- Region: New England
- Metro area: Providence
- Formed: June 22, 1703; 323 years ago
- Named for: Newport, Essex
- County town: Newport
- Largest city: Newport
- Incorporated municipalities: 6 (total): 1 city, 5 towns

Area
  - Total: 314 sq mi (810 km^{2})
  - Land: 102 sq mi (260 km^{2})
  - Water: 211 sq mi (550 km^{2}) 67%
- Highest elevation: 326 ft (99 m)
- Lowest elevation: 0 ft (0 m)

Population (April 1, 2020)
  - Total: 85,643
  - Estimate (2025): 83,051 ▼
  - Density: 840/sq mi (320/km^{2})

GDP
  - Total: $7.843 billion (2022)
- Time zone: UTC−5 (EST)
  - Summer (DST): UTC−4 (EDT)
- ZIP Code format: 028xx
- Area code: 401
- FIPS code: 44-005
- GNIS feature ID: 1219779
- Congressional district: 1st

Newport County is one of five counties located in the U.S. state of Rhode Island. As of the 2020 census, the population was 85,643. It is also one of the seven regions of Rhode Island. The county was created in 1703. Like all of the counties in Rhode Island, Newport County no longer has any governmental functions (other than as court administrative and sheriff corrections boundaries). All of those functions in Rhode Island are now carried out by the state government, or by the cities and towns of Rhode Island. Newport County is included in the Providence metropolitan area, which in turn constitutes a portion of Greater Boston.

== History ==
Newport County was constituted on June 22, 1703, as one of the two original counties of the Colony of Rhode Island and Providence Plantations. As originally established, Newport County consisted of four towns: Portsmouth, Newport, Jamestown, and New Shoreham. In 1746–1747, two towns, Little Compton and Tiverton, were acquired from Massachusetts. In 1856, the town of Fall River was split off from Tiverton but was ceded to Massachusetts six years later in 1862 as part of the settlement of the boundary dispute between Rhode Island and Massachusetts. In 1963, the town of New Shoreham was transferred to Washington County. County government was abolished in Rhode Island in 1842 and today remains only for the purpose of delineating judicial administrative boundaries.

== Geography ==
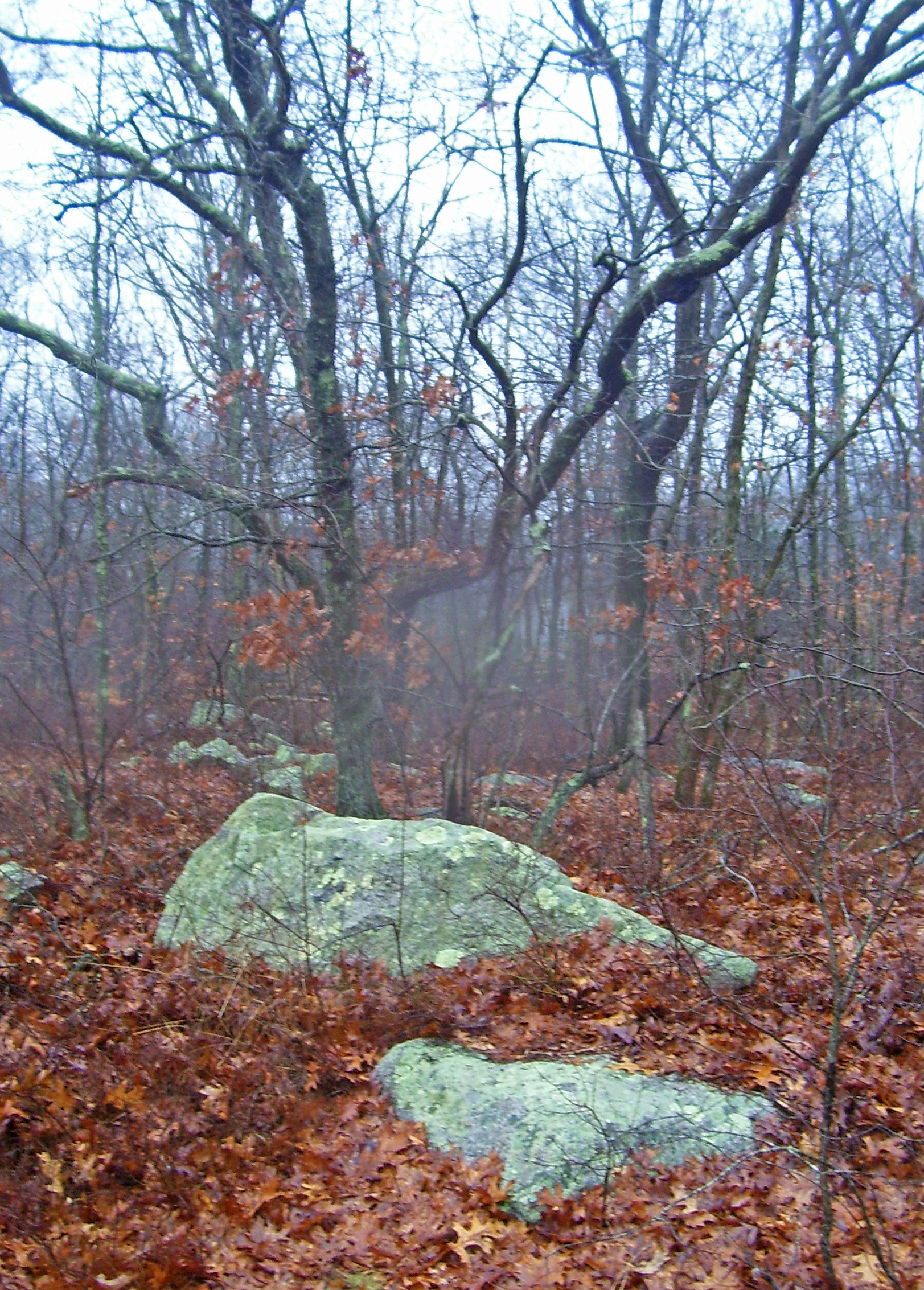
Summit of Pocasset Hill, highest point in the county

According to the U.S. Census Bureau, the county has a total area of 314 square miles (810 km^{2}), of which 102 square miles (260 km^{2}) is land and 211 square miles (550 km^{2}) (67%) is water.

The county consists of Aquidneck Island, Conanicut Island, Prudence Island, and the easternmost portion of the state on the mainland. The highest point in the county is Pocasset Hill, 320 feet (98 m) above sea level, located in Tiverton. The lowest elevation is at sea level.

=== Adjacent counties ===
- Bristol County - north
- Bristol County, Massachusetts - east
- Kent County - northwest
- Washington County - west

=== National protected areas ===
- Sachuest Point National Wildlife Refuge
- Touro Synagogue National Historic Site

=== Major highways ===
- Route 24
- Route 77
- Route 81
- Route 114
- Route 138
- Route 138A
- Route 179
- Route 214
- Route 238

== Demographics ==
Historical population
Census	Pop.	Note	%±
1790	14,351		—
1800	14,845		3.4%
1810	16,294		9.8%
1820	15,771		−3.2%
1830	16,535		4.8%
1840	16,874		2.1%
1850	20,007		18.6%
1860	21,896		9.4%
1870	20,050		−8.4%
1880	24,180		20.6%
1890	28,552		18.1%
1900	32,599		14.2%
1910	39,335		20.7%
1920	42,893		9.0%
1930	41,668		−2.9%
1940	46,696		12.1%
1950	61,539		31.8%
1960	81,891		33.1%
1970	94,559		15.5%
1980	81,383		−13.9%
1990	87,194		7.1%
2000	85,433		−2.0%
2010	82,888		−3.0%
2020	85,643		3.3%
2025 (est.)	83,051	▼	−3.0%
U.S. Decennial Census; 1790-1960 1900-1990; 1990-2000 2010-2019

=== 2020 census ===
As of the 2020 census, the county had a population of 85,643. Of the residents, 17.2% were under the age of 18 and 22.6% were 65 years of age or older; the median age was 45.5 years. For every 100 females there were 95.1 males, and for every 100 females age 18 and over there were 92.9 males. 91.5% of residents lived in urban areas and 8.5% lived in rural areas.

The racial makeup of the county was 84.1% White, 3.3% Black or African American, 0.4% American Indian and Alaska Native, 1.8% Asian, 3.0% from some other race, and 7.3% from two or more races. Hispanic or Latino residents of any race comprised 6.5% of the population.

Newport County, Rhode Island – Racial composition Note: the US Census treats Hispanic/Latino as an ethnic category, and not a racial one. This table treats Hispanic/Latino as a racial category and assigns them to a separate category. All racial categories exclude Hispanics/Latinos in this table. Hispanics/Latinos may be of any race.
Race (NH = Non-Hispanic)	% 2020	% 2010	% 2000	Pop 2020	Pop 2010	Pop 2000
White alone (NH)	82.8%	87.9%	90.1%	70,914	72,836	76,940
Black alone (NH)	3.1%	3.2%	3.5%	2,645	2,645	2,988
American Indian alone (NH)	0.3%	0.3%	0.4%	265	260	310
Asian alone (NH)	1.8%	1.5%	1.2%	1,543	1,263	1,033
Pacific Islander alone (NH)	0.1%	0.1%	0.1%	49	45	47
Other race alone (NH)	0.7%	0.3%	0.3%	599	274	243
Multiracial (NH)	4.7%	2.5%	1.7%	4,036	2,053	1,463
Hispanic/Latino (any race)	6.5%	4.2%	2.8%	5,592	3,512	2,409

The most reported ancestries in 2020 were Irish (26%), English (20.3%), Portuguese (12.4%), Italian (10.8%), German (10.8%), French (8.2%), Scottish (4.5%), Polish (3.8%), African American (2.4%), and Puerto Rican (2%).

There were 36,480 households in the county, of which 23.2% had children under the age of 18 living with them and 29.1% had a female householder with no spouse or partner present. About 33.1% of all households were made up of individuals and 15.4% had someone living alone who was 65 years of age or older.

There were 43,422 housing units, of which 16.0% were vacant. Among occupied housing units, 63.0% were owner-occupied and 37.0% were renter-occupied. The homeowner vacancy rate was 1.4% and the rental vacancy rate was 6.4%.

=== 2010 census ===
As of the 2010 United States census, there were 82,888 people, 34,911 households, and 21,076 families living in the county. The population density was 809.6 inhabitants per square mile (312.6/km^{2}). There were 41,796 housing units at an average density of 408.2 per square mile (157.6/km^{2}). The racial makeup of the county was 90.2% white, 3.5% black or African American, 1.6% Asian, 0.4% American Indian, 0.1% Pacific islander, 1.4% from other races, and 3.0% from two or more races. Those of Hispanic or Latino origin made up 4.2% of the population. The largest ancestry groups were:

- (Republic of Ireland) 25.5% Irish
- (England) 17.4% English
- (Portugal) 16.5% Portuguese
- (Italy) 10.9% Italian
- (Germany) 10.5% German
- (France) 9.4% French
- (Poland) 5.0% Polish
- (Canada) 3.9% French Canadian
- (Scotland) 3.3% Scottish
- (United States) 3.0% American
- (Northern Ireland) 2.1% Scotch-Irish
- (Sweden) 1.8% Swedish
- (Puerto Rico) 1.6% Puerto Rican
- (Russia) 1.4% Russian
- (Netherlands) 1.1% Dutch
- (Greece) 1.0% Greek
- 1.0% Sub-Saharan African

Of the 34,911 households, 26.2% had children under the age of 18 living with them, 46.8% were married couples living together, 10.2% had a female householder with no husband present, 39.6% were non-families, and 32.2% of all households were made up of individuals. The average household size was 2.27 and the average family size was 2.89. The median age was 43.2 years.

The median income for a household in the county was $67,239 and the median income for a family was $82,477. Males had a median income of $58,191 versus $43,623 for females. The per capita income for the county was $36,994. About 4.5% of families and 7.3% of the population were below the poverty line, including 10.4% of those under age 18 and 6.1% of those age 65 or over.

=== 2000 census ===
As of the census of 2000, there were 85,433 people, 35,228 households, and 22,228 families living in the county. The population density was 821 inhabitants per square mile (317/km^{2}). There were 39,561 housing units at an average density of 380 per square mile (150/km^{2}). The racial makeup of the county was 91.46% White, 3.73% Black or African American, 0.43% Native American, 1.23% Asian, 0.07% Pacific Islander, 1.09% from other races, and 1.99% from two or more races. 2.82% of the population were Hispanic or Latino of any race. 19.6% were of Irish, 13.2% Portuguese, 11.8% English, 9.2% Italian, 6.3% German and 5.2% French ancestry. 92.0% spoke English, 2.3% Spanish, 2.1% Portuguese and 1.3% French as their first language.

There were 35,228 households, out of which 28.60% had children under the age of 18 living with them, 49.90% were married couples living together, 10.30% had a female householder with no husband present, and 36.90% were non-families. 29.90% of all households were made up of individuals, and 10.80% had someone living alone who was 65 years of age or older. The average household size was 2.35 and the average family size was 2.95.

In the county, the population was spread out, with 22.50% under the age of 18, 8.40% from 18 to 24, 29.90% from 25 to 44, 24.80% from 45 to 64, and 14.40% who were 65 years of age or older. The median age was 39 years. For every 100 females, there were 94.60 males. For every 100 females age 18 and over, there were 91.40 males.

The median income for a household in the county was $50,448, and the median income for a family was $60,610. Males had a median income of $41,630 versus $29,241 for females. The per capita income for the county was $26,779. About 5.40% of families and 7.10% of the population were below the poverty line, including 9.00% of those under age 18 and 6.70% of those age 65 or over.

== Communities ==
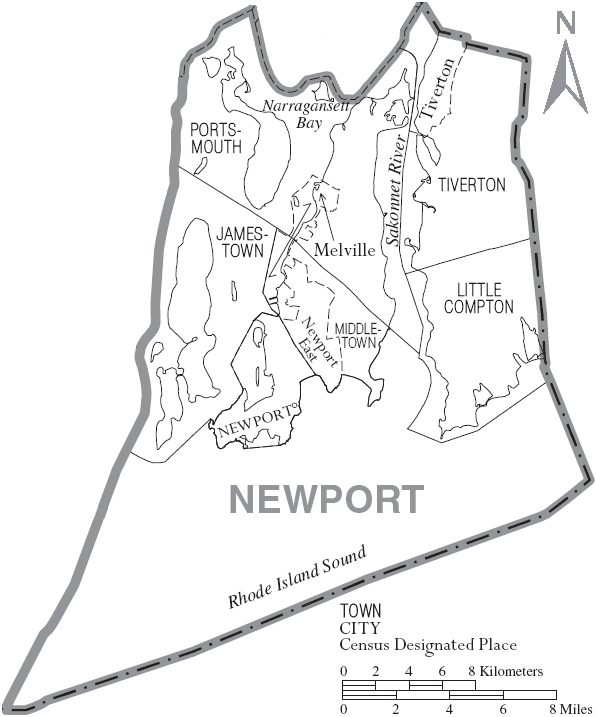
Map of Newport County, Rhode Island showing cities, towns, and CDPs

=== City ===
- Newport

=== Towns ===
- Jamestown
- Little Compton
- Middletown
- Portsmouth
- Tiverton

=== Census-designated places ===
- Melville
- Newport East
- Tiverton

=== Villages ===
Villages have no separate corporate existence from the towns they are in.

- Adamsville
- Bridgeport
- Briggs Point
- Bristol Ferry
- Castle Hill
- Cedar Island
- Cedar Point
- Coasters Harbor
- Coddington Point
- Common Fence Point
- Corey Lane
- Despair Island
- Dutch Island
- Dyer Island
- Eagleville
- Easton Point
- Fogland Point
- Fort Adams
- Forty Steps
- Freebody Hill
- Goat Island
- Gould Island
- Grayville
- Green's End
- Hog Island
- Homestead
- Hope Island
- Hummocks
- Island Park
- Nannaquaket
- North Tiverton
- Ochre Point
- Patience Island
- Prudence Island
- Quaker Hill
- Rose Island
- Sachuest
- Sakonnet
- Tiverton Four Corners
- Tonomy Hill
- Tunipus

== Politics ==
United States presidential election results for Newport County, Rhode Island
Year	Republican		Democratic		Third party(ies)	
Year	No.	%	No.	%	No.	%
1860	1,610	64.68%	879	35.32%	0	0.00%
1880	2,064	67.69%	979	32.11%	6	0.20%
1884	2,040	59.72%	1,205	35.28%	171	5.01%
1888	2,447	58.82%	1,634	39.28%	79	1.90%
1892	2,746	53.52%	2,258	44.01%	127	2.48%
1896	3,415	71.55%	1,092	22.88%	266	5.57%
1900	3,283	63.38%	1,776	34.29%	121	2.34%
1904	3,683	61.05%	2,263	37.51%	87	1.44%
1908	3,639	62.32%	1,949	33.38%	251	4.30%
1912	2,583	39.92%	2,487	38.44%	1,400	21.64%
1916	4,003	56.84%	2,932	41.63%	108	1.53%
1920	9,319	76.72%	2,228	18.34%	599	4.93%
1924	9,608	67.24%	3,975	27.82%	706	4.94%
1928	8,578	55.85%	6,748	43.94%	33	0.21%
1932	8,633	51.89%	7,838	47.11%	165	0.99%
1936	9,358	48.33%	9,499	49.06%	504	2.60%
1940	9,882	48.11%	10,645	51.82%	14	0.07%
1944	9,435	45.29%	11,375	54.61%	21	0.10%
1948	10,756	53.39%	9,254	45.93%	136	0.68%
1952	15,136	57.63%	11,116	42.33%	10	0.04%
1956	16,063	63.00%	9,433	37.00%	2	0.01%
1960	11,942	43.24%	15,677	56.76%	0	0.00%
1964	7,078	26.35%	19,782	73.65%	0	0.00%
1968	10,504	37.74%	16,251	58.39%	1,075	3.86%
1972	19,142	59.75%	12,844	40.09%	49	0.15%
1976	15,155	45.78%	17,768	53.67%	184	0.56%
1980	14,555	42.37%	13,904	40.47%	5,897	17.16%
1984	19,629	57.38%	14,466	42.29%	114	0.33%
1988	16,923	48.82%	17,597	50.76%	144	0.42%
1992	12,386	31.24%	17,584	44.35%	9,674	24.40%
1996	11,500	32.77%	18,951	54.00%	4,645	13.24%
2000	14,258	37.68%	20,790	54.94%	2,790	7.37%
2004	16,622	41.12%	22,992	56.87%	812	2.01%
2008	15,717	37.42%	25,479	60.67%	801	1.91%
2012	15,202	38.53%	23,463	59.47%	787	1.99%
2016	15,077	36.73%	22,851	55.67%	3,117	7.59%
2020	15,722	34.07%	29,486	63.89%	940	2.04%
2024	16,027	35.92%	27,332	61.26%	1,259	2.82%

Gubernatorial elections results

Gubernatorial elections results
Year	Republican	Democratic	Third parties
2022	35.2% 11,397	61.6% 19,964	3.2% 1,037
2018	30.8% 10,346	59.6% 20,014	9.6% 3,211
2014	34.35% 10,122	43.74% 12,888	21.91% 6,458
2010	39.45% 11,885	17.15% 5,165	43.4% 13,074

United States Senate election results for Newport County, Rhode Island1
Year	Republican		Democratic		Third party(ies)	
Year	No.	%	No.	%	No.	%
2024	15,830	36.66%	27,289	63.19%	64	0.15%
2018	12,228	36.24%	21,453	63.58%	61	0.18%
2012	14,224	38.39%	22,774	61.47%	50	0.13%

United States Senate election results for Newport County, Rhode Island2
Year	Republican		Democratic		Third party(ies)	
Year	No.	%	No.	%	No.	%
2020	13,527	30.63%	30,580	69.25%	51	0.12%
2014	8,472	29.18%	20,532	70.71%	33	0.11%

== Education ==
School districts include:

K-12:

- Middletown Public Schools
- Newport Public Schools
- Portsmouth School District
- Tiverton School District

Elementary school

- Jamestown School District
- Little Compton School District

== See also ==
- National Register of Historic Places listings in Newport County, Rhode Island
