= Newport County =

Newport County may refer to:

- Newport County, Rhode Island, United States
- Newport County A.F.C., an association football club based in the city of Newport, Wales
