= 2008 United States presidential election in Rhode Island =

- November 4, 2008
- Turnout: 66.9% ▲4.8 pp

Nominee	Barack Obama	John McCain
Party	Democratic	Republican
Home state	Illinois	Arizona
Running mate	Joe Biden	Sarah Palin
Electoral vote	4	0
Popular vote	296,571	165,391
Percentage	62.86%	35.06%

Obama
40–50%
50–60%
60–70%
70–80%
80–90%
McCain
50–60%
President before election
George W. Bush
Republican
Elected President
Barack Obama
Democratic

The 2008 United States presidential election in Rhode Island took place on November 4, 2008, and was part of the 2008 United States presidential election. Voters chose four representatives, or electors, to the Electoral College, who voted for president and vice president.

Rhode Island was won by Democratic nominee Barack Obama with a 27.8% margin of victory. Prior to the election, all 17 news organizations considered this a state Obama would win, or otherwise considered as a safe blue state. At the time, the last time a Republican had carried this state or any county in it was in 1984, when Ronald Reagan won with about 52% of the vote, largely due to the support of Reagan Democrats.

To date, this is the last time that the town of West Greenwich voted Democratic.

== Primaries ==
- 2008 Rhode Island Democratic presidential primary
- 2008 Rhode Island Republican presidential primary

== Campaign ==
=== Predictions ===
There were 16 news organizations who made state-by-state predictions of the election. Here are their last predictions before election day:

Source	Ranking
D.C. Political Report	Likely D
Cook Political Report	Solid D
The Takeaway	Solid D
Electoral-vote.com	Solid D
Washington Post	Solid D
Politico	Solid D
RealClearPolitics	Solid D
FiveThirtyEight	Solid D
CQ Politics	Solid D
The New York Times	Solid D
CNN	Safe D
NPR	Solid D
MSNBC	Solid D
Fox News	Likely D
Associated Press	Likely D
Rasmussen Reports	Safe D

=== Polling ===
Obama won every single pre-election poll, and each by a double-digit margin of victory. The average of the final three polls showed Obama leading with 51% to 33%.

=== Fundraising ===
John McCain raised a total of $343,965 in the state. Barack Obama raised $1,563,473.

=== Advertising and visits ===
Obama and his interest groups spent $671,623. McCain spent nothing. The Democratic ticket visited the state once, while the Republican ticket did not visit the state at all.

== Analysis ==
Rhode Island had historically supported a Republican candidate until 1928, with the exception of 1912, but has supported Democrats all but four times in the 24 elections that have followed. In 1980, Rhode Island was one of only six states to vote against Ronald Reagan. Reagan did carry Rhode Island in his 49-state victory in 1984—only the third time since Eisenhower that a Republican won the state. However, Reagan's 3.6% margin was his second-closest in the nation, ahead of only his 2.8% margin in neighboring Massachusetts. Despite George H. W. Bush aggressively contesting the state in 1988, Michael Dukakis won it by a fairly convincing 13 points, his best performance. The state has not been seriously contested since then, often giving Democratic presidential nominees their biggest margins. It was Bill Clinton's second-best state in 1996 (behind only Massachusetts) and Al Gore's best state in 2000. In 2004, Rhode Island gave John Kerry more than a 20% margin of victory (the third-highest of any state), with 59.4% of its vote. All but three of Rhode Island's 39 cities and towns voted for the Democratic candidate. The only exceptions were East Greenwich, West Greenwich and Scituate.

This pattern continued in 2008. Rhode Island gave Barack Obama a 27.80% margin of victory with 62.86% of its vote. Rhode Island was Obama's third-strongest state nationwide, only outperforming in Hawaii and Vermont. Every single county in Rhode Island, along with Massachusetts, New Hampshire, Vermont, Connecticut, and Hawaii, voted for the former U.S. senator from Illinois in 2008. Obama also won every town in Rhode Island, with the exception of Scituate, along with both congressional districts. Independent Ralph Nader had one of his best performances here in 2008 obtaining over 1% of the vote.

Having some of the highest taxes in the nation, Rhode Island is considered to be a liberal bastion. In addition, Rhode Island has abolished capital punishment, making it one of 15 states that have done so. Rhode Island abolished the death penalty very early, just after Michigan (the first state to abolish it), and carried out its last execution in the 1840s. At the time of the 2008 presidential election, Rhode Island was one of two states (along with Nevada) in which prostitution was legal (provided it took place indoors).

During the same election, incumbent Democratic U.S. Senator Jack Reed was soundly reelected over Republican Bob Tingle in a landslide three-to-one margin and won every town in the state including Scituate. Reed received 73.07% of the vote while Tingle took in 26.47% (with write-ins obtaining the remaining 0.45%). At the state level, Democrats picked up nine seats in the Rhode Island House of Representatives to augment their supermajority in that chamber.

== Results ==
2008 United States presidential election in Rhode Island
Party	Candidate	Running mate	Votes	Percentage	Electoral votes
Democratic	Barack Obama	Joe Biden	296,571	62.86%	4
Republican	John McCain	Sarah Palin	165,391	35.06%	0
Independent	Ralph Nader	Matt Gonzalez	4,829	1.02%	0
Libertarian	Bob Barr	Wayne Allyn Root	1,382	0.29%	0
Green	Cynthia McKinney	Rosa Clemente	797	0.17%	0
Constitution	Chuck Baldwin	Darrell Castle	675	0.14%	0
Others	Others		2,121	0.45%	0
Totals			471,766	100.00%	4
Voter turnout (voting age population)					58.7%

=== By county ===
County	Barack Obama Democratic		John McCain Republican		Various candidates Other parties		Margin		Total votes cast
County	#	%	#	%	#	%	#	%	Total votes cast
Bristol	16,162	62.39%	9,260	35.75%	483	1.86%	6,902	26.64%	25,905
Kent	48,406	57.58%	33,780	40.18%	1,888	2.24%	14,626	17.40%	84,074
Newport	25,479	60.67%	15,717	37.42%	801	1.91%	9,762	23.25%	41,997
Providence	167,442	66.02%	81,010	31.94%	5,178	2.04%	86,432	34.08%	253,630
Washington	39,082	59.07%	25,624	38.73%	1,454	2.20%	13,458	20.34%	66,160
Totals	296,571	62.86%	165,391	35.06%	9,804	2.08%	131,180	27.80%	471,766

=== By congressional district ===
Obama carried both congressional districts in the state.

District	McCain	Obama	Representative
1st	33.28%	65.10%	Patrick J. Kennedy
2nd	37.02%	61.28%	James Langevin

== Electors ==
Technically the voters of Rhode Island cast their ballots for electors: representatives to the Electoral College. Rhode Island is allocated four electors because it has two congressional districts and two senators. All candidates who appear on the ballot or qualify to receive write-in votes must submit a list of four electors, who pledge to vote for their candidate and their running mate. Whoever wins the majority of votes in the state is awarded all four electoral votes. Their chosen electors then vote for president and vice president. Although electors are pledged to their candidate and running mate, they are not obligated to vote for them. An elector who votes for someone other than their candidate is known as a faithless elector.

The electors of each state and the District of Columbia met on December 15, 2008, to cast their votes for president and vice president. The Electoral College itself never meets as one body. Instead, the electors from each state and the District of Columbia met in their respective capitols.

The following were the members of the Electoral College from the state. All four were pledged to Barack Obama and Joe Biden:

1. Maryellen Goodwin
2. Charlene Lima
3. John McConnell
4. Mark Weiner

== See also ==
- United States presidential elections in Rhode Island
