= Newport East, Rhode Island =

Census-designated place in Rhode Island, United States

Newport East
- CDP
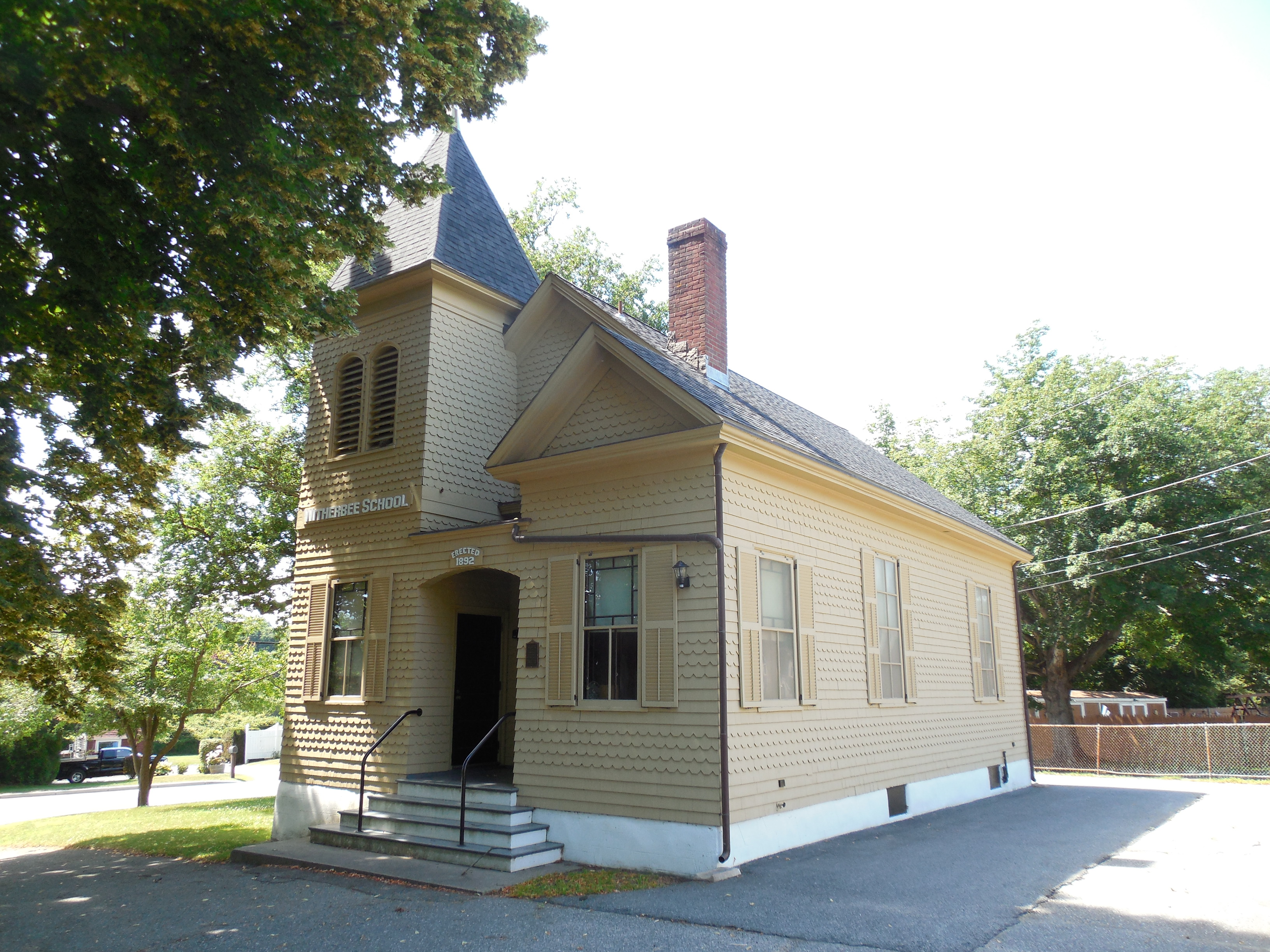
- Witherbee School; Middletown Historical Society

- Location within the state of Rhode Island
- Coordinates: 41°30′31″N 71°17′17″W
- Country: United States
- State: Rhode Island
- County: Newport

Area
  - Total: 5.96 sq mi (15.43 km^{2})
  - Land: 5.75 sq mi (14.90 km^{2})
  - Water: 0.20 sq mi (0.53 km^{2})
- Elevation: 92 ft (28 m)

Population (2020)
  - Total: 12,337
  - Density: 2,144.3/sq mi (827.91/km^{2})
- Time zone: UTC-5 (Eastern (EST))
  - Summer (DST): UTC-4 (EDT)
- FIPS code: 44-50140
- GNIS feature ID: 2378111

Newport East is a census-designated place (CDP) in the town of Middletown, Newport County, Rhode Island, United States. The CDP encompasses the portion of the urban area of the city of Newport that extends beyond the municipal boundaries. As of the 2020 census, Newport East had a population of 12,337.

== Geography ==
Newport East is located at 41°30′31″N 71°17′17″W (41.508602, -71.288093).

According to the United States Census Bureau, the CDP has a total area of 5.9 mi^{2} (15.2 km^{2}), of which 5.7 mi^{2} (14.7 km^{2}) is land and 0.2 mi^{2} (0.5 km^{2}) (3.24%) is water.

== Demographics ==
Historical population
Census	Pop.	Note	%±
1960	2,643		—
1970	10,285		289.1%
1980	11,030		7.2%
1990	11,080		0.5%
2000	11,463		3.5%
2010	11,769		2.7%
2020	12,337		4.8%

=== 2020 census ===
As of the 2020 census, Newport East had a population of 12,337 people, with 5,426 households and 2,989 families. The median age was 44.4 years. 18.7% of residents were under the age of 18 and 22.5% were 65 years of age or older. For every 100 females there were 93.6 males, and for every 100 females age 18 and over there were 90.0 males age 18 and over.

The population density was 2,144.4 per square mile (828.0/km^{2}). There were 6,123 housing units at an average density of 1,064.3 per square mile (410.9/km^{2}). Of all housing units, 11.4% were vacant; the homeowner vacancy rate was 0.5% and the rental vacancy rate was 5.9%.

100.0% of residents lived in urban areas, while 0.0% lived in rural areas.

Of the 5,426 households, 25.1% had children under the age of 18 living in them. Of all households, 41.1% were married-couple households, 20.8% were households with a male householder and no spouse or partner present, and 31.0% were households with a female householder and no spouse or partner present. About 34.7% of all households were made up of individuals, and 15.7% had someone living alone who was 65 years of age or older.

Racial composition as of the 2020 census
Race	Number	Percent
White	9,523	77.2%
Black or African American	697	5.6%
American Indian and Alaska Native	57	0.5%
Asian	415	3.4%
Native Hawaiian and Other Pacific Islander	15	0.1%
Some other race	470	3.8%
Two or more races	1,160	9.4%
Hispanic or Latino (of any race)	992	8.0%

=== Demographic estimates ===
The average household size was 2.2 and the average family size was 2.8. The percent of those with a bachelor's degree or higher was estimated to be 31.9% of the population.

=== Income and poverty ===
The 2016–2020 5-year American Community Survey estimates show that the median household income was $75,036 (with a margin of error of +/- $9,004) and the median family income was $84,719 (+/- $8,041). Males had a median income of $54,611 (+/- $9,615) versus $33,458 (+/- $2,733) for females. The median income for those above 16 years old was $39,745 (+/- $5,505). Approximately, 4.4% of families and 7.4% of the population were below the poverty line, including 10.7% of those under the age of 18 and 12.0% of those ages 65 or over.

=== 2000 census ===
As of the census of 2000, there were 11,463 people, 4,905 households, and 3,011 families residing in the CDP. The population density was 2,019.0/mi^{2} (779.2/km^{2}). There were 5,206 housing units at an average density of 917.0/mi^{2} (353.9/km^{2}). The racial makeup of the CDP was 90.46% White, 4.04% African American, 0.37% Native American, 1.86% Asian, 0.11% Pacific Islander, 0.85% from other races, and 2.31% from two or more races. Hispanic or Latino of any race were 2.17% of the population.

There were 4,905 households, out of which 27.0% had children under the age of 18 living with them, 47.2% were married couples living together, 11.3% had a female householder with no husband present, and 38.6% were non-families. 32.9% of all households were made up of individuals, and 13.4% had someone living alone who was 65 years of age or older. The average household size was 2.28 and the average family size was 2.90.

In the CDP, the population was spread out, with 21.6% under the age of 18, 6.5% from 18 to 24, 28.3% from 25 to 44, 25.4% from 45 to 64, and 18.2% who were 65 years of age or older. The median age was 41 years. For every 100 females, there were 90.6 males. For every 100 females age 18 and over, there were 86.0 males.

The median income for a household in the CDP was $49,552, and the median income for a family was $57,314. Males had a median income of $41,026 versus $28,090 for females. The per capita income for the CDP was $25,193. About 4.1% of families and 5.5% of the population were below the poverty line, including 6.6% of those under the age of 18 and 4.9% of those 65 and older.
