= 1932 United States presidential election in Rhode Island =

- November 8, 1932

| Nominee | Franklin D. Roosevelt | Herbert Hoover |
| Party | Democratic | Republican |
| Home state | New York | California |
| Running mate | John Nance Garner | Charles Curtis |
| Electoral vote | 4 | 0 |
| Popular vote | 146,604 | 115,266 |
| Percentage | 55.08% | 43.31% |

Roosevelt
50–60%
60–70%
Hoover
50–60%
60–70%
70–80%
President before election
Herbert Hoover
Republican
Elected President
Franklin D. Roosevelt
Democratic

The 1932 United States presidential election in Rhode Island took place on November 8, 1932, as part of the 1932 United States presidential election which was held throughout all contemporary 48 states. Voters chose four representatives, or electors to the Electoral College, who voted for president and vice president.

Rhode Island voted for the Democratic nominee, Governor Franklin D. Roosevelt of New York, over Republican nominee, incumbent President Herbert Hoover of California. Roosevelt's running mate was incumbent Speaker of the House John Nance Garner of Texas, while Hoover's running mate was incumbent Vice President Charles Curtis of Kansas.

Roosevelt won Rhode Island by a margin of 11.77%.

== Results ==
1932 United States presidential election in Rhode Island
| Party | Candidate | Running mate | Popular vote | | Electoral vote | |
| Party | Candidate | Running mate | Count | % | Count | % |
|---|---|---|---|---|---|---|
| Democratic | Franklin Delano Roosevelt of New York | John Nance Garner of Texas | 146,604 | 55.08% | 4 | 100.00% |
| Republican | Herbert Hoover of California (incumbent) | Charles Curtis of Kansas (incumbent) | 115,266 | 43.31% | 0 | 0.00% |
| Socialist | Norman Thomas of New York | James Hudson Maurer of Pennsylvania | 3,138 | 1.18% | 0 | 0.00% |
| Communist | William Z. Foster of Massachusetts | James W. Ford of Alabama | 546 | 0.21% | 0 | 0.00% |
| Socialist Labor | Verne L. Reynolds of New York | John W. Aiken of Massachusetts | 433 | 0.16% | 0 | 0.00% |
| Prohibition | William David Upshaw of Georgia | Frank S. Regan of Illinois | 183 | 0.07% | 0 | 0.00% |
| Total | | | 266,170 | 100.00% | 4 | 100.00% |

=== By county ===
United States presidential election in Rhode Island (by county)
| County | Franklin D. Roosevelt Democratic | | Herbert Hoover Republican | | Other candidates Various parties | | Margin | | Total |
| County | % | # | % | # | % | # | % | # | # |
|---|---|---|---|---|---|---|---|---|---|
| Bristol | 54.9% | 4,775 | 44.0% | 3,833 | 1.1% | 95 | 10.9% | 942 | 8,703 |
| Kent | 47.7% | 10,398 | 50.9% | 11,096 | 1.3% | 286 | -3.2% | -698 | 21,780 |
| Newport | 47.1% | 7,838 | 51.9% | 8,633 | 1.0% | 165 | -4.8% | -795 | 16,636 |
| Providence | 57.4% | 118,546 | 40.9% | 84,397 | 1.7% | 3,601 | 16.5% | 34,149 | 206,544 |
| Washington | 40.4% | 5,047 | 58.4% | 7,307 | 1.2% | 153 | -18.0% | -2,260 | 12,507 |

== See also ==
- United States presidential elections in Rhode Island
