= 1936 United States presidential election in Rhode Island =

- November 3, 1936

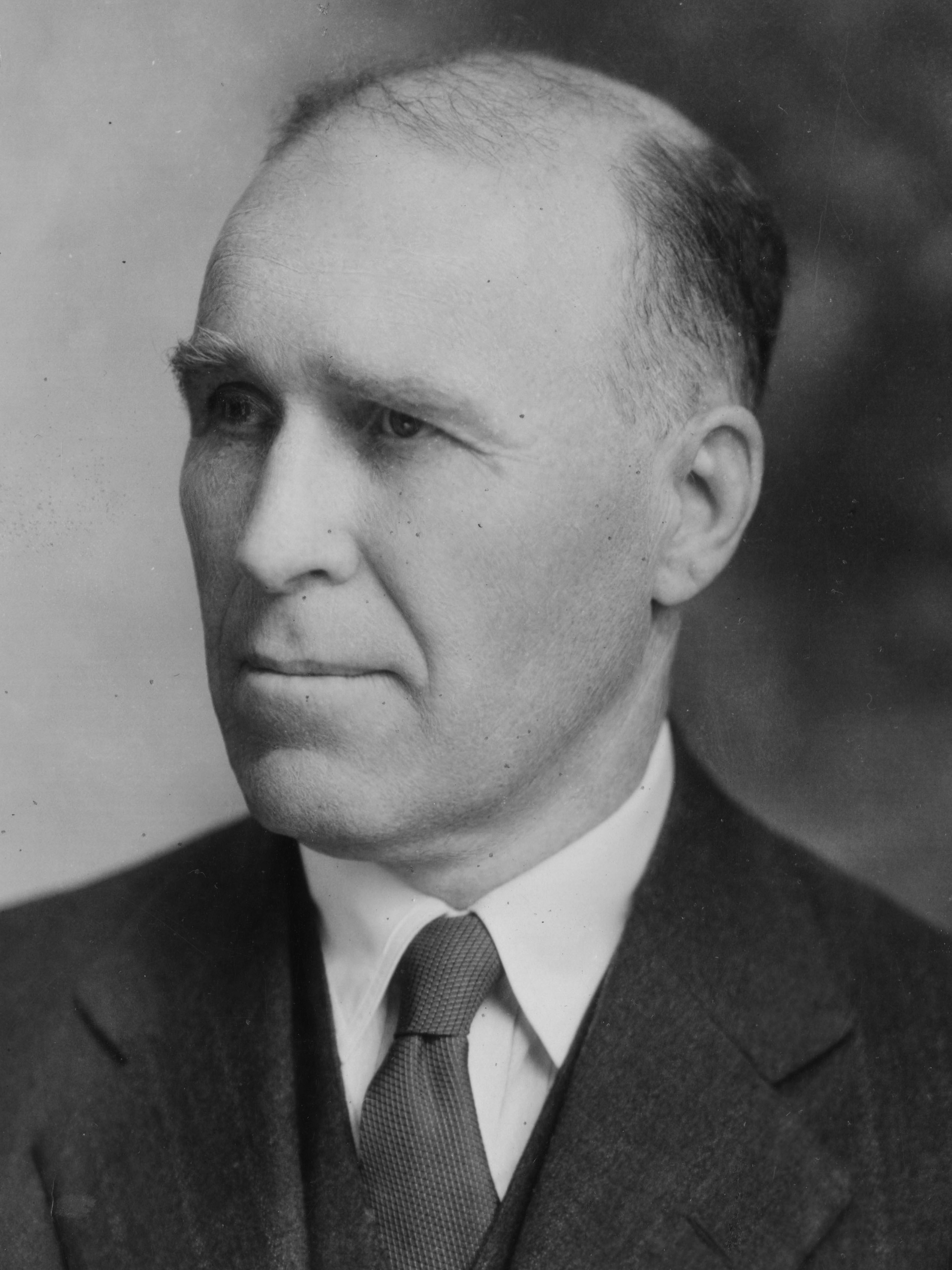
Nominee	Franklin D. Roosevelt	Alf Landon	William Lemke
Party	Democratic	Republican	Union
Home state	New York	Kansas	North Dakota
Running mate	John Nance Garner	Frank Knox	Thomas C. O'Brien
Electoral vote	4	0	0
Popular vote	165,238	125,031	19,569
Percentage	53.10%	40.18%	6.29%

Roosevelt
40–50%
50–60%
60–70%
70–80%
Landon
40–50%
50–60%
60–70%
70–80%
President before election
Franklin D. Roosevelt
Democratic
Elected President
Franklin D. Roosevelt
Democratic

The 1936 United States presidential election in Rhode Island was held on November 3, 1936. The state voters chose four electors to the Electoral College, who voted for president and vice president.

Rhode Island voted for Democratic Party candidate and incumbent President Franklin D. Roosevelt, who won the state by a margin of 12.92%. Roosevelt was the first Democrat to ever win Newport County.

== Results ==
1936 United States presidential election in Rhode Island
Party	Candidate	Running mate	Popular vote		Electoral vote	
Party	Candidate	Running mate	Count	%	Count	%
Democratic	Franklin Delano Roosevelt of New York	John Nance Garner of Texas	165,238	53.10%	4	100.00%
Republican	Alf Landon of Kansas	Frank Knox of Illinois	125,031	40.18%	0	0.00%
Union	William Lemke of North Dakota	Thomas C. O'Brien of Massachusetts	19,569	6.29%	0	0.00%
Socialist Labor	John W. Aiken of Connecticut	Emil F. Teichert of New York	929	0.30%	0	0.00%
Communist	Earl Russell Browder of Kansas	James W. Ford of New York	411	0.13%	0	0.00%
Total			311,178	100.00%	4	100.00%

=== By county ===
1936 United States presidential election in Rhode Island (by county)
County	Franklin D. Roosevelt Democratic		Alf Landon Republican		Other candidates Various parties		Margin		Total
County	%	#	%	#	%	#	%	#	#
Bristol	49.96%	5,327	45.65%	4,867	4.4%	468	4.31%	460	10,662
Kent	47.2%	13,238	48.4%	13,550	4.4%	1,231	-1.2%	-312	28,019
Newport	49.1%	9,499	48.3%	9,358	2.6%	504	0.8%	141	19,361
Providence	55.1%	131,218	37.2%	88,492	7.7%	18,370	17.9%	42,726	238,080
Washington	39.6%	5,956	58.2%	8,764	2.2%	336	-18.6%	-2,808	15,056

==== Counties that flipped from Republican to Democratic ====
- Newport

== See also ==
- United States presidential elections in Rhode Island
