= 1952 United States presidential election in Rhode Island =

- November 4, 1952

Nominee	Dwight D. Eisenhower	Adlai Stevenson
Party	Republican	Democratic
Home state	New York	Illinois
Running mate	Richard Nixon	John Sparkman
Electoral vote	4	0
Popular vote	210,935	203,293
Percentage	50.89%	49.05%

Eisenhower
50–60%
60–70%
70–80%
Stevenson
50–60%
60–70%
President before election
Harry S. Truman
Democratic
Elected President
Dwight D. Eisenhower
Republican

The 1952 United States presidential election in Rhode Island took place on November 4, 1952, as part of the 1952 United States presidential election which was held throughout all contemporary 48 states. Voters chose four representatives, or electors to the Electoral College, who voted for president and vice president.

Rhode Island voted for the Republican nominee, General Dwight D. Eisenhower of New York, over the Democratic nominee, former Governor Adlai Stevenson of Illinois. Eisenhower ran with Senator Richard Nixon of California, while Stevenson's running mate was Senator John Sparkman of Alabama.

Eisenhower won Rhode Island by a very narrow margin of 1.85%. As a result of this, he became the first Republican candidate since Calvin Coolidge in 1924 to win the state. This is the last time that a non incumbent Republican won Rhode Island.

== Results ==
1952 United States presidential election in Rhode Island
Party	Candidate	Running mate	Popular vote		Electoral vote	
Party	Candidate	Running mate	Count	%	Count	%
Republican	Dwight David Eisenhower of New York	Richard Nixon of California	210,935	50.89%	4	100.00%
Democratic	Adlai Stevenson II of Illinois	John Jackson Sparkman of Alabama	203,293	49.05%	0	0.00%
Progressive	Vincent Hallinan of California	Charlotta Amanda Bass of New York	187	0.05%	0	0.00%
Socialist Labor	Eric Hass of New York	Stephen Emery of New York	83	0.02%	0	0.00%
Total			414,498	100.00%	4	100.00%

=== By county ===
County	Dwight D. Eisenhower Republican		Adlai Stevenson Democratic		Various candidates Other parties		Margin		Total votes cast
County	#	%	#	%	#	%	#	%	Total votes cast
Bristol	8,468	50.44%	8,313	49.51%	8	0.05%	155	0.93%	16,789
Kent	27,745	60.85%	17,824	39.09%	24	0.06%	9,921	21.76%	45,593
Newport	15,136	57.63%	11,116	42.33%	10	0.04%	4,020	15.30%	26,262
Providence	146,197	48.09%	157,592	51.84%	219	0.07%	-11,395	-3.75%	304,008
Washington	13,389	61.29%	8,448	38.67%	9	0.04%	4,941	22.62%	21,846
Totals	210,935	50.89%	203,293	49.05%	270	0.06%	7,642	1.84%	414,498

==== Counties flipped from Democratic to Republican ====
- Bristol

== See also ==
- United States presidential elections in Rhode Island
