= 1948 United States presidential election in Rhode Island =

- November 2, 1948

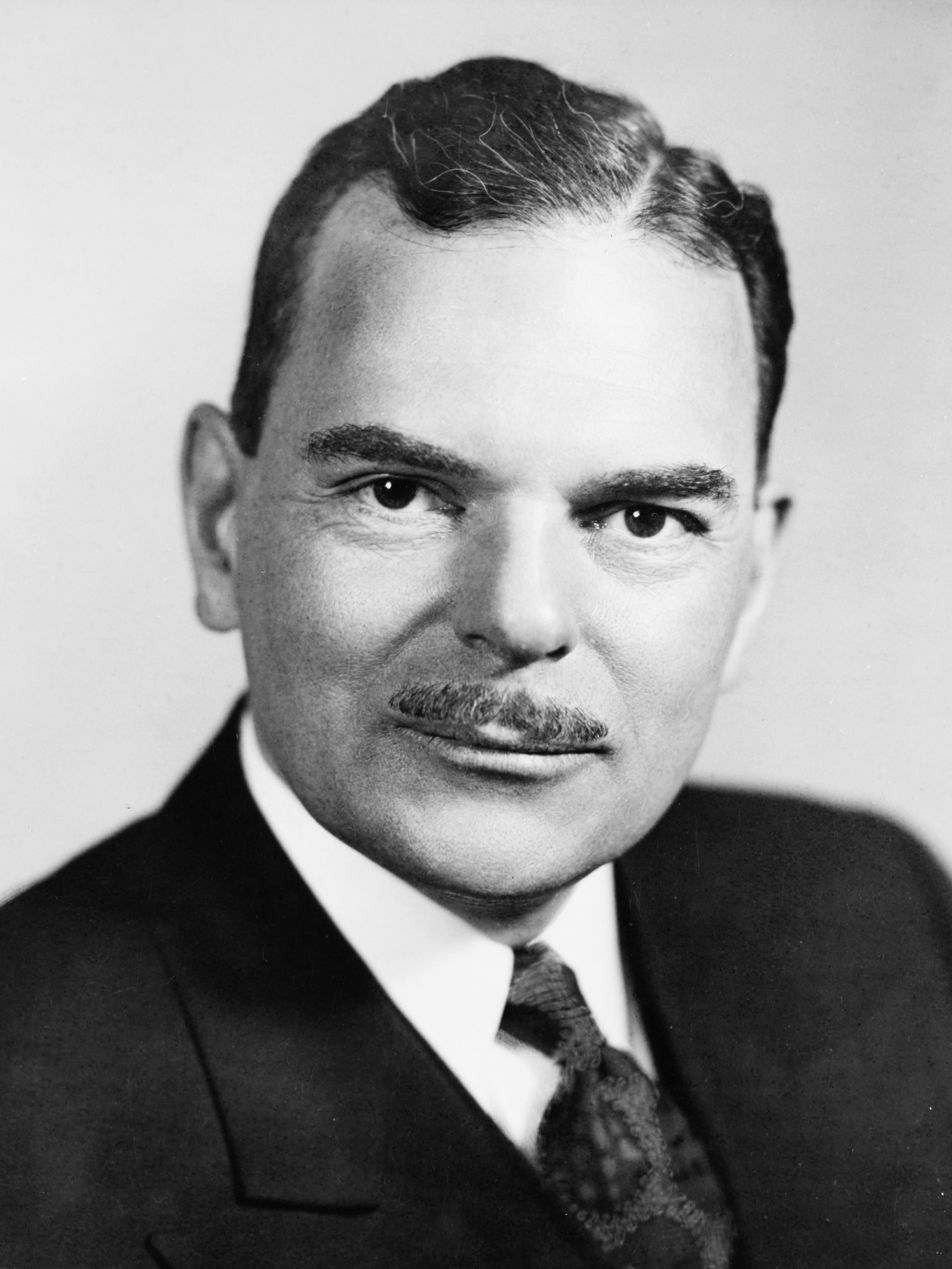
Nominee	Harry S. Truman	Thomas E. Dewey
Party	Democratic	Republican
Home state	Missouri	New York
Running mate	Alben William Barkley	Earl Warren
Electoral vote	4	0
Popular vote	188,736	135,787
Percentage	57.59%	41.44%

Truman
50–60%
60–70%
70–80%
Dewey
50–60%
60–70%
70–80%
President before election
Harry S. Truman
Democratic
Elected President
Harry S. Truman
Democratic

The 1948 United States presidential election in Rhode Island took place on November 2, 1948, as part of the 1948 United States presidential election. State voters chose four electors to the Electoral College, which selected the president and vice president.

Rhode Island was won by Democratic candidate, incumbent President Harry S. Truman of Missouri, over the Republican candidate, Governor Thomas E. Dewey of New York. Truman ran with Senator Alben W. Barkley of Kentucky as his running mate, while Dewey ran with Governor Earl Warren of California as his running mate.

Truman won Rhode Island by a margin of 16.15%.

== Results ==
1948 United States presidential election in Rhode Island
Party	Candidate	Running mate	Popular vote		Electoral vote	
Party	Candidate	Running mate	Count	%	Count	%
Democratic	Harry S. Truman of Missouri	Alben William Barkley of Kentucky	188,736	57.59%	4	100.00%
Republican	Thomas Edmund Dewey of New York	Earl Warren of California	135,787	41.44%	0	0.00%
Progressive	Henry Agard Wallace of Iowa	Glen Hearst Taylor of Idaho	2,619	0.80%	0	0.00%
Socialist	Norman Thomas of New York	Tucker Powell Smith of Michigan	429	0.13%	0	0.00%
Socialist Labor	Edward A. Teichert of Pennsylvania	Stephen Emery of New York	131	0.04%	0	0.00%
Total			327,702	100.00%	4	100.00%

=== By county ===
County	Harry S. Truman Democratic		Thomas E. Dewey Republican		Various candidates Other parties		Margin		Total votes cast
County	#	%	#	%	#	%	#	%	Total votes cast
Bristol	7,562	58.25%	5,343	41.16%	77	0.59%	2,219	17.09%	12,982
Kent	15,287	48.10%	16,299	51.28%	199	0.62%	-1,012	-3.18%	31,785
Newport	9,254	45.93%	10,756	53.39%	136	0.68%	-1,502	-7.46%	20,146
Providence	149,254	60.73%	93,867	38.20%	2,627	1.07%	55,387	22.53%	245,748
Washington	7,379	43.30%	9,522	55.88%	140	0.82%	-2,143	-12.58%	17,041
Totals	188,736	57.59%	135,787	41.44%	3,179	0.97%	52,949	16.15%	327,702

==== Counties that flipped from Democratic to Republican ====
- Kent
- Newport

== See also ==
- United States presidential elections in Rhode Island
