= 1976 United States presidential election in Rhode Island =

- November 2, 1976
- Turnout: 76.4%

Nominee	Jimmy Carter	Gerald Ford
Party	Democratic	Republican
Home state	Georgia	Michigan
Running mate	Walter Mondale	Bob Dole
Electoral vote	4	0
Popular vote	227,636	181,249
Percentage	55.36%	44.08%

Carter
40–50%
50–60%
60–70%
Ford
40–50%
50–60%
60–70%
President before election
Gerald Ford
Republican
Elected President
Jimmy Carter
Democratic

The 1976 United States presidential election in Rhode Island took place on November 2, 1976, as part of the 1976 United States presidential election. Voters chose four representatives, or electors, to the Electoral College, who voted for president and vice president.

Rhode Island was won by Jimmy Carter (D–Georgia), with 55.36% of the popular vote. Carter defeated incumbent President Gerald Ford (R–Michigan), who finished with 44.08% of the popular vote. No third-party candidate received any votes.

Jimmy Carter went on to become the 39th president of the United States.

== Results ==
1976 United States presidential election in Rhode Island
Party	Candidate	Votes	%
Democratic	Jimmy Carter	227,636	55.36%
Republican	Gerald Ford (inc.)	181,249	44.08%
Write-In		2,285	0.56%
Total votes		411,170	100%

=== By county ===
County	Jimmy Carter Democratic		Gerald Ford Republican		Various candidates Other parties		Margin		Total votes cast
County	#	%	#	%	#	%	#	%	Total votes cast
Bristol	11,228	52.41%	10,131	47.29%	66	0.30%	1,097	5.12%	21,425
Kent	35,855	51.07%	34,131	48.61%	227	0.32%	1,724	2.46%	70,213
Newport	17,768	53.67%	15,155	45.78%	184	0.55%	2,613	7.89%	33,107
Providence	144,805	57.96%	103,976	41.62%	1,036	0.42%	40,829	16.34%	249,817
Washington	17,980	49.91%	17,856	49.57%	186	0.52%	124	0.34%	36,022
Totals	227,636	55.36%	181,249	44.08%	2,285	0.56%	46,387	11.28%	411,170

==== Counties flipped from Republican to Democratic ====
All 5 counties

- Bristol
- Kent
- Providence
- Newport
- Washington

== See also ==
- United States presidential elections in Rhode Island
