= 1992 United States presidential election in Rhode Island =

- November 3, 1992
- Turnout: 76.6% ▲6.4 pp

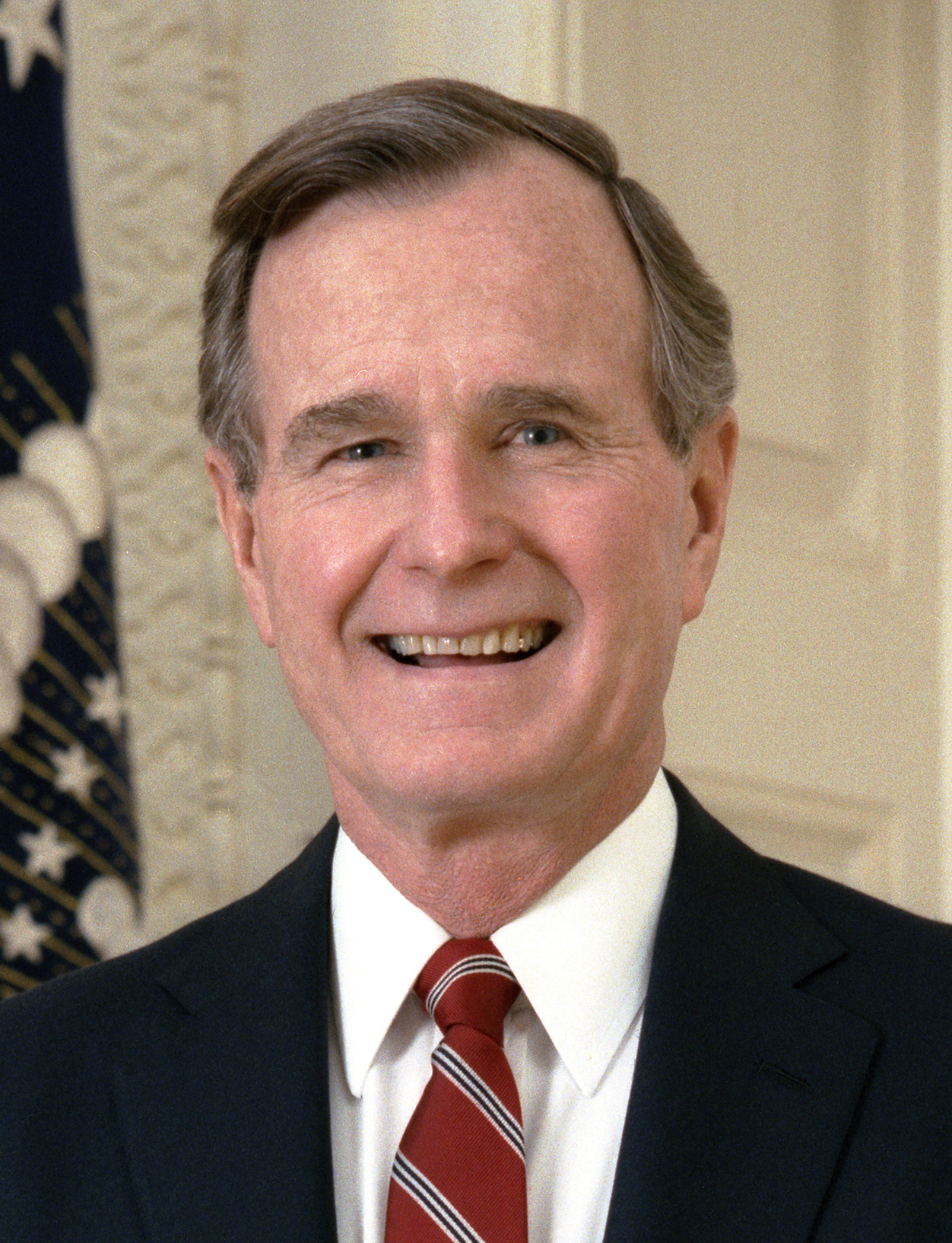

Nominee	Bill Clinton	George H. W. Bush	Ross Perot
Party	Democratic	Republican	Independent
Home state	Arkansas	Texas	Texas
Running mate	Al Gore	Dan Quayle	James Stockdale
Electoral vote	4	0	0
Popular vote	213,299	131,601	105,045
Percentage	47.04%	29.02%	23.16%

Clinton
30–40%
40–50%
50–60%
60–70%
Bush
30–40%
40–50%
President before election
George H. W. Bush
Republican
Elected President
Bill Clinton
Democratic

The 1992 United States presidential election in Rhode Island took place on November 3, 1992, as part of the 1992 United States presidential election. Voters chose four representatives, or electors to the Electoral College, who voted for president and vice president.

Rhode Island was won by Governor Bill Clinton (D-Arkansas) with 47.04% of the popular vote over incumbent President George H. W. Bush (R-Texas) with 29.02%. Businessman Ross Perot (I-Texas) finished in third, with 23.16% of the popular vote. Clinton ultimately won the national vote, defeating incumbent President Bush.

== Results ==
1992 United States presidential election in Rhode Island
Party	Candidate	Votes	Percentage	Electoral votes
Democratic	Bill Clinton	213,299	47.04%	4
Republican	George H. W. Bush (incumbent)	131,601	29.02%	0
Independent	Ross Perot	105,045	23.16%	0
New Alliance	Lenora Fulani	1,878	0.41%	0
Libertarian	Andre Marrou	571	0.13%	0
Ind. For LaRouche	Lyndon LaRouche	494	0.11%	0
Natural Law	John Hagelin	262	0.06%	0
U.S. Taxpayers'	Howard Phillips	215	0.05%	0
Write-in	James Bo Gritz	3	0.00%	0
Write-in	J. Quinn Brisben	2	0.00%	0
Write-in	Ronald Daniels	1	0.00%	0
N/A	Write-ins	106	0.02%	0
Totals		453,477	100.0%	4

=== By county ===
County	Bill Clinton Democratic		George H. W. Bush Republican		Various candidates Other parties		Margin		Total votes cast
County	#	%	#	%	#	%	#	%	Total votes cast
Bristol	11,414	45.82%	8,208	32.95%	5,289	21.23%	3,206	12.87%	24,911
Kent	35,934	43.60%	25,217	30.59%	21,274	25.81%	10,717	13.01%	82,245
Newport	17,584	44.35%	12,386	31.24%	9,674	24.41%	5,198	13.11%	39,644
Providence	125,358	49.46%	69,579	27.45%	58,504	23.09%	55,779	22.01%	253,441
Washington	23,009	43.46%	16,211	30.62%	13,724	25.92%	6,798	12.84%	52,944
Totals	213,299	47.04%	131,601	29.02%	108,578	23.94%	81,698	18.02%	453,478

== See also ==
- United States presidential elections in Rhode Island
