= 1996 United States presidential election in Rhode Island =

- November 5, 1996
- Turnout: 64.8% ▼11.8 pp

Nominee	Bill Clinton	Bob Dole	Ross Perot
Party	Democratic	Republican	Reform
Home state	Arkansas	Kansas	Texas
Running mate	Al Gore	Jack Kemp	Patrick Choate
Electoral vote	4	0	0
Popular vote	233,050	104,683	43,723
Percentage	59.71%	26.82%	11.20%

Clinton
40–50%
50–60%
60–70%
70–80%
Dole
40–50%
President before election
Bill Clinton
Democratic
Elected President
Bill Clinton
Democratic

The 1996 United States presidential election in Rhode Island took place on November 5, 1996, as part of the 1996 United States presidential election. Voters chose four representatives, or electors to the Electoral College, who voted for president and vice president.

Rhode Island was won by President Bill Clinton (D) over Senator Bob Dole (R-KS), with Clinton winning 59.71% to 26.82% by a margin of 32.89%. Billionaire businessman Ross Perot (Reform Party of the United States of America-TX) finished in third, with 11.20% of the popular vote.

As of 2024, this was the most recent presidential election in which the town of Scituate voted for a Democrat.

== Results ==
1996 United States presidential election in Rhode Island
Party	Candidate	Running mate	Votes	Percentage	Electoral votes
Democratic	Bill Clinton (incumbent)	Al Gore (incumbent)	233,050	59.71%	4
Republican	Bob Dole	Jack Kemp	104,683	26.82%	0
Reform	Ross Perot	Patrick Choate	43,723	11.20%	0
Green	Ralph Nader	Winona LaDuke	6,040	1.55%	0
Libertarian	Harry Browne	Jo Jorgensen	1,109	0.28%	0
U.S. Taxpayers' Party	Howard Phillips	Herbert Titus	1,021	0.26%	0
Natural Law	Dr. John Hagelin	Dr. V. Tompkins	435	0.11%	0
Workers World Party	Monica Moorehead	Gloria La Riva	186	0.05%	0
No party	Write-in		37	0.01%	0

=== By county ===
County	Bill Clinton Democratic		Bob Dole Republican		Various candidates Other parties		Margin		Total votes cast
County	#	%	#	%	#	%	#	%	Total votes cast
Bristol	12,257	56.56%	6,988	32.25%	2,426	11.19%	5,269	24.31%	21,671
Kent	41,048	57.35%	19,992	27.95%	10,516	14.70%	21,056	29.40%	71,526
Newport	18,951	54.00%	11,500	32.77%	4,645	13.23%	7,451	21.23%	35,096
Providence	134,866	63.58%	49,901	23.52%	27,355	12.90%	84,965	40.06%	212,122
Washington	25,958	52.09%	16,302	32.71%	7,572	15.20%	9,656	19.38%	49,462
Totals	233,050	59.71%	104,683	26.82%	52,551	13.47%	128,367	32.89%	390,284

== See also ==
- United States presidential elections in Rhode Island
