= 1960 United States presidential election in Rhode Island =

- November 8, 1960

Nominee	John F. Kennedy	Richard Nixon
Party	Democratic	Republican
Home state	Massachusetts	California
Running mate	Lyndon B. Johnson	Henry Cabot Lodge Jr.
Electoral vote	4	0
Popular vote	258,032	147,502
Percentage	63.63%	36.36%

Kennedy
50–60%
60–70%
70–80%
Nixon
50–60%
60–70%
President before election
Dwight D. Eisenhower
Republican
Elected President
John F. Kennedy
Democratic

The 1960 United States presidential election in Rhode Island took place on November 8, 1960, as part of the 1960 United States presidential election, which was held throughout all 50 states. Voters chose four representatives, or electors to the Electoral College, who voted for president and vice president.

Rhode Island voted for the Democratic nominee, Senator John F. Kennedy of Massachusetts, over the Republican nominee, Vice President Richard Nixon of California. Kennedy ran with Senate Majority Leader Lyndon B. Johnson of Texas, while Nixon's running mate was Ambassador Henry Cabot Lodge Jr. of Massachusetts.

Kennedy carried Rhode Island by a margin of 27.27%, making it his strongest state.

== Results ==
1960 United States presidential election in Rhode Island
Party	Candidate	Votes	Percentage	Electoral votes
Democratic	John F. Kennedy	258,032	63.63%	4
Republican	Richard Nixon	147,502	36.36%	0
Write-ins	Write-ins	1	0.01%	0
Totals		405,535	100.00%	4

=== By county ===
County	John F. Kennedy Democratic		Richard Nixon Republican		Various candidates Other parties		Margin		Total votes cast
County	#	%	#	%	#	%	#	%	Total votes cast
Bristol	11,099	59.56%	7,537	40.44%	0	0.00%	3,562	19.12%	18,636
Kent	30,662	55.74%	24,344	44.26%	0	0.00%	6,318	11.48%	55,006
Newport	15,677	56.76%	11,942	43.24%	0	0.00%	3,735	13.52%	27,619
Providence	189,014	67.49%	91,028	32.51%	1	0.00%	97,986	34.98%	280,043
Washington	11,580	47.79%	12,651	52.21%	0	0.00%	-1,071	-4.42%	24,231
Totals	258,032	63.63%	147,502	36.37%	1	0.00%	110,530	27.26%	405,535

==== Counties flipped from Republican to Democratic ====
- Bristol
- Kent
- Providence
- Newport

== See also ==
- United States presidential elections in Rhode Island
