= 1968 United States presidential election in Rhode Island =

- November 5, 1968

| Nominee | Hubert Humphrey | Richard Nixon |
| Party | Democratic | Republican |
| Home state | Minnesota | New York (Note: Although he was born in California and he served as a U.S. senator from California, in 1968 Richard Nixon’s official state of residence was New York, because he moved there to practice law after his defeat in the 1962 California gubernatorial election. During his first term as president, Nixon re-established his residency in California. Consequently, most reliable reference books list Nixon's home state as New York in the 1968 election and his home state as California in the 1972 (and 1960) election.) |
| Running mate | Edmund Muskie | Spiro Agnew |
| Electoral vote | 4 | 0 |
| Popular vote | 246,518 | 122,359 |
| Percentage | 64.03% | 31.78% |

Humphrey
40–50%
50–60%
60–70%
70–80%
Nixon
40–50%
50–60%
60–70%
President before election
Lyndon B. Johnson
Democratic
Elected President
Richard Nixon
Republican

The 1968 United States presidential election in Rhode Island took place on November 5, 1968, as part of the 1968 United States presidential election. Voters chose four representatives, or electors, to the Electoral College, who voted for president and vice president.

Rhode Island was won by the Democratic candidate, Vice President Hubert Humphrey, with 64.03% of the popular vote, against the Republican candidate, former Senator and Vice President Richard Nixon, with 31.78% of the popular vote. American Independent Party candidate George Wallace also appeared on the ballot, finishing with 4.07% of the popular vote. Despite the state trending 30 points Republican after setting a record in 1964, the state continued to overwhelmingly vote for the Democratic candidate.

Nixon was the first Republican to win the presidency without gaining the majority vote in Washington, Kent, and Newport counties.

== Results ==
1968 United States presidential election in Rhode Island
| Party | Candidate | Votes | % |
|---|---|---|---|
| Democratic | Hubert Humphrey | 246,518 | 64.03% |
| Republican | Richard Nixon | 122,359 | 31.78% |
| American Independent | George Wallace | 15,678 | 4.07% |
| Write-in | | 445 | 0.12% |
| Total votes | | 385,000 | 100% |

=== By county ===
| County | Hubert Humphrey Democratic | | Richard Nixon Republican | | Various candidates Other parties | | Margin | | Total votes cast |
| County | # | % | # | % | # | % | # | % | Total votes cast |
|---|---|---|---|---|---|---|---|---|---|
| Bristol | 11,561 | 59.36% | 7,403 | 38.01% | 511 | 2.63% | 4,158 | 21.35% | 19,475 |
| Kent | 35,609 | 58.69% | 22,493 | 37.07% | 2,576 | 4.24% | 13,116 | 21.62% | 60,678 |
| Newport | 16,251 | 58.39% | 10,504 | 37.74% | 1,075 | 3.87% | 5,747 | 20.65% | 27,830 |
| Providence | 169,246 | 67.64% | 70,320 | 28.11% | 10,633 | 4.25% | 98,926 | 39.53% | 250,199 |
| Washington | 13,851 | 51.65% | 11,639 | 43.40% | 1,328 | 4.95% | 2,212 | 8.25% | 26,818 |
| Totals | 246,518 | 64.03% | 122,359 | 31.78% | 16,123 | 4.19% | 124,159 | 32.25% | 385,000 |

=== By municipality ===
| Municipality | Hubert Humphrey Democratic | | Richard Nixon Republican | | Fred Halstead Socialist Workers | | George Wallace American Independent | | Margin | | Total votes cast |
| Municipality | # | % | # | % | # | % | # | % | # | % | Total votes cast |
|---|---|---|---|---|---|---|---|---|---|---|---|
| Barrington | 3,539 | 45.40% | 4,077 | 52.30% | 3 | 0.04% | 176 | 2.26% | -538 | -6.90% | 7,795 |
| Bristol | 5,005 | 70.54% | 1,896 | 26.72% | 7 | 0.10% | 187 | 2.64% | 3,109 | 43.82% | 7,095 |
| Burrillville | 2,763 | 65.37% | 1,337 | 31.63% | 2 | 0.05% | 125 | 2.96% | 1,426 | 33.74% | 4,227 |
| Central Falls | 5,977 | 74.03% | 1,794 | 22.22% | 10 | 0.12% | 293 | 3.63% | 4,183 | 51.81% | 8,074 |
| Charlestown | 462 | 37.56% | 663 | 53.90% | 0 | 0.00% | 105 | 8.54% | -201 | -16.34% | 1,230 |
| Coventry | 5,264 | 58.37% | 3,242 | 35.95% | 3 | 0.03% | 509 | 5.64% | 2,022 | 22.42% | 9,018 |
| Cranston | 21,088 | 61.30% | 11,920 | 34.65% | 30 | 0.09% | 1,366 | 3.97% | 9,168 | 26.65% | 34,404 |
| Cumberland | 6,998 | 64.06% | 3,515 | 32.18% | 12 | 0.11% | 399 | 3.65% | 3,483 | 31.88% | 10,924 |
| East Greenwich | 1,618 | 43.93% | 1,938 | 52.62% | 2 | 0.05% | 125 | 3.39% | -320 | -8.69% | 3,683 |
| East Providence | 13,154 | 63.57% | 6,802 | 32.87% | 16 | 0.08% | 720 | 3.48% | 6,352 | 30.70% | 20,692 |
| Exeter | 380 | 44.24% | 411 | 47.85% | 1 | 0.12% | 67 | 7.80% | -31 | -3.61% | 859 |
| Foster | 511 | 43.27% | 593 | 50.21% | 4 | 0.34% | 73 | 6.18% | -82 | -6.94% | 1,181 |
| Glocester | 988 | 48.48% | 940 | 46.12% | 1 | 0.05% | 109 | 5.35% | 48 | 2.36% | 2,038 |
| Hopkinton | 920 | 45.79% | 953 | 47.44% | 2 | 0.10% | 134 | 6.67% | -33 | -1.64% | 2,009 |
| Jamestown | 804 | 52.79% | 618 | 40.58% | 5 | 0.33% | 96 | 6.30% | 186 | 12.21% | 1,523 |
| Johnston | 6,339 | 68.59% | 2,362 | 25.56% | 15 | 0.16% | 526 | 5.69% | 3,977 | 43.03% | 9,242 |
| Lincoln | 4,411 | 56.73% | 3,064 | 39.41% | 8 | 0.10% | 292 | 3.76% | 1,347 | 17.32% | 7,775 |
| Little Compton | 379 | 34.33% | 680 | 61.59% | 4 | 0.36% | 41 | 3.71% | -301 | -27.26% | 1,104 |
| Middletown | 2,635 | 53.22% | 2,117 | 42.76% | 2 | 0.04% | 197 | 3.98% | 518 | 10.46% | 4,951 |
| Narragansett | 1,606 | 55.73% | 1,137 | 39.45% | 5 | 0.17% | 134 | 4.65% | 469 | 16.27% | 2,882 |
| Newport | 7,153 | 63.90% | 3,617 | 32.31% | 12 | 0.11% | 412 | 3.68% | 3,536 | 31.59% | 11,194 |
| New Shoreham | 208 | 40.00% | 294 | 56.54% | 0 | 0.00% | 18 | 3.46% | -86 | -16.54% | 520 |
| North Kingstown | 2,442 | 44.33% | 2,793 | 50.70% | 2 | 0.04% | 272 | 4.94% | -351 | -6.37% | 5,509 |
| North Providence | 7,886 | 67.48% | 3,283 | 28.09% | 6 | 0.05% | 511 | 4.37% | 4,603 | 39.39% | 11,686 |
| North Smithfield | 2,647 | 60.70% | 1,532 | 35.13% | 6 | 0.14% | 176 | 4.04% | 1,115 | 25.57% | 4,361 |
| Pawtucket | 22,790 | 69.27% | 8,835 | 26.85% | 28 | 0.09% | 1,246 | 3.79% | 13,955 | 42.42% | 32,899 |
| Portsmouth | 2,259 | 55.25% | 1,680 | 41.09% | 3 | 0.07% | 147 | 3.60% | 579 | 14.16% | 4,089 |
| Providence | 53,850 | 73.04% | 16,342 | 22.17% | 92 | 0.12% | 3,444 | 4.67% | 37,508 | 50.87% | 73,728 |
| Richmond | 534 | 51.05% | 437 | 41.78% | 0 | 0.00% | 75 | 7.17% | 97 | 9.27% | 1,046 |
| Scituate | 1,372 | 41.38% | 1,747 | 52.68% | 2 | 0.06% | 195 | 5.88% | -375 | -11.31% | 3,316 |
| Smithfield | 3,512 | 59.33% | 2,119 | 35.80% | 5 | 0.08% | 283 | 4.78% | 1,393 | 23.53% | 5,919 |
| South Kingstown | 2,730 | 52.65% | 2,215 | 42.72% | 21 | 0.41% | 219 | 4.22% | 515 | 9.93% | 5,185 |
| Tiverton | 3,021 | 60.85% | 1,792 | 36.09% | 2 | 0.04% | 150 | 3.02% | 1,229 | 24.75% | 4,965 |
| Warren | 3,017 | 65.96% | 1,430 | 31.26% | 7 | 0.15% | 120 | 2.62% | 1,587 | 34.70% | 4,574 |
| Warwick | 21,825 | 58.16% | 14,230 | 37.92% | 25 | 0.07% | 1,449 | 3.86% | 7,595 | 20.24% | 37,529 |
| Westerly | 4,569 | 60.36% | 2,736 | 36.15% | 2 | 0.03% | 262 | 3.46% | 1,833 | 24.22% | 7,569 |
| West Greenwich | 347 | 47.15% | 322 | 43.75% | 3 | 0.41% | 64 | 8.70% | 25 | 3.40% | 736 |
| West Warwick | 6,555 | 67.58% | 2,761 | 28.46% | 12 | 0.12% | 372 | 3.84% | 3,794 | 39.11% | 9,700 |
| Woonsocket | 14,960 | 75.91% | 4,135 | 20.98% | 23 | 0.12% | 589 | 2.99% | 10,825 | 54.93% | 19,707 |
| Totals | 246,518 | 64.04% | 122,359 | 31.79% | 383 | 0.10% | 15,678 | 4.07% | 124,159 | 32.25% | 384,938 |

== See also ==
- United States presidential elections in Rhode Island
