= 2016 United States presidential election in Rhode Island =

- November 8, 2016
- Turnout: 60.2% ▼0.6 pp

Nominee	Hillary Clinton	Donald Trump
Party	Democratic	Republican
Home state	New York	New York
Running mate	Tim Kaine	Mike Pence
Electoral vote	4	0
Popular vote	252,525	180,543
Percentage	54.41%	38.90%

Clinton
40–50%
50–60%
60–70%
80–90%
Trump
40–50%
50–60%
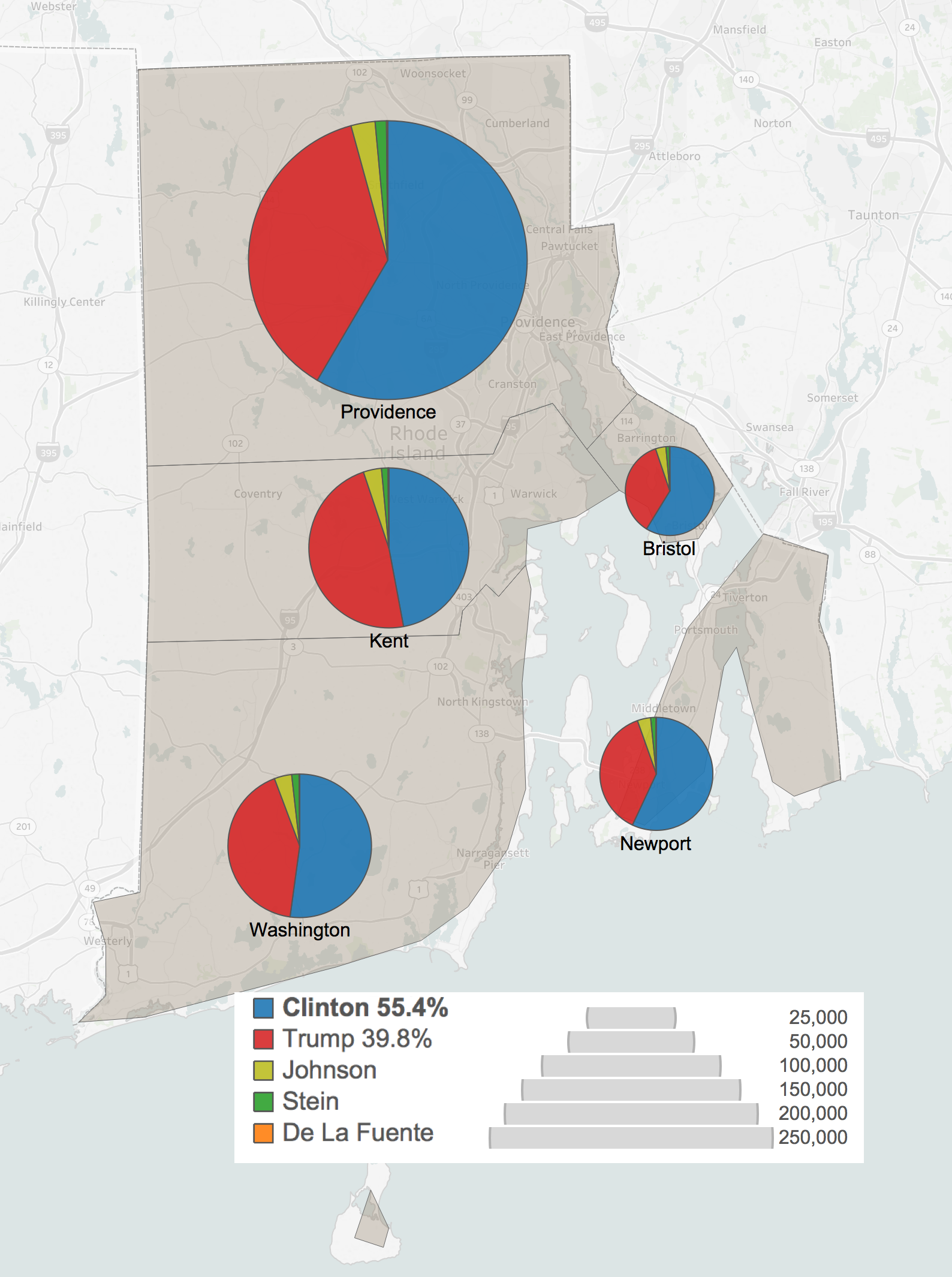
President before election
Barack Obama
Democratic
Elected President
Donald Trump
Republican

Treemap of the popular vote by county.

The 2016 United States presidential election in Rhode Island took place on November 8, 2016, as part of the 2016 United States presidential election in which all 50 states plus the District of Columbia participated. Rhode Island voters chose four electors to represent them in the Electoral College via a popular vote.

Prior to the election, Rhode Island was considered to be a state Clinton would win or a safe blue state. Rhode Island, like most of New England, is strongly Democratic. Its voters tend to be liberal on social issues, most of its population lives in urban cities, its voting age population skews younger, and the Democratic Party has been regarded as the state's dominant party since the 1930s.

Although Clinton easily won Rhode Island, her 15.5% margin was significantly weaker than Obama's 27% margin 4 years earlier. Trump notably became the first Republican nominee for president to win a county since Reagan won the state in 1984.

== Primaries ==
=== Democratic primary ===
Four candidates appeared on the Democratic presidential primary ballot:

- Bernie Sanders
- Hillary Clinton
- Rocky De La Fuente
- Mark Stewart

Rhode Island Democratic primary, April 26, 2016
Candidate	Popular vote		Estimated delegates		
Candidate	Count	Percentage	Pledged	Unpledged	Total
Bernie Sanders	66,993	54.71%	13	0	13
Hillary Clinton	52,749	43.08%	11	9	20
Mark Stewart	236	0.19%	0	0	0
Rocky De La Fuente	145	0.12%	0	0	0
Write-in	673	0.55%	0	0	0
Uncommitted	1,662	1.36%	0	0	0
Total	122,458	100%	24	9	33

=== Republican primary ===
Republican primary results by county (left) and municipality (right).
Donald Trump
- 50–60%
- 60–70%
- 70–80%
John Kasich
- 40–50%

Three candidates appeared on the Republican presidential primary ballot:

- Ted Cruz
- John Kasich
- Donald Trump

Rhode Island Republican primary, April 26, 2016
Candidate	Votes	Percentage	Actual delegate count		
Candidate	Votes	Percentage	Bound	Unbound	Total
Donald Trump	39,221	63.7%	12	0	12
John Kasich	14,963	24.3%	5	0	5
Ted Cruz	6,416	10.4%	2	0	2
Uncommitted	417	0.7%	0	0	0
Marco Rubio (withdrawn)	382	0.6%	0	0	0
Write-in	215	0.3%	0	0	0
Unprojected delegates:			0	0	0
Total:	61,614	100.00%	19	0	19
Source: Rhode Island Board of Elections

== General election ==
=== Predictions ===
Source	Ranking	As of
Los Angeles Times	Safe D	November 6, 2016
CNN	Safe D	November 4, 2016
Cook Political Report	Safe D	November 7, 2016
Electoral-vote.com	Safe D	November 8, 2016
Rothenberg Political Report	Safe D	November 7, 2016
Sabato's Crystal Ball	Safe D	November 7, 2016
RealClearPolitics	Likely D	November 8, 2016
Fox News	Safe D	November 7, 2016

=== Results ===
2016 United States presidential election in Rhode Island
Party	Candidate	Votes	%
Democratic	Hillary Clinton	252,525	54.41%
Republican	Donald Trump	180,543	38.90%
Libertarian	Gary Johnson	14,746	3.18%
Green	Jill Stein	6,220	1.34%
Write-in	Evan McMullin	759	0.16%
American Delta	Rocky De La Fuente	671	0.14%
Write-in	Mike Maturen	46	0.01%
Write-in	Darrell Castle	30	0.01%
Write-in	Other write-ins	8,604	1.85%
Total votes		464,144	100.00%

==== By county ====
County	Hillary Clinton Democratic		Donald Trump Republican		Various candidates Other parties		Margin		Total votes cast
County	#	%	#	%	#	%	#	%	Total votes cast
Bristol	14,609	57.35%	8,965	35.19%	1,901	7.46%	5,644	22.16%	25,475
Kent	37,788	46.05%	38,336	46.72%	5,929	7.23%	-548	-0.67%	82,053
Newport	22,851	55.67%	15,077	36.73%	3,117	7.60%	7,774	18.94%	41,045
Providence	142,899	57.51%	90,882	36.58%	14,693	5.91%	52,017	20.93%	248,474
Washington	33,741	50.84%	27,230	41.03%	5,398	8.13%	6,511	9.81%	66,369
Totals	252,525	54.41%	180,543	38.90%	31,076	6.69%	71,982	15.51%	464,144

Counties that flipped from Democratic to Republican

- Kent (largest city: Warwick)

==== By congressional district ====
Clinton won both congressional districts.

District	Clinton	Trump	Representative
1st	59%	34%	David Cicilline
2nd	50%	43%	James Langevin

==== By municipality ====
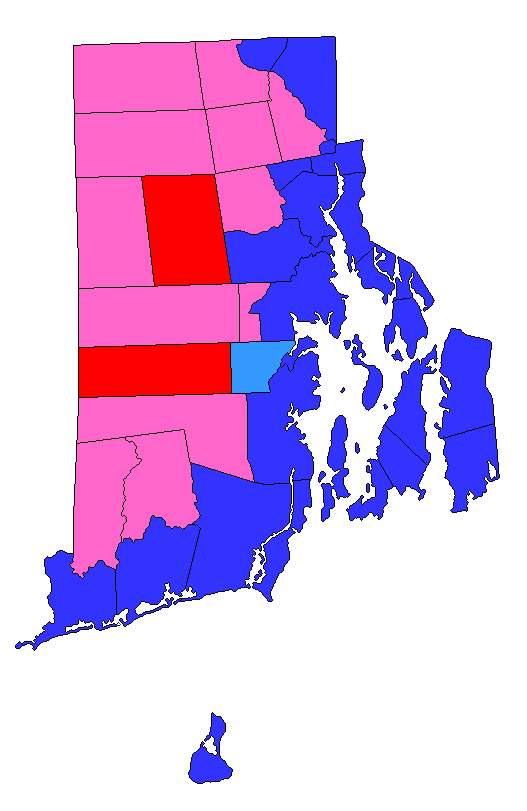
The pink municipalities voted for Barack Obama in 2012 and flipped to Donald Trump in 2016. Only East Greenwich voted for Mitt Romney in 2012 but flipped to Hillary Clinton in 2016. Dark blue and dark red municipalities did not flip from 2012 to 2016.

== Analysis ==
Donald Trump flipped several municipalities that had not voted for a Republican presidential candidate since the 1980s including Burrillville, Coventry, Exeter, Foster, Glocester, Hopkinton, Johnston, Lincoln, North Smithfield, Richmond, Smithfield, and West Warwick. Meanwhile, Hillary Clinton was able to flip East Greenwich which voted for Mitt Romney in 2012. This was the worst Democratic performance in Burrillville since 1920 and the worst Democratic performance in Johnston since 1924.

As of the 2024 presidential election, this is the solitary election since 1984 where any county in Rhode Island voted Republican (Kent County narrowly voted for Trump), and the most recent election where Lincoln voted Republican.

== See also ==
- United States presidential elections in Rhode Island
- 2016 Democratic Party presidential debates and forums
- 2016 Democratic Party presidential primaries
- 2016 Republican Party presidential debates and forums
- 2016 Republican Party presidential primaries
