= 1892 United States presidential election in Rhode Island =

- November 8, 1892
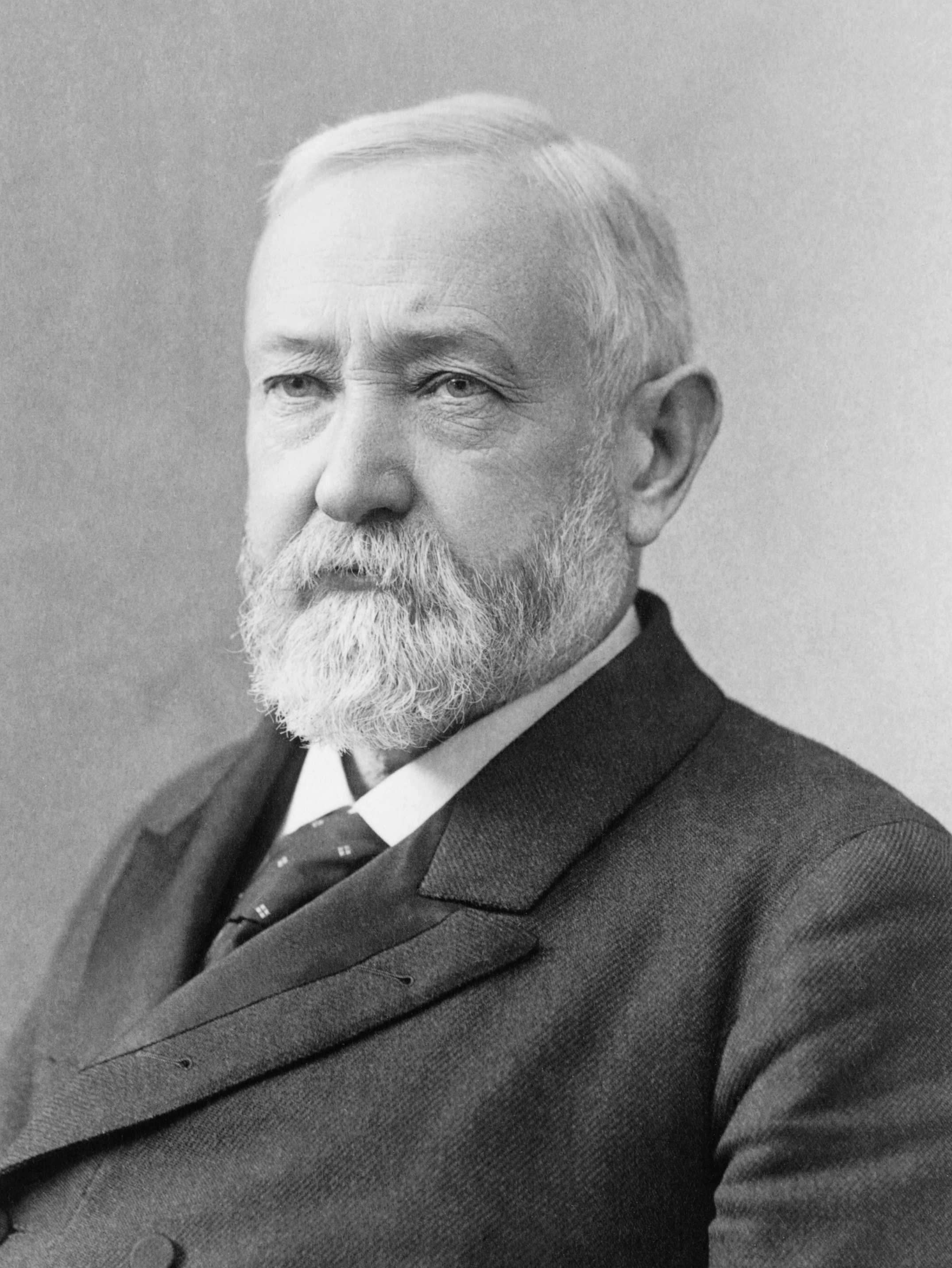

Nominee	Benjamin Harrison	Grover Cleveland
Party	Republican	Democratic
Home state	Indiana	New York
Running mate	Whitelaw Reid	Adlai Stevenson I
Electoral vote	4	0
Popular vote	26,975	24,336
Percentage	50.71%	45.75%

Harrison
40–50%
50–60%
60–70%
70–80%
80–90%
Cleveland
40–50%
50–60%
President before election
Benjamin Harrison
Republican
Elected President
Grover Cleveland
Democratic

The 1892 United States presidential election in Rhode Island took place on November 8, 1892, as part of the 1892 United States presidential election. Voters chose four representatives, or electors to the Electoral College, who voted for president and vice president.

Rhode Island voted for the Republican nominee, incumbent President Benjamin Harrison, over the Democratic nominee, former President Grover Cleveland, who was running for a second, non-consecutive term. Harrison won the state by a narrow margin of 4.96%.

This was easily the closest a Democrat came to winning Rhode Island during the Republican party's 14 election win streak beginning in 1856 shortly after the formation of the party and lasting until Woodrow Wilson's 1912 win against split opposition. Indeed, it is the only time the margin was even in the single digits.

== Results ==
1892 United States presidential election in Rhode Island
Party	Candidate	Running mate	Popular vote		Electoral vote	
Party	Candidate	Running mate	Count	%	Count	%
Republican	Benjamin Harrison of Indiana (incumbent)	Whitelaw Reid of New York	26,975	50.71%	4	100.00%
Democratic	Grover Cleveland of New York	Adlai Ewing Stevenson I of Illinois	24,336	45.75%	0	0.00%
Prohibition	John Bidwell of California	James Britton Cranfill of Texas	1,654	3.11%	0	0.00%
Populist	James Baird Weaver of Iowa	James Gaven Field of Virginia	228	0.43%	0	0.00%
N/A	Others	Others	3	0.01%	0	0.00%
Total			53,196	100.00%	4	100.00%

== See also ==
- United States presidential elections in Rhode Island
