= 1904 United States presidential election in Rhode Island =

- November 8, 1904
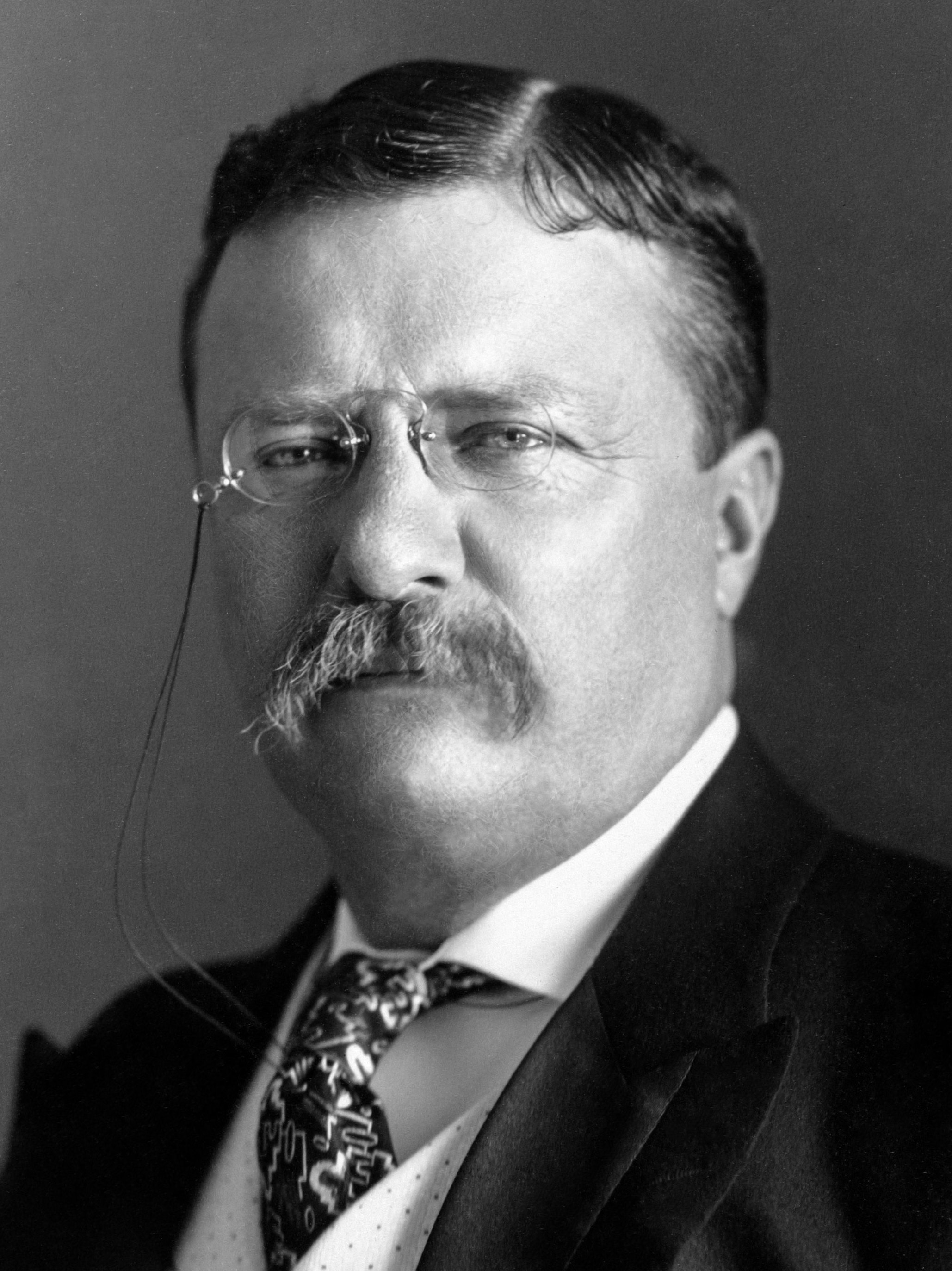

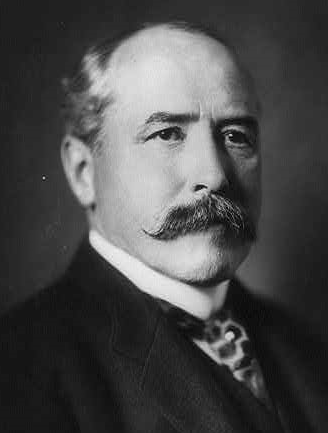
Nominee	Theodore Roosevelt	Alton B. Parker
Party	Republican	Democratic
Home state	New York	New York
Running mate	Charles W. Fairbanks	Henry G. Davis
Electoral vote	4	0
Popular vote	41,605	24,839
Percentage	60.60%	36.18%

Roosevelt
50–60%
60–70%
70–80%
80–90%
90–100%
Parker
50–60%
President before election
Theodore Roosevelt
Republican
Elected President
Theodore Roosevelt
Republican

The 1904 United States presidential election in Rhode Island took place on November 8, 1904, as part of the 1904 United States presidential election. Voters chose four representatives, or electors to the Electoral College, who voted for president and vice president.

Rhode Island overwhelmingly voted for the Republican nominee, President Theodore Roosevelt, over the Democratic nominee, former Chief Judge of New York Court of Appeals Alton B. Parker. Roosevelt won Rhode Island by a margin of 24.42%.

== Results ==
1904 United States presidential election in Rhode Island
Party	Candidate	Running mate	Popular vote		Electoral vote	
Party	Candidate	Running mate	Count	%	Count	%
Republican	Theodore Roosevelt of New York (incumbent)	Charles Warren Fairbanks of Indiana	41,605	60.60%	4	100.00%
Democratic	Alton Brooks Parker of New York	Henry Gassaway Davis of West Virginia	24,839	36.18%	0	0.00%
Socialist	Eugene Victor Debs of Indiana	Benjamin Hanford of New York	956	1.39%	0	0.00%
Prohibition	Silas Comfort Swallow of Pennsylvania	George Washington Carroll of Texas	768	1.12%	0	0.00%
Socialist Labor	Charles Hunter Corregan of New York	William Wesley Cox of Illinois	488	0.71%	0	0.00%
Total			68,656	100.00%	4	100.00%

== See also ==
- United States presidential elections in Rhode Island
