= 1984 United States presidential election in Rhode Island =

- November 6, 1984
- Turnout: 78.0% ▼1.0 pp

Nominee	Ronald Reagan	Walter Mondale
Party	Republican	Democratic
Home state	California	Minnesota
Running mate	George H. W. Bush	Geraldine Ferraro
Electoral vote	4	0
Popular vote	212,080	197,106
Percentage	51.66%	48.02%

Reagan
50–60%
60–70%
Mondale
50–60%
60–70%
President before election
Ronald Reagan
Republican
Elected President
Ronald Reagan
Republican

The 1984 United States presidential election in Rhode Island took place on November 6, 1984. All 50 states and the District of Columbia, were part of the 1984 United States presidential election. Voters chose four electors to the Electoral College, which selected the president and vice president of the United States.

Rhode Island was won by incumbent United States President Ronald Reagan of California, who was running against former Vice President Walter Mondale of Minnesota. Reagan ran for a second time with incumbent Vice President and former C.I.A. Director George H. W. Bush of Texas, and Mondale ran with Representative Geraldine Ferraro of New York, the first major female candidate for the vice presidency. Rhode Island is 1 of 6 States that voted for Reagan in 1984 and have not voted Republican in any presidential race since; the other 5 are Washington, Hawaii, Massachusetts, New York, and Oregon. This was also the last time that the counties of Bristol, Newport and Washington voted for a Republican presidential candidate and the last time a Republican presidential candidate won Kent County or any county in the state until Donald Trump won it in 2016.

To date, this is the last time that the cities of Cranston, Newport, and Warwick, as well as the towns of Bristol, Cumberland, Jamestown, Narragansett, New Shoreham, South Kingstown, Warren, and Westerly voted Republican. The city of Woonsocket would not vote Republican again until 2024. This is the last time Republicans won any congressional district in the state.

== Results ==
1984 United States presidential election in Rhode Island
Party	Candidate	Votes	Percentage	Electoral votes
Republican	Ronald Reagan (incumbent)	212,080	51.66%	4
Democratic	Walter Mondale	197,106	48.02%	0
America First	Bob Richards	510	0.12%	0
Libertarian	David Bergland	277	0.07%	0
Citizen's Party	Sonia Johnson	240	0.06%	0
Workers World	Larry Holmes	91	0.02%	0
Communist Party	Gus Hall	75	0.02%	0
Socialist Workers Party	Melvin Mason	61	0.01%	0
New Alliance Party	Dennis Serrette	49	0.01%	0
Write-Ins		3	>0.01%	0
Totals		410,492	100.0%	4

=== By county ===
County	Ronald Reagan Republican		Walter Mondale Democratic		Various candidates Other parties		Margin		Total votes cast
County	#	%	#	%	#	%	#	%	Total votes cast
Bristol	11,635	55.18%	9,386	44.52%	63	0.30%	2,249	10.66%	21,084
Kent	40,427	56.15%	31,352	43.55%	214	0.30%	9,075	12.60%	71,993
Newport	19,629	57.38%	14,466	42.29%	114	0.33%	5,163	15.09%	34,209
Providence	116,024	48.16%	124,109	51.52%	765	0.32%	-8,085	-3.36%	240,898
Washington	24,365	57.59%	17,793	42.06%	147	0.35%	6,572	15.53%	42,305
Totals	212,080	51.66%	197,106	48.02%	1,306	0.32%	14,974	3.64%	410,492

==== Counties flipped from Democratic to Republican ====
- Bristol
- Kent

== See also ==
- United States presidential elections in Rhode Island
- Presidency of Ronald Reagan
