= National Register of Historic Places listings in Burrillville, Rhode Island =

This is a list of Registered Historic Places in Burrillville, Rhode Island.

Contents: Counties in Rhode Island

Bristol | Kent | Newport | Providence (Pawtucket | Providence (city) | Woonsocket) | Washington

This National Park Service list is complete through NPS recent listings posted April 17, 2026.

	Name on the Register	Image	Date listed	Location	City or town	Description
1	Bridgeton School	Bridgeton School	December 27, 2006 (#06001191)	16 Laurel Hill Ave. 41°57′52″N 71°42′47″W	Burrillville	
2	Esten-Bowen House	Esten-Bowen House	December 30, 2011 (#11000978)	299 Iron Mine Rd. 42°00′17″N 71°38′17″W	Burrillville	
3	Harrisville Historic District	Harrisville Historic District	March 21, 1984 (#84002010)	Roughly bounded by Wood and Sherman Rds., East Ave, and Main, Chapel, School, and River Sts. 41°57′59″N 71°40′33″W	Burrillville	
4	Oakland Historic District	Oakland Historic District	September 9, 1987 (#87001359)	Victory Highway; 41°57′32″N 71°38′47″W	Burrillville	
5	Pascoag Grammar School	Pascoag Grammar School	November 21, 2006 (#06001062)	265 Sayles Ave. 41°57′46″N 71°42′18″W	Burrillville	
6	Moses Taft House	Moses Taft House	March 20, 2009 (#08000718)	111 East Wallum Lake Road; 41°57′59″N 71°43′02″W	Burrillville	

== See also ==
- National Register of Historic Places listings in Providence County, Rhode Island
- List of National Historic Landmarks in Rhode Island
