= Providence and Springfield Railroad =

Railroad in Rhode Island and Massachusetts

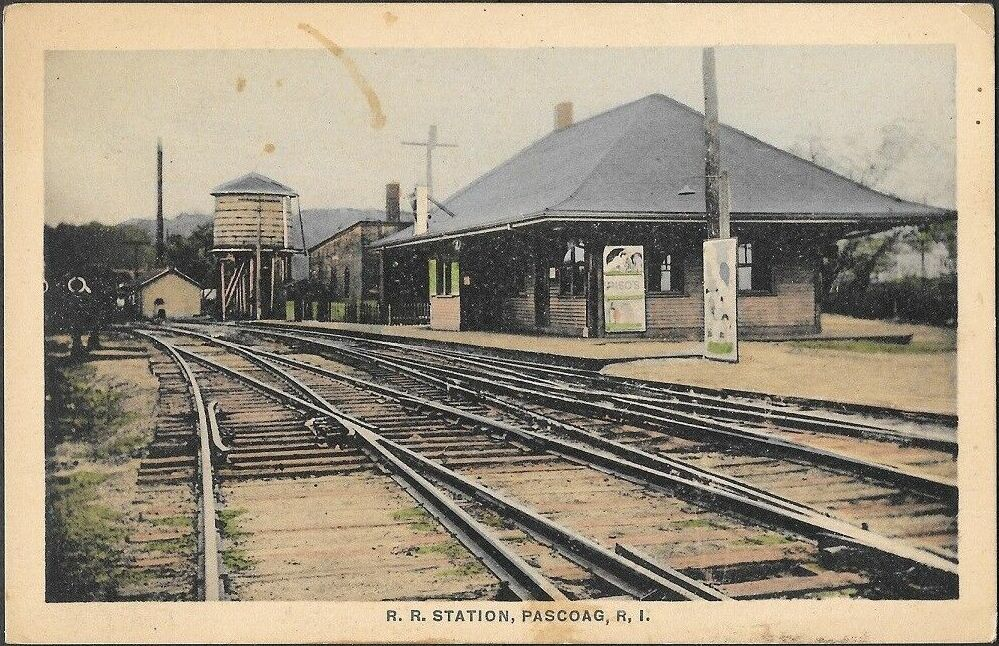
- Postcard view of Pascoag station

Overview
- Headquarters: Providence, Rhode Island
- Dates of operation: 1873–1890 (as independent company)
- Successor: New York and New England Railroad (1890–1899); New York, New Haven and Hartford Railroad (1899–1965)

Technical
- Track gauge: 4 ft 8 1/2 in (1,435 mm) standard gauge
- Length: 29.4 miles (47.3 km)

The Providence and Springfield Railroad was a railroad in the U.S. states of Rhode Island and Massachusetts. It was originally chartered as the Woonasquatucket Railroad in 1857, and renamed to the Providence and Springfield Railroad in 1872. Construction started in 1872, and the line opened between the Olneyville neighborhood of Providence and Pascoag, Rhode Island, in 1873.

The Providence and Springfield was leased by the New York and New England Railroad in 1890. The NY&NE extended the line northward to Douglas, Massachusetts, in 1893. The New York, New Haven and Hartford Railroad took control of the NY&NE in 1895. The extension north of Pascoag was abandoned in 1937, and the remainder of the line in 1962. Parts of the right of way have been converted into rail-trails.

== History ==
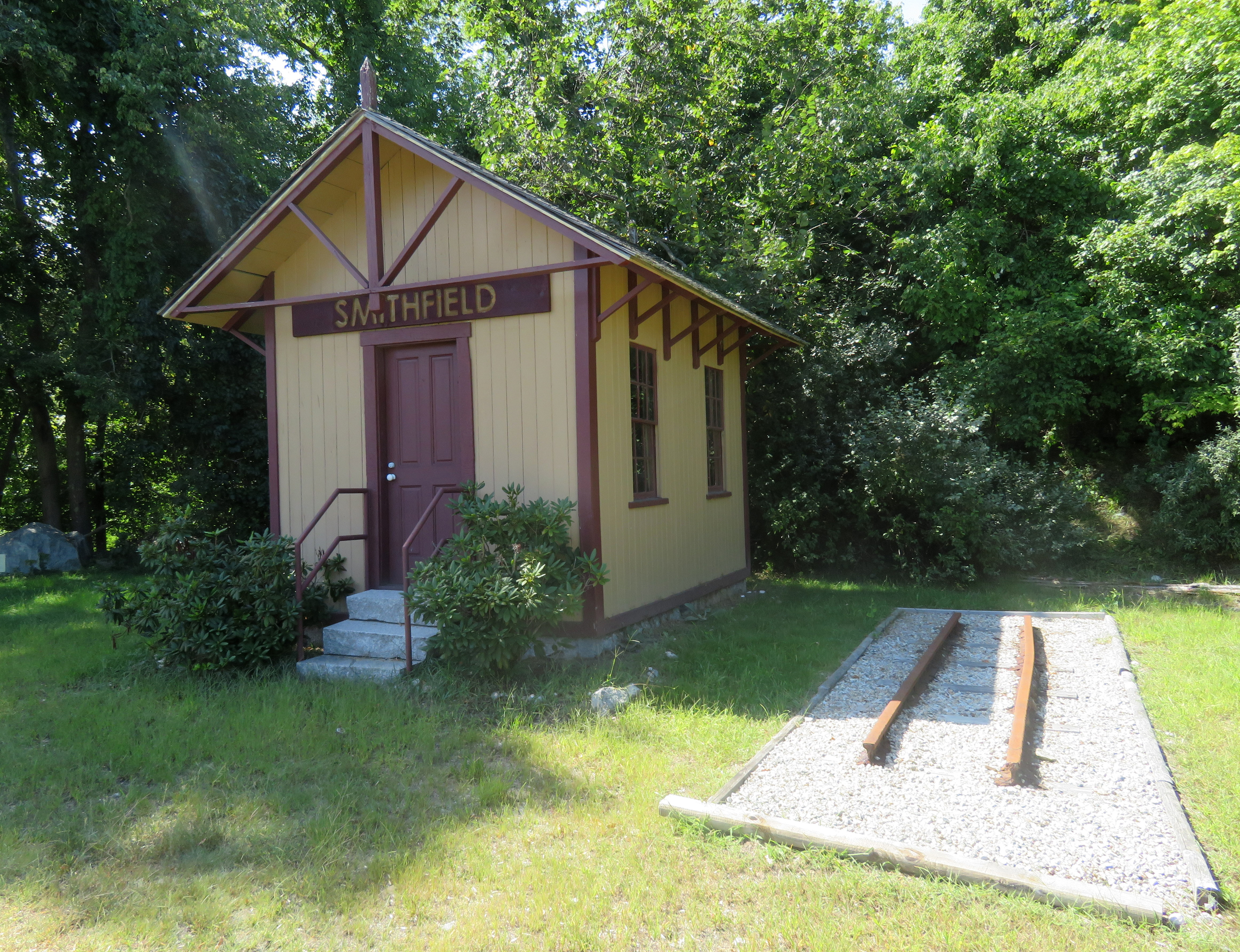
Smithfield station in 2018

The Woonasquatucket Railroad was chartered in January 1857. The railroad was intended to link Providence to Springfield, Massachusetts, meeting the Boston and Albany Railroad. No progress was made at first, as the Panic of 1857 and the Civil War precluded any investment in the new company. While the charter was renewed several times, the railroad was not organized until 1871. The railroad's organizers were primarily owners of mills on the Woonasquatucket River in the vicinity of Providence. The company's name was changed to the Providence and Springfield Railroad in January 1872 by an act of the Rhode Island General Assembly. The new name reflected the company's ultimate goal of expanding to reach mills in rural northwestern Rhode Island and create a link towards Springfield. A second act passed contemporaneously authorized the City of Providence to purchase up to $500,000 worth of bonds to support the railroad's construction, and other towns to subscribe to the railroad's stock.

Construction began in the spring of 1872. Grading was completed on 4 miles (6.4 km) of the line by mid-June and 15 miles (24 km) by mid-October. Laying of rails began in the spring of 1873. Locomotives for the line were built by the Rhode Island Locomotive Works of Providence. The railroad opened between Providence's Olneyville neighborhood and Pascoag, Rhode Island, on August 11, 1873. Facilities including an engine house and car house were located at Pascoag. By December 1873, the railroad had cost $920,087 to build and equip. It had two locomotives, three passenger cars, a baggage/smoking car, and 65 freight and other cars.

At first, trains covered the remaining distance between Olneyville and Providence Union Station via trackage rights over the Hartford, Providence and Fishkill Railroad (HP&F) main line. By agreement with the HP&F and the city, the Providence and Springfield then built its own track within the HP&F right-of-way. Construction of the new track began on September 12, 1873; it was completed in 1874.

The company built its own station in Providence in 1880 at Gaspee Street, near the Great Salt Cove. The Providence and Springfield was leased by the New York and New England Railroad in 1890. The NY&NE expanded the Providence and Springfield northward from Pascoag to Douglas, Massachusetts, connecting to the NY&NE main line there.

The NY&NE was succeeded by the short-lived New England Railroad in 1895, under the control of the New York, New Haven and Hartford Railroad (the New Haven), which took direct control in 1898. The New England Railroad shut down the line north of Pascoag within a year of assuming operations; it was returned to service in 1904. Trains north of Pascoag were ended again in 1926, and the NY&NE-built extension abandoned in 1937. The original Providence and Springfield Railroad main line continued to see local freight service until abandonment in 1962, and the two miles (3.2 km) originally built in 1874 followed in 1965. Several segments of the railroad are now rail-trails, including the Woonasquatucket River Greenway. A preserved station remains in Smithfield, Rhode Island.

== Route ==
The Providence and Springfield Railroad ran largely northwest from Providence to Douglas, Massachusetts, with a length of 29.4 miles (47.3 km). All but 1.6 miles (2.6 km) were in Rhode Island. From downtown Providence, it paralleled the Hartford, Providence and Fishkill Railroad and the New York, Providence and Boston Railroad (now part of the Northeast Corridor) southwest to Dike Street, where it turned northwest to follow the Woonasquatucket River. The line turned west at Primose and met the Pascoag Extension at Harrisville, Rhode Island. At Pascoag it again turned northwest and crossed the Pascoag River and Clear River on substantial bridges. It ran along the east shore of Wallum Lake into Massachusetts and terminated at a wye with the NY&NE at Douglas Junction.

=== Stations ===
Municipality	Station	Miles (km)	Connections and notes
Providence	Providence	0.0 (0.0)	Junction with Boston and Providence Railroad (Northeast Corridor), Providence and Worcester Railroad, East Junction Branch, and Providence, Warren and Bristol Railroad
Providence	Dike Street	1.8 (2.9)	Junction with New York, Providence and Boston Railroad (Northeast Corridor) and Hartford, Providence and Fishkill Railroad (Washington Secondary)
Providence	Olneyville	2.3 (3.6)	
Johnston	Manton	4.1 (6.6)	
Johnston	Lymansville	4.7 (7.5)	
Johnston	Centreville	6.2 (10.0)	
Johnston	Greystone	6.7 (10.8)	
Smithfield	Esmond	7.7 (12.4)	
Smithfield	Georgiaville	8.5 (13.7)	
Smithfield	Stillwater	9.8 (15.7)	
Smithfield	Smithfield	12.1 (19.4)	
North Smithfield	Primrose	14.2 (22.9)	
North Smithfield	Fields Station	15.7 (25.3)	
Burrillville	Tarkiln	16.7 (26.9)	
Burrillville	Oakland	19.5 (31.4)	
Burrillville	Harrisville	20.9 (33.7)	Junction with Pascoag Extension
Burrillville	Pascoag	22.5 (36.2)	
Burrillville	Bridgeton	23.3 (37.5)	
Burrillville	Wallum Lake	27.1 (43.6)	
Douglas, MA	Clear Lake	28.6 (46.1)	
Douglas, MA	–	29.4 (47.3)	Douglas Junction – junction with New York and New England Railroad
