= Rhode Island Route 107 =

State highway in Rhode Island, US

Route 107

Route information
- Maintained by RIDOT
- Length: 3.9 mi (6.3 km)
- Existed: 1934–present

Major junctions
- West end: Route 100 in Pascoag
- East end: Route 102 in Burrillville

Location
- Country: United States
- State: Rhode Island

Highway system
- Rhode Island Routes
← Route 104	→ Route 108

Route 107 is a numbered State Highway running 3.9 miles (6.3 km) in Rhode Island, United States. The route serves the town of Burrillville and connects Route 100 with Route 102.

== Route description ==
Route 107 begins in the village of Pascoag as Pascoag Main Street heading northeast. It soon reaches the village of Harrisville, entering along Chapel Street. Route 107 intersects Route 98 in the center of the village then leaves east along East Avenue. Route 107 soon intersects Route 102 (Broncos Highway) and continues for another block to end at Victory Highway, which is an old alignment of Route 102 that is still state-maintained.

== History ==
Before 1934, Route 107 was on the opposite side of the State. Originally, Route 107 started at the junction of present-day Route 3 and Route 138 in Richmond. From there, it went east along Route 138 then south along Route 108 to end at U.S. Route 1 (US 1). At the time, modern Route 107 was unnumbered.

== Major intersections ==
The entire route is in Providence County.

Location	mi	km	Destinations	Notes
Pascoag	0.0	0.0	Route 100 (South Main Street)	Western terminus
Burrillville	1.8	2.9	Route 98 north (Harrisville Main Street) to Route 96	Southern terminus of concurrency with Route 98
Harrisville	1.9	3.1	Route 98 south (Harrisville Main Street)	Northern terminus of concurrency with Route 98
Burrillville	3.7	6.0	Route 102 (Broncos Highway)	
Burrillville	3.9	6.3	Victory Highway	Eastern terminus, former Route 102
1.000 mi = 1.609 km; 1.000 km = 0.621 mi: Concurrency terminus
