= List of highways numbered 98 =

The following highways are numbered 98:

== International ==
- E98 European route E98

== China ==
- G98 Expressway

== India ==
- National Highway 98 (India)

== Israel ==
- Highway 98 (Israel)

== Korea, South ==
- Gukjido 98

== New Zealand ==
- New Zealand State Highway 98

== Poland ==
- National road 98 (former; 1986–2000 and 2011–2019)

== United Kingdom ==
- A98

== United States ==
- Interstate 98 (proposed)
  - Interstate 98 (Michigan) (former proposal)
- U.S. Route 98
- Alabama State Route 98 (pre-1957) (former)
  - County Route 98 (Baldwin County, Alabama)
- Alaska Route 98
- Arizona State Route 98
- Arkansas Highway 98
- California State Route 98
- Georgia State Route 98
- Hawaii Route 98
- Illinois Route 98
- Iowa Highway 98
- K-98 (Kansas highway)
- Kentucky Route 98
- Louisiana Highway 98
  - Louisiana State Route 98 (former)
- Maine State Route 98
- Maryland Route 98 (former)
- Massachusetts Route 98
- M-98 (Michigan highway) (former)
- Minnesota State Highway 98 (former)
  - Trunk Highway 98 (Minnesota 1934) (former)
- Missouri Route 98
- Nebraska Highway 98
- County Route 98 (Bergen County, New Jersey)
- New York State Route 98
  - County Route 98 (Dutchess County, New York)
  - County Route 98 (Monroe County, New York)
  - County Route 98 (Montgomery County, New York)
  - County Route 98 (Onondaga County, New York)
  - County Route 98 (Orleans County, New York)
  - County Route 98 (Rockland County, New York)
    - County Route 98A (Rockland County, New York)
  - County Route 98 (Saratoga County, New York)
  - County Route 98 (Suffolk County, New York)
- North Carolina Highway 98
- Ohio State Route 98
- Oklahoma State Highway 98
  - Oklahoma State Highway 98S
- Pennsylvania Route 98
- Rhode Island Route 98
- South Carolina Highway 98 (pre-1937) (former)
- Tennessee State Route 98
- Texas State Highway 98
  - Texas State Highway Loop 98
  - Texas State Highway Spur 98 (former)
  - Farm to Market Road 98
- Utah State Route 98 (former)
- Virginia State Route 98
- West Virginia Route 98
- Wisconsin Highway 98

== See also ==
- A98
- N98
- P98
- Route 98 (MTA Maryland), a bus route in Baltimore, Maryland and its suburbs
- London Buses route 98

Preceded by 97	Lists of highways 98	Succeeded by 99
