= List of highways numbered 97 =

Route 97, or Highway 97, may refer to:

== Australia ==
– Olympic Dam Highway, South Australia

== Canada ==
- British Columbia Highway 97
  - British Columbia Highway 97A
  - British Columbia Highway 97B
  - British Columbia Highway 97C
  - British Columbia Highway 97D
  - British Columbia Highway 97E (former)
  - British Columbia Highway 97W (former)

== Greece ==
- EO97 road

== India ==
- National Highway 97 (India), now part of National Highway 24

== Korea, South ==
- Gukjido 97

== New Zealand ==
- New Zealand State Highway 97

== Poland ==
- DK 97 (National road 97)

== United States ==
- Interstate 97
- U.S. Route 97
  - U.S. Route 97 (Alaska) (former proposal)
- Alabama State Route 97
  - County Route 97 (Lee County, Alabama)
- Arizona State Route 97
- Arkansas Highway 97
- Colorado State Highway 97
- Connecticut Route 97
- Florida State Road 97
  - County Road 97 (Escambia County, Florida)
    - County Road 97A (Escambia County, Florida)
- Georgia State Route 97
- Idaho State Highway 97
- Illinois Route 97
  - Illinois Route 97A (former)
- Iowa Highway 97 (former)
- Kentucky Route 97
- Louisiana Highway 97
- Maine State Route 97
- Maryland Route 97
  - Maryland Route 97A
- Massachusetts Route 97
- M-97 (Michigan highway)
- Minnesota State Highway 97
- Missouri Route 97
- Nebraska Highway 97
- New Hampshire Route 97
- County Route 97 (Bergen County, New Jersey)
- New Mexico State Road 97
- New York State Route 97
  - County Route 97 (Dutchess County, New York)
  - County Route 97 (Jefferson County, New York)
  - County Route 97 (Rockland County, New York)
  - County Route 97 (Saratoga County, New York)
  - County Route 97 (Steuben County, New York)
  - County Route 97 (Suffolk County, New York)
- North Carolina Highway 97
- North Dakota Highway 97
- Ohio State Route 97
- Oklahoma State Highway 97
- Pennsylvania:
  - Pennsylvania Route 97 (Adams County)
  - Pennsylvania Route 97 (Erie County)
- South Carolina Highway 97
- Tennessee State Route 97
- Texas State Highway 97
  - Texas State Highway Spur 97
  - Farm to Market Road 97
- Utah State Route 97
- Virginia State Route 97
- West Virginia Route 97
- Wisconsin Highway 97

== See also ==
- A97 road
- B97
- European route E97
- F-97 (Michigan county highway)
- N97
- Route 97 (MTA Maryland), a bus route in Baltimore, Maryland
- London Buses route 97

Preceded by 96	Lists of highways 97	Succeeded by 98
