= Pascoag River =

River in Rhode Island, United States

Coordinates: 41.9606°N 71.7023°W

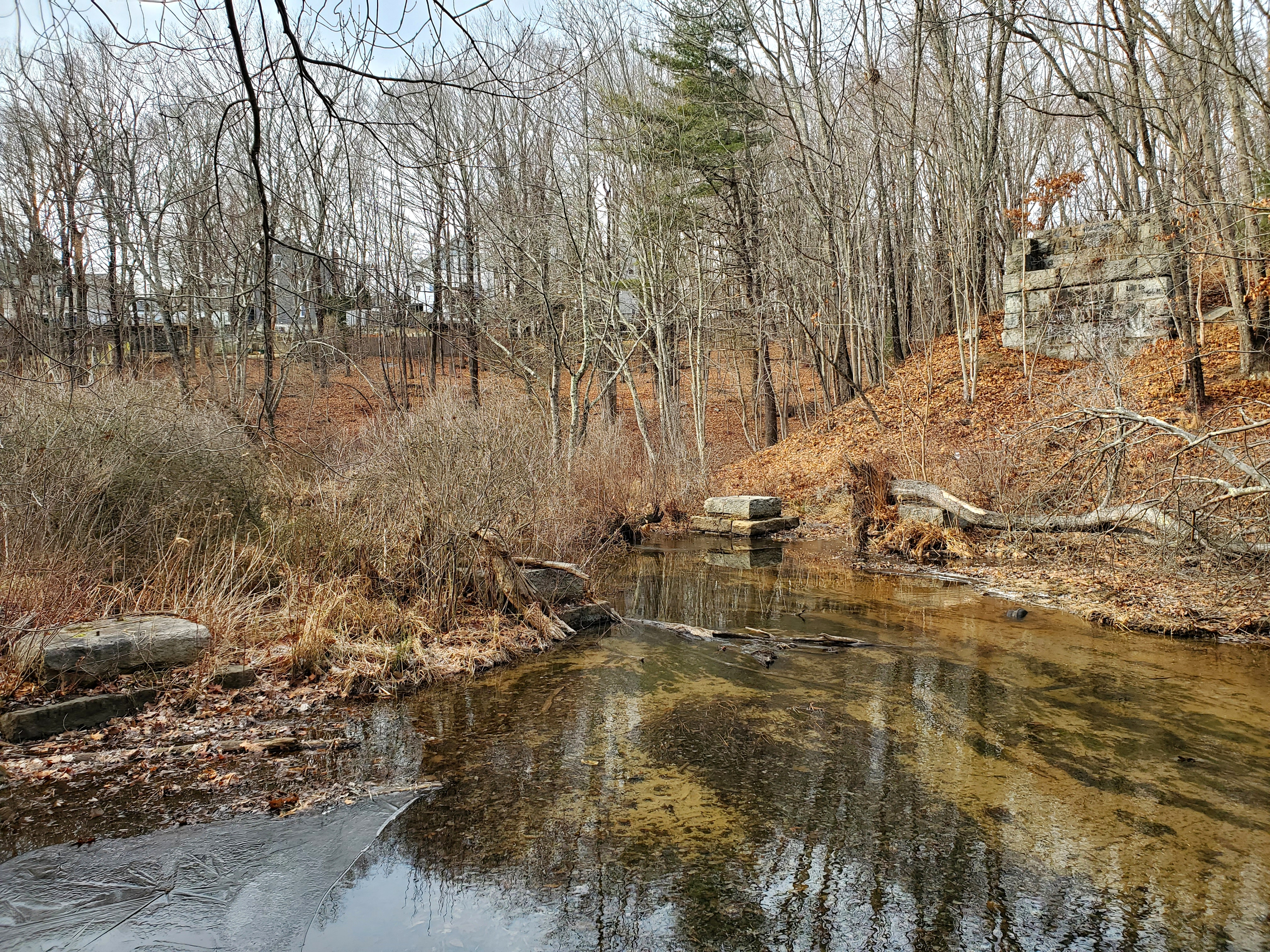
The Pascoag River in Pascoag, with remains of a Providence and Springfield Railroad trestle visible

The Pascoag River (PASS-ko or PASS-kog) is a river in the U.S. state of Rhode Island. It flows approximately 4.5 miles (7 km). There are five dams along the river's length.

== Course ==
The river rises from the various streams that feed the Pascoag Reservoir in Glocester. From the reservoir, the river flows north to Burrillville where it flows into the Clear River in the village of Pascoag.

== Crossings ==
Below is a list of all crossings over the Pascoag River. The list starts at the headwaters and goes downstream.

- Glocester
  - Jackson School House Road
- Burrillville
  - High Street (RI 100)
  - Sayles Avenue
  - Bridge Way
  - Grove Street

== Tributaries ==
The Pascoag River has no named tributaries, however there are many unnamed streams that also feed it.

== See also ==
- List of rivers in Rhode Island
- Clear River
