= List of highways numbered 96 =

The following highways are numbered 96:

== Australia ==
- Buntine Highway
- D'Aguilar Highway (Queensland State Highway) Kingaroy to Nanango section

== Canada ==
- Winnipeg Route 96
- Ontario Highway 96 (former)

== Germany ==
- Bundesstraße 96
  - Bundesstraße 96a

== Iran ==
- Road 96

== Korea, South ==
- Gukjido 96

== New Zealand ==
- New Zealand State Highway 96

== Poland ==
- National road 96 (DK96)

== United States ==
- Interstate 96
- U.S. Route 96
  - U.S. Route 96 (1926) (former)
- Alabama State Route 96
- Arizona State Route 96
- Arkansas Highway 96
- California State Route 96
- Colorado State Highway 96
- Georgia State Route 96
- Illinois Route 96
- Iowa Highway 96
- K-96 (Kansas highway)
- Kentucky Route 96
- Louisiana Highway 96
- Maine State Route 96
- Maryland Route 96 (former)
- Massachusetts Route 96
- M-96 (Michigan highway)
- Minnesota State Highway 96
  - County Road 96 (Dakota County, Minnesota)
  - County Road 96 (Ramsey County, Minnesota)
- Missouri Route 96
  - Missouri Route 96 (1922) (former proposal)
  - Missouri Route 96 (1929) (former)
- Nebraska Highway 96
- County Route 96 (Bergen County, New Jersey)
- New Mexico State Road 96
- New York State Route 96
  - New York State Route 96A
  - New York State Route 96B
  - County Route 96 (Broome County, New York)
  - County Route 96 (Cattaraugus County, New York)
  - County Route 96 (Cayuga County, New York)
  - County Route 96 (Dutchess County, New York)
  - County Route 96 (Erie County, New York)
  - County Route 96 (Herkimer County, New York)
  - County Route 96 (Jefferson County, New York)
  - County Route 96 (Madison County, New York)
  - County Route 96 (Montgomery County, New York)
  - County Route 96 (Niagara County, New York)
  - County Route 96 (Rensselaer County, New York)
  - County Route 96 (Saratoga County, New York)
  - County Route 96 (Schenectady County, New York)
  - County Route 96 (Suffolk County, New York)
- North Carolina Highway 96
- Ohio State Route 96
- Oklahoma State Highway 96
- Pennsylvania Route 96
- Rhode Island Route 96
- South Carolina Highway 96
- Tennessee State Route 96
- Texas State Highway 96
  - Texas State Highway Loop 96
  - Farm to Market Road 96
- Utah State Route 96
- Virginia State Route 96
- Washington State Route 96
- Wisconsin Highway 96
- Wyoming Highway 96

== See also ==
- A96
- B96
- M96 motorway
- N96
- P96
- London Buses route 96
- OC Transpo Route 96, a bus rapid transit route in Ottawa, Ontario
- Melbourne tram route 96

Preceded by 95	Lists of highways 96	Succeeded by 97
