= Route 96 =

Route 96 may refer to:

- Melbourne tram route 96, Australia
- OC Transpo Route 96, a bus rapid transit route in Ottawa, Ontario, Canada
- Winnipeg Route 96, Canada
- Route 96 (Iceland)
- London Buses route 96, UK

In the U.S.:

- U.S. Route 96
- U.S. Route 96 (1926)
- Alabama State Route 96
- Arizona State Route 96
- California State Route 96
- Georgia State Route 96
- Illinois Route 96
- Kentucky Route 96
- Maine State Route 96
- Maryland Route 96 (former)
- Massachusetts Route 96
- Missouri Route 96
- New York State Route 96
- Ohio State Route 96
- Pennsylvania Route 96
- Rhode Island Route 96
- Tennessee State Route 96
- Utah State Route 96
- Virginia State Route 96
- Washington State Route 96

== See also ==
- List of highways numbered 96
