= Rhode Island Route 100 =

State highway in Providence County, Rhode Island, US

Route 100

Route information
- Maintained by RIDOT
- Length: 9.3 mi (15.0 km)

Major junctions
- South end: Route 102 / US 44 in Glocester
- North end: Wallum Lake Road in Douglas, MA

Location
- Country: United States
- State: Rhode Island
- Counties: Providence

Highway system
- Rhode Island Routes
← Route 99	→ Route 101

Route 100 is a numbered state highway running 9.3 miles (15.0 km) in Rhode Island. Route 100's southern terminus is at Route 102 in Glocester and the northern terminus is a continuation as Wallum Lake Road near Douglas, Massachusetts.

== Route description ==
Route 100 takes the following route through the State:

- Chepachet (Town of Glocester): 0.8 miles (1.3 km); Route 102 and Route 44 to Burrillville town line
  - Money Hill Road
- Burrillville: 7.2 miles (11.6 km); Glocester town line to Massachusetts State line at Wallum Lake Road
  - South Main Street, Main Street, Church Street and Wallum Lake Road

Route 100 becomes an unnumbered road (Wallum Lake Road) in Massachusetts.

== Major intersections ==
The entire route is in Providence County.

Location	mi	km	Destinations	Notes
Chepachet	0.0	0.0	Route 102 (Victory Highway) / US 44	Southern terminus
Chepachet	0.8	1.3	Route 98 north (Steere Farm Road)	Southern terminus of Route 98
Pascoag	3.2	5.1	Route 107 east (Main Street)	Western terminus of Route 107
Burrillville	9.3	15.0	Wallum Lake Road north – Douglas	Continuation into Massachusetts To Route 16
1.000 mi = 1.609 km; 1.000 km = 0.621 mi
