= 1912 United States presidential election in Rhode Island =

- November 5, 1912

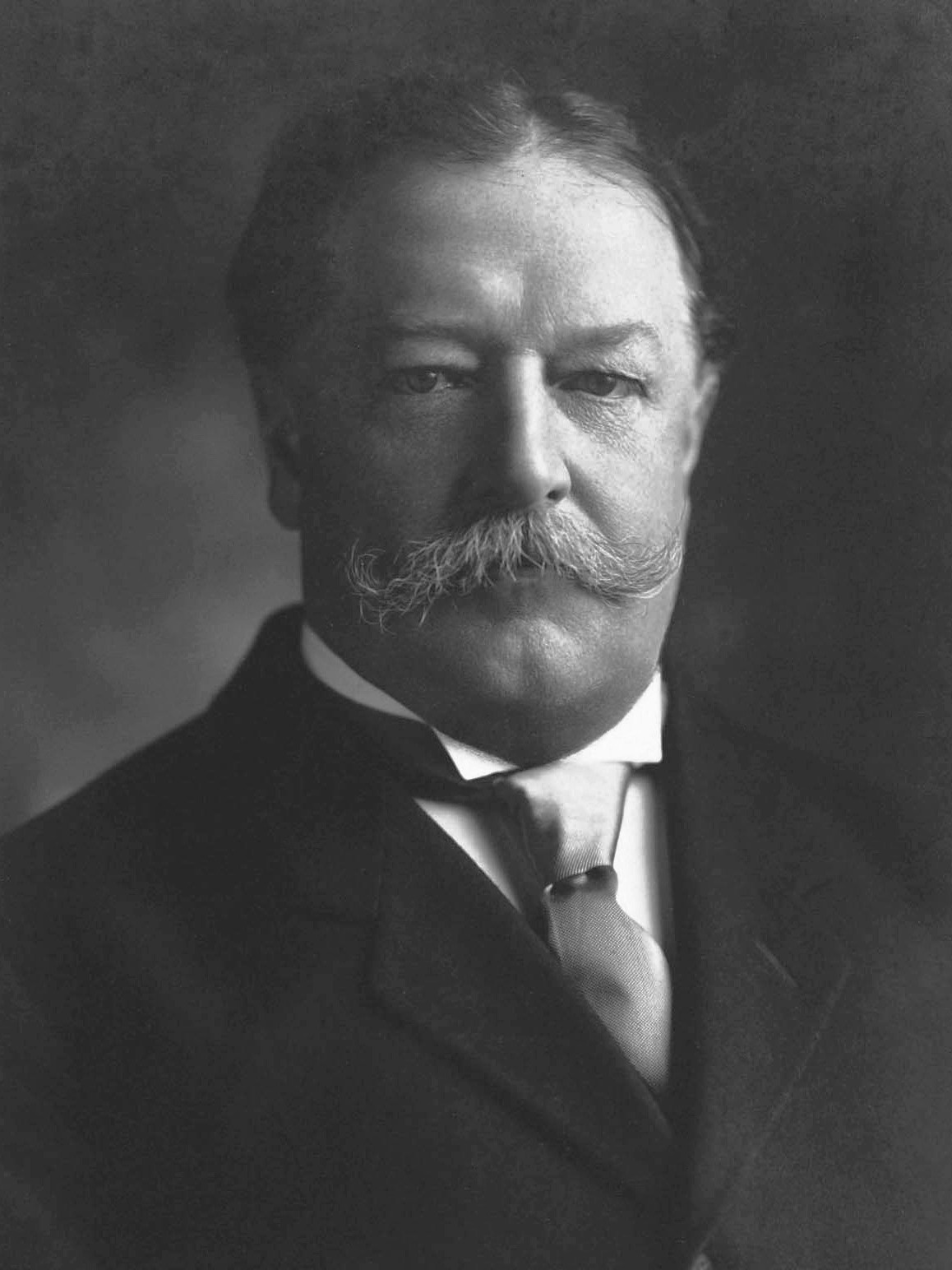

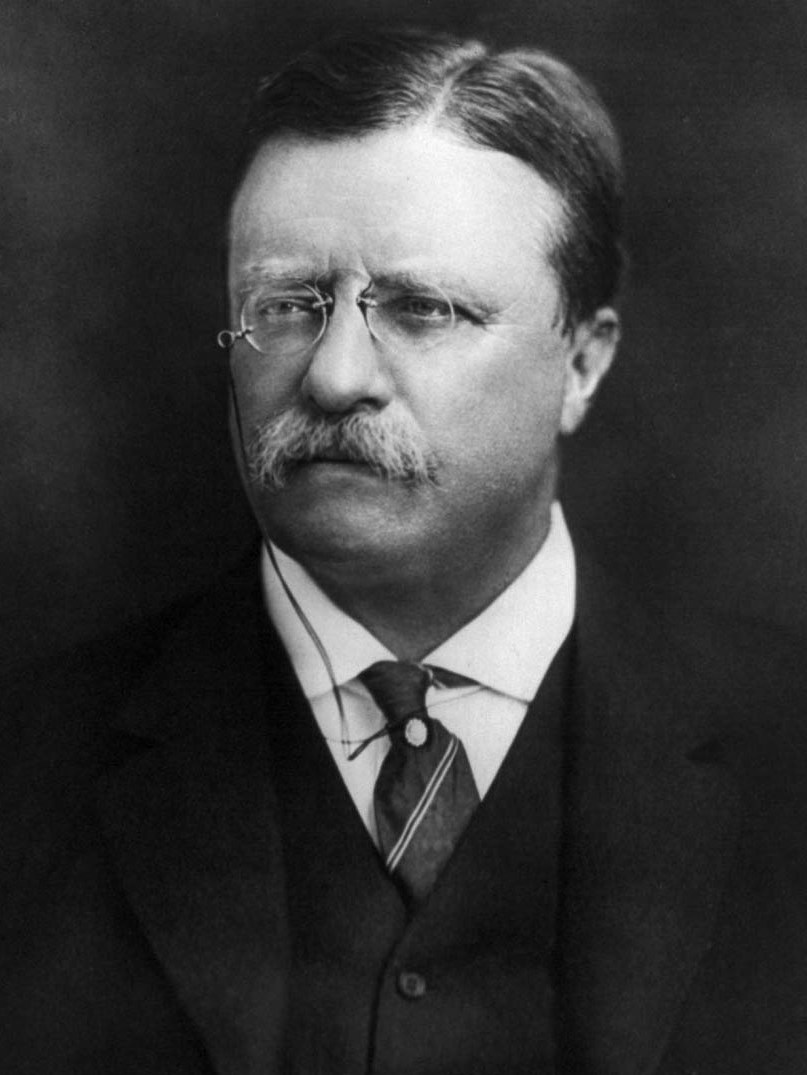
Nominee	Woodrow Wilson	William Howard Taft	Theodore Roosevelt
Party	Democratic	Republican	Progressive
Home state	New Jersey	Ohio	New York
Running mate	Thomas R. Marshall	Nicholas Murray Butler	Hiram Johnson
Electoral vote	5	0	0
Popular vote	30,412	27,703	16,878
Percentage	39.04%	35.56%	21.67%

Wilson
30–40%
40–50%
Taft
30–40%
40–50%
50–60%
70–80%
President before election
William Howard Taft
Republican
Elected President
Woodrow Wilson
Democratic

The 1912 United States presidential election in Rhode Island took place on November 5, 1912, as part of the 1912 United States presidential election which was held throughout all contemporary 48 states. Voters chose five representatives, or electors to the Electoral College, who voted for president and vice president.

Rhode Island was won by the Democratic Party nominees, New Jersey Governor Woodrow Wilson and Indiana Governor Thomas R. Marshall. Wilson and Marshall defeated incumbent President William Howard Taft, and his running mate Vice President James S. Sherman and Progressive Party candidates, former President Theodore Roosevelt and his running mate California Governor Hiram Johnson.

Wilson won Rhode Island by a narrow margin of 3.48 points, becoming the first Democratic presidential candidate since Franklin Pierce in 1852 to win the state. Wilson also became the first Democrat since Pierce to win Providence County or any county in the state. Another Democratic candidate wouldn't win Rhode Island again until Al Smith won it in 1928. This was the first of three times that the state voted differently than Minnesota, along with 1928 and 1984.

== Results ==
1912 United States presidential election in Rhode Island
Party	Candidate	Running mate	Popular vote		Electoral vote	
Party	Candidate	Running mate	Count	%	Count	%
Democratic	Woodrow Wilson of New Jersey	Thomas Riley Marshall of Indiana	30,412	39.04%	5	100.00%
Republican	William Howard Taft of Ohio	Nicholas Murray Butler of New York	27,703	35.56%	0	0.00%
Progressive	Theodore Roosevelt of New York	Hiram Warren Johnson of California	16,878	21.67%	0	0.00%
Socialist	Eugene Victor Debs of Indiana	Emil Seidel of Wisconsin	2,049	2.63%	0	0.00%
Prohibition	Eugene Wilder Chafin of Illinois	Aaron Sherman Watkins of Ohio	616	0.79%	0	0.00%
Socialist Labor	Arthur Elmer Reimer of Massachusetts	August Gillhaus of New York	236	0.30%	0	0.00%
Total			77,894	100.00%	5	100.00%

=== Results by town ===
1912 United States presidential election in Rhode Island by town
Town	Woodrow Wilson Democratic		William Howard Taft Republican		Theodore Roosevelt Progressive "Bull Moose"		Eugene V. Debs Socialist		Eugene W. Chafin Prohibition		Arthur E. Reimer Socialist Labor		Margin		Total votes cast
Town	#	%	#	%	#	%	#	%	#	%	#	%	#	%	Total votes cast
Barrington	98	26.85%	131	35.89%	121	33.15%	3	0.82%	12	3.29%	0	0.00%	10 (Note: In this town where Roosevelt ran ahead of Wilson, margin given is Taft vote minus Roosevelt vote and percentage margin is Taft percentage minus Roosevelt percentage.)	2.74%	365
Bristol	589	40.79%	629	43.56%	203	14.06%	13	0.90%	9	0.62%	1	0.07%	-40	-2.77%	1,444
Burrillville	596	39.06%	698	45.74%	187	12.25%	32	2.10%	5	0.33%	8	0.52%	-102	-6.68%	1,526
Central Falls	919	36.51%	1,100	43.70%	427	16.96%	52	2.07%	16	0.64%	3	0.12%	-181	-7.19%	2,517
Charlestown	40	17.62%	103	45.37%	64	28.19%	7	3.08%	10	4.41%	3	1.32%	39	17.18%	227
Coventry	324	37.33%	398	45.85%	124	14.29%	5	0.58%	16	1.84%	1	0.12%	-74	-8.53%	868
Cranston	1,282	34.08%	1,170	31.10%	1,164	30.94%	116	3.08%	24	0.64%	6	0.16%	112	2.98%	3,762
Cumberland	820	48.43%	635	37.51%	195	11.52%	34	2.01%	5	0.30%	4	0.24%	185	10.93%	1,693
East Greenwich	153	23.79%	267	41.52%	212	32.97%	3	0.47%	7	1.09%	1	0.16%	55	8.55%	643
East Providence	1,003	37.18%	783	29.02%	825	30.58%	51	1.89%	27	1.00%	9	0.33%	178 (Note: In this town where Roosevelt ran ahead of Taft, margin given is Wilson vote minus Roosevelt vote and percentage margin is Wilson percentage minus Roosevelt percentage.)	6.60%	2,698
Exeter	84	40.19%	95	45.45%	28	13.40%	0	0.00%	2	0.96%	0	0.00%	-11	-5.26%	209
Foster	108	39.13%	127	46.01%	39	14.13%	1	0.36%	1	0.36%	0	0.00%	-19	-6.88%	276
Glocester	128	33.33%	199	51.82%	50	13.02%	4	1.04%	3	0.78%	0	0.00%	-71	-18.49%	384
Hopkinton	113	26.28%	224	52.09%	75	17.44%	0	0.00%	17	3.95%	1	0.23%	-111	-25.81%	430
Jamestown	37	15.74%	109	46.38%	87	37.02%	0	0.00%	2	0.85%	0	0.00%	22	9.36%	235
Johnston	136	17.55%	454	58.58%	135	17.42%	41	5.29%	6	0.77%	3	0.39%	-318	-41.03%	775
Lincoln	511	37.63%	592	43.59%	169	12.44%	71	5.23%	8	0.59%	7	0.52%	-81	-5.96%	1,358
Little Compton	53	24.54%	122	56.48%	37	17.13%	3	1.39%	1	0.46%	0	0.00%	-69	-31.94%	216
Middletown	80	26.67%	137	45.67%	77	25.67%	1	0.33%	5	1.67%	0	0.00%	-57	-19.00%	300
Narragansett	140	48.11%	117	40.21%	32	11.00%	1	0.34%	1	0.34%	0	0.00%	23	7.90%	291
New Shoreham	138	37.50%	208	56.52%	21	5.71%	0	0.00%	1	0.27%	0	0.00%	-70	-19.02%	368
Newport	1,875	43.40%	1,463	33.87%	910	21.06%	42	0.97%	19	0.44%	11	0.25%	412	9.54%	4,320
North Kingstown	286	35.53%	359	44.60%	148	18.39%	1	0.12%	9	1.12%	2	0.25%	-73	-9.07%	805
North Providence	245	27.87%	419	47.67%	170	19.34%	39	4.44%	3	0.34%	3	0.34%	-174	-19.80%	879
North Smithfield	146	36.59%	190	47.62%	52	13.03%	5	1.25%	2	0.50%	4	1.00%	-44	-11.03%	399
Pawtucket	3,081	34.50%	4,055	45.41%	1,405	15.73%	280	3.14%	79	0.88%	30	0.34%	-974	-10.91%	8,930
Portsmouth	119	33.33%	157	43.98%	53	14.85%	2	0.56%	26	7.28%	0	0.00%	-38	-10.64%	357
Providence	12,429	43.98%	6,924	24.50%	7,542	26.69%	1,080	3.82%	188	0.67%	99	0.35%	4,887	17.29%	28,262
Richmond	97	32.23%	169	56.15%	24	7.97%	4	1.33%	6	1.99%	1	0.33%	-72	-23.92%	301
Scituate	396	47.14%	325	38.69%	96	11.43%	2	0.24%	18	2.14%	3	0.36%	71	8.45%	840
Smithfield	139	33.99%	208	50.86%	52	12.71%	6	1.47%	3	0.73%	1	0.24%	-69	-16.87%	409
South Kingstown	561	47.06%	472	39.60%	120	10.07%	19	1.59%	20	1.68%	0	0.00%	89	7.47%	1,192
Tiverton	185	27.45%	387	57.42%	94	13.95%	2	0.30%	5	0.74%	1	0.15%	-202	-29.97%	674
Warren	390	44.02%	366	41.31%	113	12.75%	5	0.56%	6	0.68%	6	0.68%	24	2.71%	886
Warwick	1,542	38.88%	1,428	36.01%	935	23.58%	32	0.81%	20	0.50%	9	0.23%	114	2.87%	3,966
West Greenwich	11	10.78%	77	75.49%	13	12.75%	0	0.00%	1	0.98%	0	0.00%	64	62.75%	102
Westerly	370	28.77%	590	45.88%	297	23.09%	7	0.54%	18	1.40%	4	0.31%	-220	-17.11%	1,286
Woonsocket	1,188	32.10%	1,816	49.07%	582	15.73%	85	2.30%	15	0.41%	15	0.41%	-628	-16.97%	3,701
Totals	30,412	39.04%	27,703	35.56%	16,878	21.67%	2,049	2.63%	616	0.79%	236	0.30%	2,709	3.48%	77,894

== See also ==
- United States presidential elections in Rhode Island
