= Rhode Island Route 98 =

State highway in Providence County, Rhode Island, US

Route 98
- Route 98 highlighted in red

Route information
- Maintained by RIDOT
- Length: 6.1 mi (9.8 km)

Major junctions
- South end: Route 100 in Chepachet
- North end: Route 98 in Uxbridge, MA

Location
- Country: United States
- State: Rhode Island
- Counties: Providence

Highway system
- Rhode Island Routes
← Route 96	→ Route 99

Route 98 is a numbered state highway running 6.1 miles (9.8 km) in Rhode Island. Route 98's southern terminus is at Route 100 in Chepachet and the northern terminus is a continuation as Massachusetts Route 98 near Uxbridge, Massachusetts.

== Route description ==
Route 98 travels through some very rural and scenic areas of Burrillville.

Route 98 takes the following route through the State:

- Chepachet (Town of Glocester): 0.3 miles (0.48 km): Route 100 to Burrillville town line
  - Steere Farm Road
- Burrillville: 5.8 miles (9.3 km); Glocester town line to Massachusetts State line at Route 98
  - Steere Farm Road, Harrisville Main Street, and Sherman Farm Road

== Major intersections ==
The entire route is in Providence County.

Location	mi	km	Destinations	Notes
Chepachet	0.0	0.0	Route 100 (Money Hill Road) to Route 102 / US 44	Southern terminus
Harrisville	2.7	4.3	Route 107 east (East Avenue)	Southern end of Route 107 concurrency
Burrillville	2.8	4.5	Route 107 west (Chapel Street)	Northern end of Route 107 concurrency
Burrillville	3.0	4.8	Route 96 north (Callahan School Street)	Southern end of Route 96
Burrillville	6.1	9.8	Route 98 north – Uxbridge	Continuation into Massachusetts
1.000 mi = 1.609 km; 1.000 km = 0.621 mi: Concurrency terminus
