= George Spaulding =

George Spaulding may refer to

- George L. Spaulding (1864 –1921), American songwriter
- George W. Spaulding (1843–1908), American architect

== See also ==
- George Spalding (1836–1915) U.S. congressman from Michigan
