= George W. Spaulding =

American architect (1843–1908)

- Born: June 29, 1843; Pascoag, Rhode Island, U.S.
- Died: February 1, 1908 (aged 64); Woonsocket, Rhode Island, U.S.
- Burial place: Oak Hill Cemetery, Woonsocket
- Occupation: Architect
- Years active: 1885–1908
- Spouse: Hattie Olivia Elliot
- Children: Edgar Leroy Spaulding
- Projects: Unity Building, Woonsocket (1886); St. Andrew's Episcopal Chapel, Woonsocket (1894); Bridgeton School, Burrillville (1897)

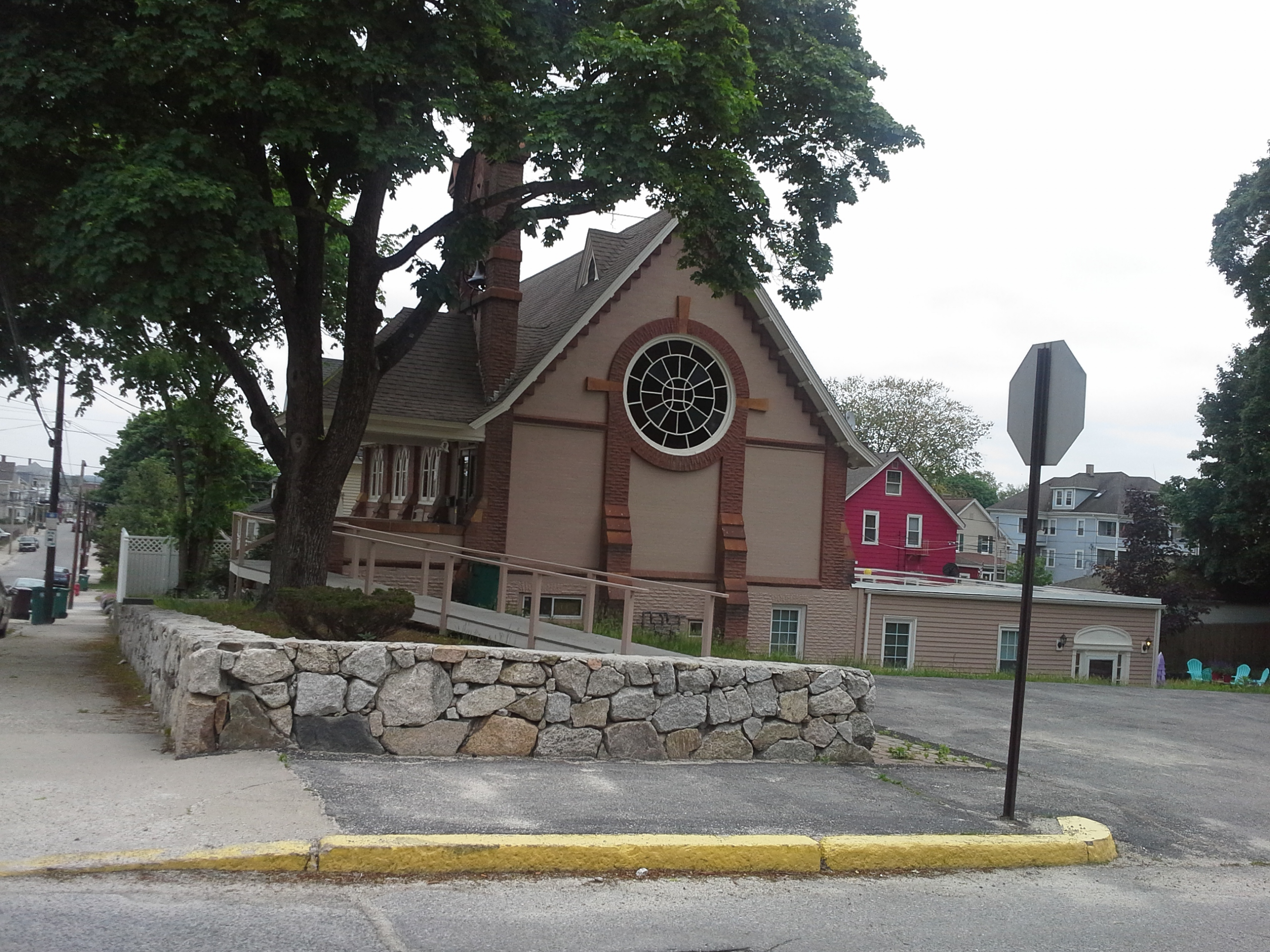
St. Andrew's Episcopal Chapel in Woonsocket, Rhode Island, completed in 1894

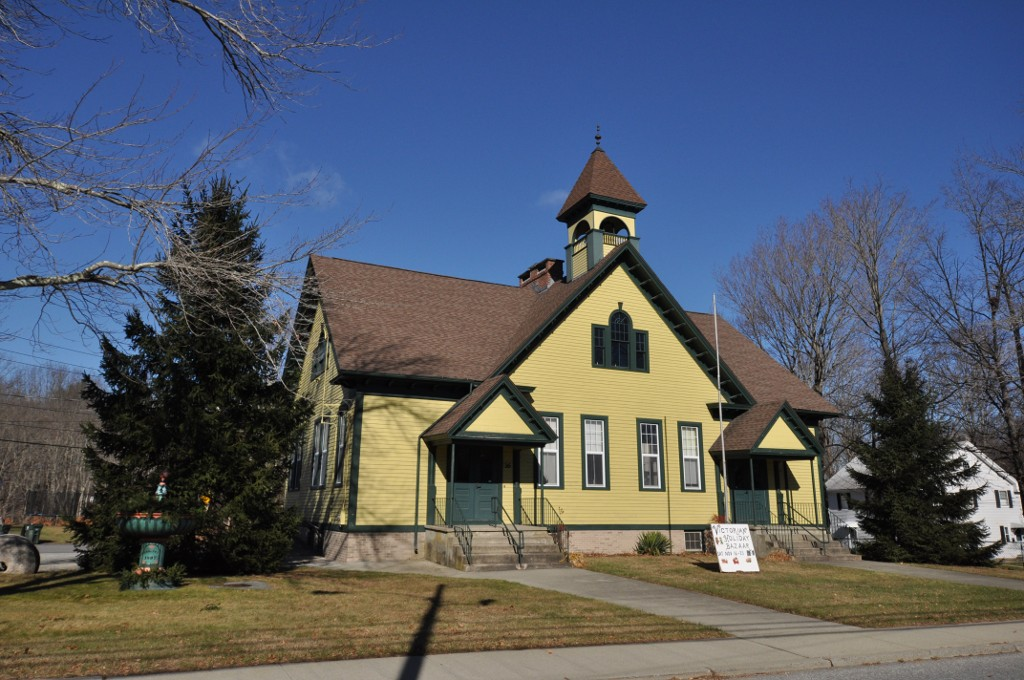
The former Bridgeton School in Burrillville, Rhode Island, completed in 1897

George W. Spaulding (June 29, 1843 – February 1, 1908) was an American architect from Woonsocket, Rhode Island.

== Life and career ==
George Willard Spaulding was born June 29, 1843, in Pascoag, Rhode Island, to Willard Danielson Spaulding and Clarissa Danforth (Ballard) Spaulding. He was trained in mechanical drafting and engineering and came to Woonsocket in 1869, where he worked as a mechanical engineer for the Woonsocket Machine and Press Company. In 1885, he established himself as an architect in Woonsocket. In later life he worked with his son, Edgar L. Spaulding, who succeeded him, though he retired from architecture not long after his father's death.

== Personal life ==
Spaulding married Hattie Olivia Elliot. They had one son, Edgar Leroy Spaulding.

Spaulding was a parishioner of St. James Episcopal Church. died February 1, 1908, aged 64, in Woonsocket, Rhode Island. He is buried in Oak Hill Cemetery.

== Legacy ==
Two of Spaulding's buildings have been listed on the United States National Register of Historic Places, and others contribute to listed historic districts.

== Architectural works ==
- Unity Building, (Note: A contributing property to the Main Street Historic District, NRHP-listed in 1991.) 1 Clinton St, Woonsocket, Rhode Island (1886)
- Foss Memorial Building, 185 Main St, Woonsocket, Rhode Island (1887, demolished)
- House, (Note: A contributing property to the South Main Street Historic District, NRHP-listed in 1982.) 510 S Main St, Woonsocket, Rhode Island (1892)
- Odd Fellows Hall, Bernon St, Woonsocket, Rhode Island (1893, demolished)
- Forestdale Mill additions, (Note: Though it has been demolished, the mill was a contributing property to the Forestdale Mill Village Historic District, NRHP-listed in 1972.) 119 School St, Forestdale, Rhode Island (1894, demolished)
- St. Andrew's Episcopal Chapel (former), 576 Fairmont St, Woonsocket, Rhode Island (1894, NRHP 1982)
- Colchis Mill, River St, Woonsocket, Rhode Island (1896)
- Bridgeton School (former), 16 Laurel Hill Ave, Burrillville, Rhode Island (1897, NRHP 2006)
- Mapleville School (former), 5 Sandhill Rd, Burrillville, Rhode Island (1898)

Spaulding was also one of two local architects who competed for the design of the Woonsocket District Courthouse in 1894.
