= 2012 United States presidential election in Rhode Island =

- November 6, 2012
- Turnout: 60.8% ▼6.1 pp

Nominee	Barack Obama	Mitt Romney
Party	Democratic	Republican
Home state	Illinois	Massachusetts
Running mate	Joe Biden	Paul Ryan
Electoral vote	4	0
Popular vote	279,677	157,204
Percentage	62.70%	35.24%

Obama
40–50%
50–60%
60–70%
70–80%
80–90%
90–100%
Romney
40–50%
50–60%
President before election
Barack Obama
Democratic
Elected President
Barack Obama
Democratic

The 2012 United States presidential election in Rhode Island took place on November 6, 2012, as part of the 2012 United States presidential election in which all 50 states plus the District of Columbia participated. Rhode Island voters chose four electors to represent them in the Electoral College via a popular vote pitting incumbent Democratic President Barack Obama and his running mate, Vice President Joe Biden, against Republican challenger and former Massachusetts Governor Mitt Romney and his running mate, Congressman Paul Ryan.

Also on the ballot were Libertarian nominee, former New Mexico Governor Gary Johnson and his running mate, jurist Jim Gray. The left-wing Green Party nominated activist and physician Jill Stein and her running mate, anti-poverty advocate Cheri Honkala.

Rhode Island was won by Democratic nominee Obama by a 27.46% margin of victory. This was the seventh straight win for the Democratic Party in Rhode Island on the presidential level. It was also the seventh time in a row that the Democratic nominee for president won all 5 counties – a streak which would be broken when Donald Trump won Kent County in 2016 – and the sixth consecutive time that a Republican nominee failed to break 40% of the vote in Rhode Island. Rhode Island has been a safe Democratic state since 1988, and has only voted for a Republican nominee four times since 1928 (all of which in landslide elections). State politics are dominated by the Providence and Warwick metropolitan areas, and Providence County gave Obama his largest margin in the state at 34.92%. However, white working class voters in the inland and diverse, urban voters on the coast alike consistently vote Democratic, enough to provide the Democratic nominee with landslide margins in each election.

To date, this is the last time that the towns of Burrillville, Coventry, Exeter, Foster, Glocester, Hopkinton, Johnston, North Smithfield, and Smithfield voted Democratic, and the last time that the town of East Greenwich voted Republican.

== Primary elections ==
=== Democratic primary ===
The 2012 Rhode Island Democratic primary was held April 24, 2012. Rhode Island awarded 40 delegates proportionally.

No candidate ran against incumbent President Barack Obama in Rhode Island's Democratic presidential preference primary. Obama received 6,759 votes, or 83.38% of the vote, with 1,133 uncommitted votes (13.98%) and 214 write-in votes (2.64%)

At the Rhode Island Democratic state convention held on June 21, 2012, 35 delegates were awarded to Barack Obama, with 5 delegates remaining unannounced.

Rhode Island 2012 Democratic presidential primary
Candidate	Votes	Percentage	Awarded Delegates
Barack Obama (incumbent)	6,759	83.38%	35
Uncommitted	1,133	13.98%	
Write-in	214	2.64%	
Unannounced			5
Totals	8,106	100.00%	40

=== Republican primary ===
2012 Rhode Island Republican presidential primary
- April 24, 2012

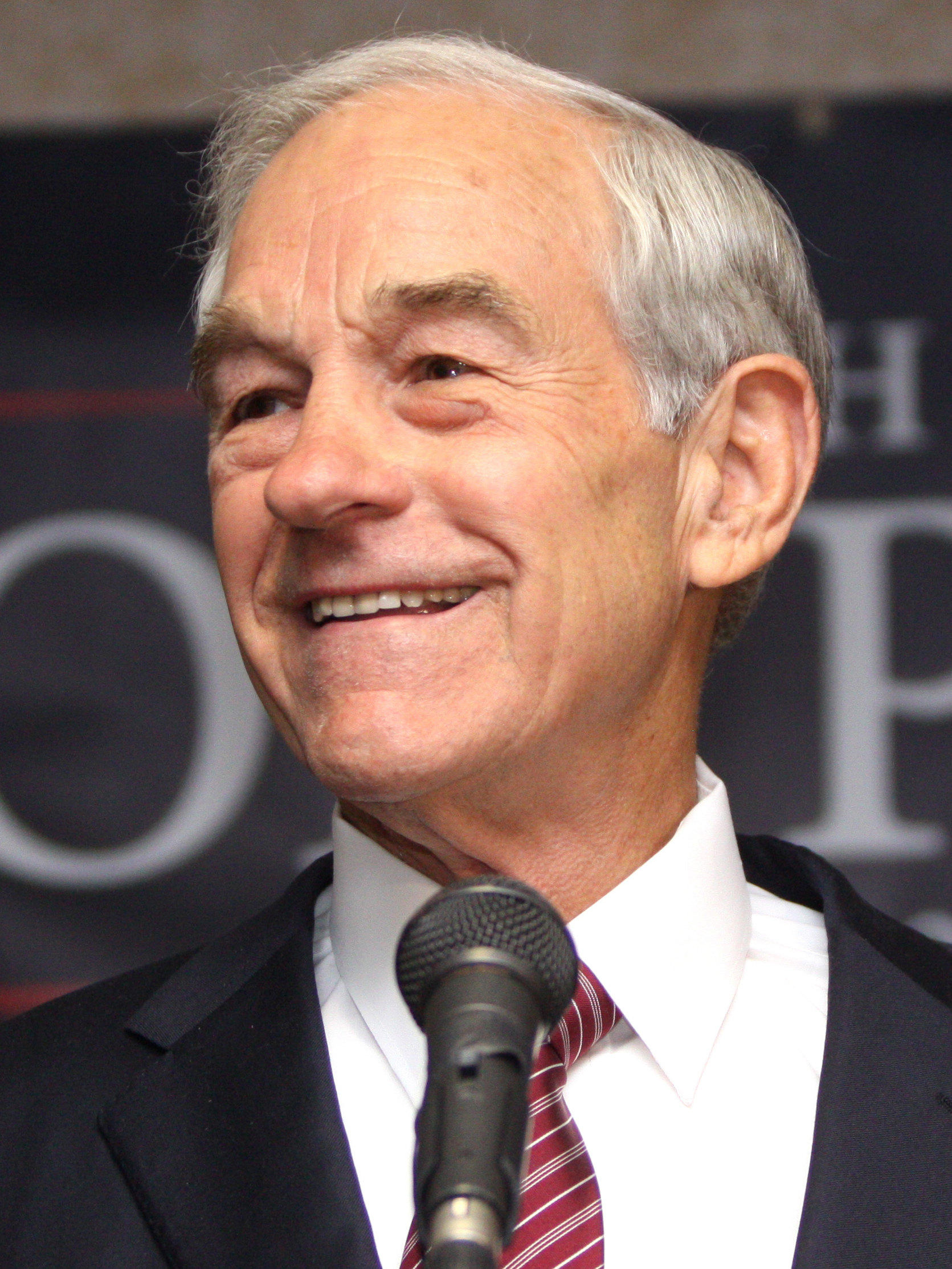

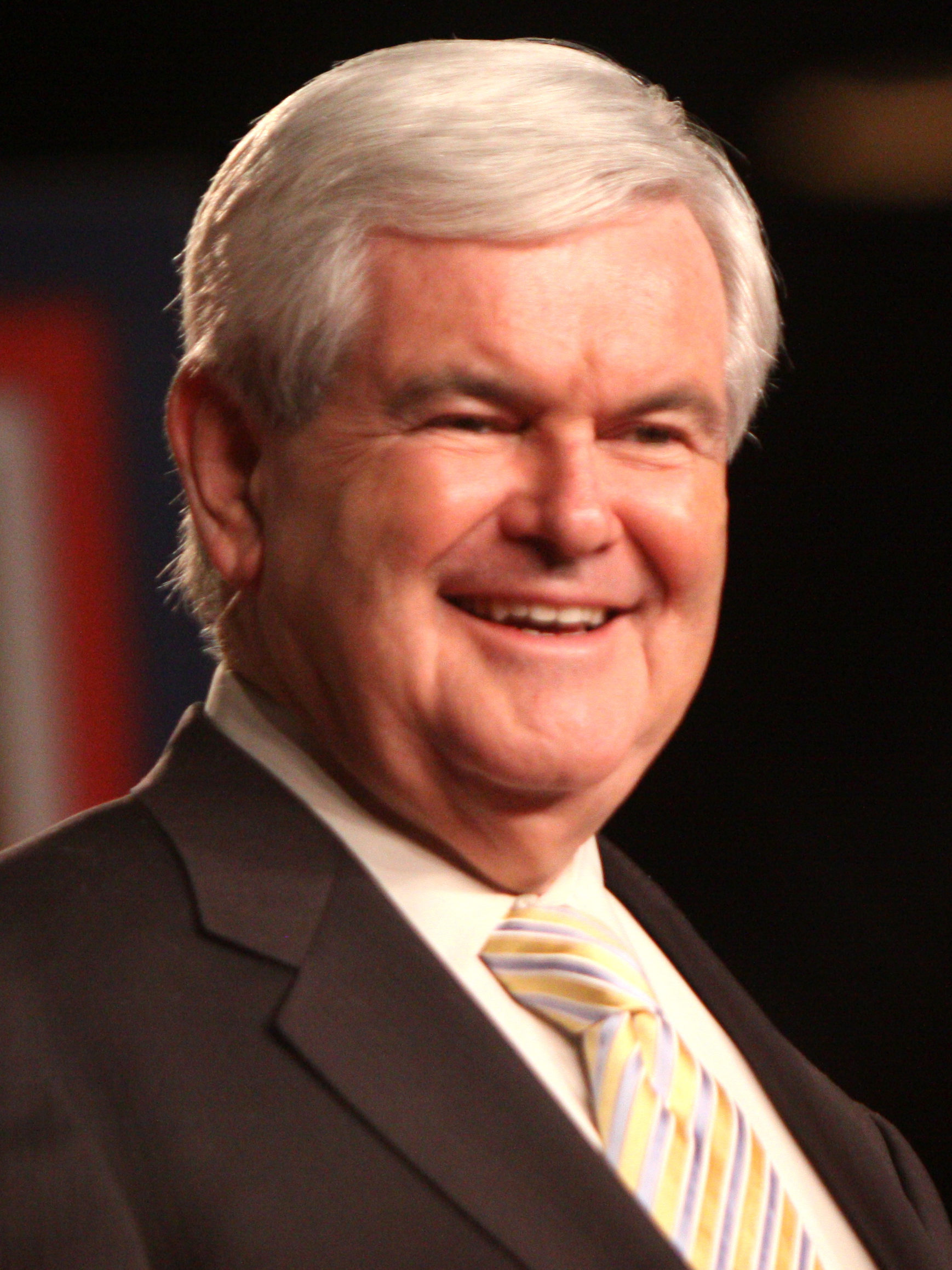
Candidate	Mitt Romney	Ron Paul	Newt Gingrich
Home state	Massachusetts	Texas	Georgia
Delegate count	12	4	0
Popular vote	9,157	3,462	878
Percentage	63.02%	23.85%	6.04%
- Rhode Island results by county Mitt Romney

The 2012 Rhode Island Republican presidential primary took place on April 24, 2012. Former Massachusetts Governor and frontrunner Mitt Romney received 63.02% of the vote, followed by U.S. Representative from Texas Ron Paul with 23.85% and former Speaker of the House Newt Gingrich with 6.04%. Former U.S. Senator from Pennsylvania Rick Santorum, who dropped out on April 10, received 5.66% of the vote.

2012 Rhode Island Republican presidential primary
Candidate	Votes	Percentage	Delegates
Mitt Romney	9,178	63.02%	12
Ron Paul	3,473	23.85%	4
Newt Gingrich	880	6.04%	0
Rick Santorum	825	5.66%	0
Uncommitted	131	0.90%	3
Buddy Roemer	40	0.27%	0
Write-in	37	0.25%	0
Unprojected delegates:			0
Total:	14,564	100%	19

== General election ==
=== Predictions ===
Source	Ranking	As of
Huffington Post	Safe D	November 6, 2012
CNN	Safe D	November 6, 2012
New York Times	Safe D	November 6, 2012
Washington Post	Safe D	November 6, 2012
RealClearPolitics	Solid D	November 6, 2012
Sabato's Crystal Ball	Solid D	November 5, 2012
FiveThirtyEight	Solid D	November 6, 2012

=== Results ===
2012 United States presidential election in Rhode Island
Party	Candidate	Running mate	Votes	Percentage	Electoral votes
Democratic	Barack Obama (incumbent)	Joe Biden (incumbent)	279,677	62.70%	4
Republican	Mitt Romney	Paul Ryan	157,204	35.24%	0
Libertarian	Gary Johnson	Jim Gray	4,388	0.98%	0
Green	Jill Stein	Cheri Honkala	2,421	0.54%	0
Others & write-in			2,359	0.53%	0
Totals			446,049	100.00%	4
Voter turnout					60.79%

==== By county ====
County	Barack Obama Democratic		Mitt Romney Republican		Various candidates Other parties		Margin		Total votes cast
County	#	%	#	%	#	%	#	%	Total votes cast
Bristol	14,974	60.68%	9,231	37.41%	471	1.91%	5,743	23.27%	24,676
Kent	45,564	57.73%	31,567	40.00%	1,792	2.27%	13,997	17.73%	78,923
Newport	23,463	59.47%	15,202	38.53%	787	2.00%	8,261	20.94%	39,452
Providence	159,520	66.53%	75,785	31.61%	4,481	1.86%	83,735	34.92%	239,786
Washington	35,888	57.07%	25,366	40.34%	1,625	2.59%	10,522	16.73%	62,879
Totals	279,677	62.70%	157,204	35.24%	9,168	2.06%	122,473	27.46%	446,049

==== By congressional district ====
Obama won both congressional districts.

District	Obama	Romney	Representative
1st	66.21%	32.18%	David Cicilline
2nd	59.84%	38.29%	James Langevin

== See also ==
- United States presidential elections in Rhode Island
- 2012 Republican Party presidential debates and forums
- 2012 Republican Party presidential primaries
- Results of the 2012 Republican Party presidential primaries
- Rhode Island Republican Party
