= Utah State Route 98 =

State Route 98

Location
- Country: United States
- State: Utah

Highway system
- Utah State Highway System; Interstate; US; State; Minor; Scenic
← SR-97	→ SR-99

Utah State Route 98 may refer to:

- Utah State Route 98 (1969–2000), a former state highway in western Weber County, Utah, United States, that connected Utah State Route 27 in Hooper with Utah State Route 108 in Roy (it was added to Utah State Route 97 in 2000)
- Utah State Route 98 (1935-1969), a former state highway in western Iron County, Utah, United States, that connected Utah State Route 56 at Beryl Junction with Beryl

== See also ==
- List of state highways in Utah
- List of highways numbered 98
