= 1852 United States presidential election in Rhode Island =

- November 2, 1852

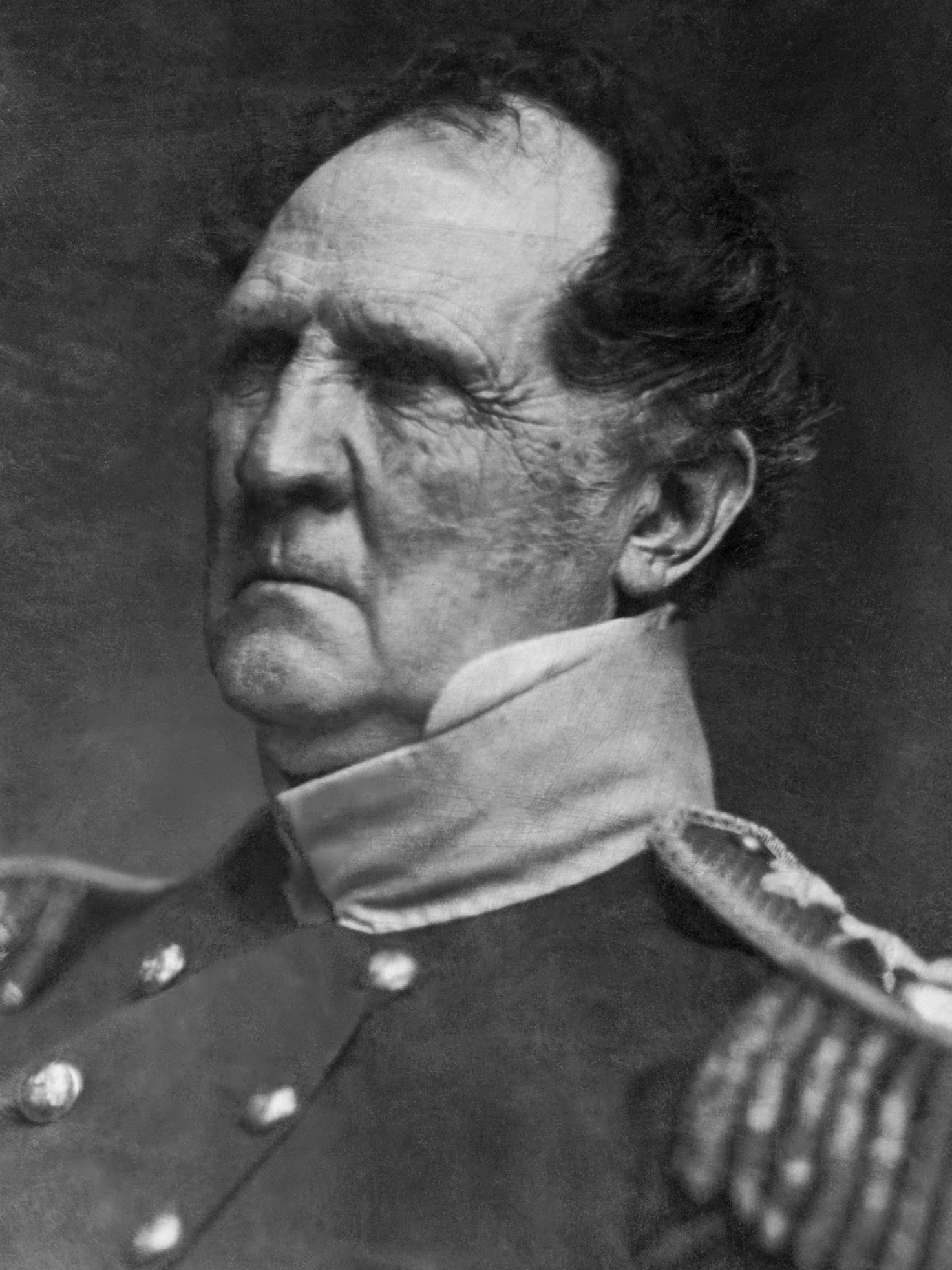
Nominee	Franklin Pierce	Winfield Scott
Party	Democratic	Whig
Home state	New Hampshire	New Jersey
Running mate	William R. King	William Alexander Graham
Electoral vote	4	0
Popular vote	8,735	7,626
Percentage	51.37%	44.85%
County results
Pierce
40–50%
50–60%
Scott
50–60%
60–70%
President before election
Millard Fillmore
Whig
Elected President
Franklin Pierce
Democratic

The 1852 United States presidential election in Rhode Island took place on November 2, 1852, as part of the 1852 United States presidential election. Voters chose four representatives, or electors to the Electoral College, who voted for President and Vice President.

Rhode Island voted for the Democratic candidate, Franklin Pierce, over the Whig Party candidate, Winfield Scott. Pierce won the state by a margin of 6.52%. This was the first of three times that the state voted differently than Massachusetts (along with 1972 and 1980).

This would be the final time until 1912 that a Democratic presidential candidate was able to win Rhode Island and the final time until 1928 that a Democratic candidate won a majority of the popular vote.

== Results ==
1852 United States presidential election in Rhode Island
Party	Candidate	Running mate	Popular vote		Electoral vote	
Party	Candidate	Running mate	Count	%	Count	%
Democratic	Franklin Pierce of New Hampshire	William R. King of Alabama	8,735	51.37%	4	100.00%
Whig	Winfield Scott of New Jersey	William Alexander Graham of North Carolina	7,626	44.85%	0	0.00%
Free Soil	John P. Hale of New Hampshire	George W. Julian of Indiana	644	3.79%	0	0.00%
Total			17,005	100.00%	4	100.00%

== See also ==
- United States presidential elections in Rhode Island
