= Esten–Bowen House =

Historic house in Rhode Island, United States

- U.S. National Register of Historic Places
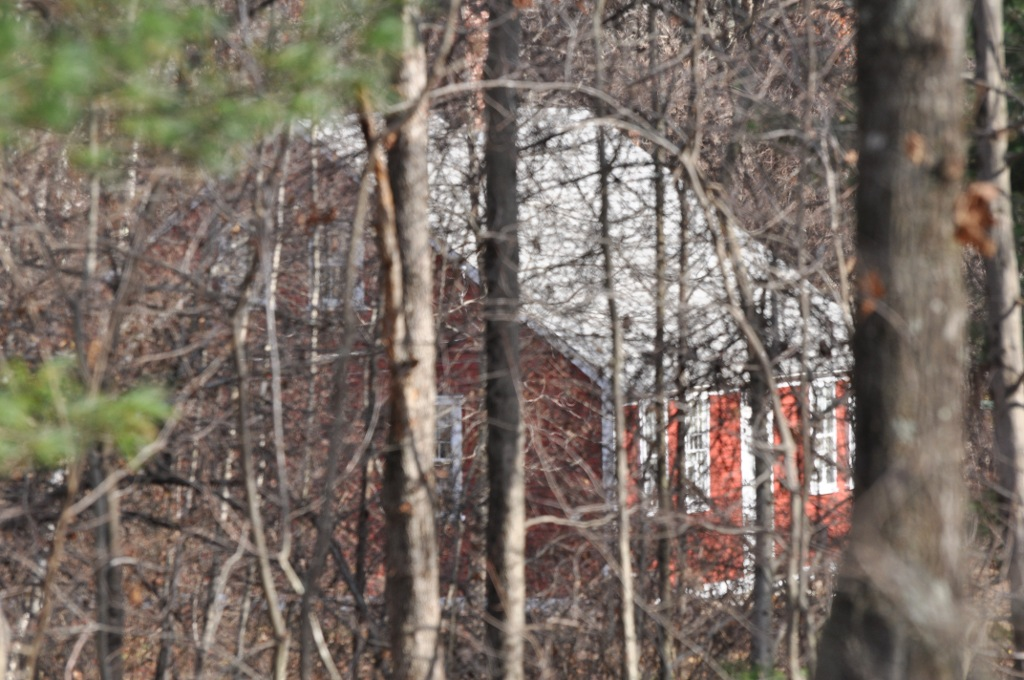

- Location within Rhode Island Location within the United States
- Location: 299 Ironmine Road, Burrillville, Rhode Island
- Coordinates: 42°0′17″N 71°38′17″W
- Area: 32.5 acres (13.2 ha)
- Built: c. 1790
- Built by: John Esten
- Architectural style: Cape
- NRHP reference No.: 11000978
- Added to NRHP: December 30, 2011

The Esten–Bowen House is a historic house at 299 Ironmine Road in Burrillville, Rhode Island. The 1 1/2-story timber frame Cape style house was built c. 1790 by John Esten, a major landowner in eastern Burrillville in the second half of the 18th century. The main block is five bays wide and two deep, with a massive central chimney. A kitchen ell to the right of the main block appears to be an early addition. The house was held in the Esten family until 1879, by which time its surrounding property had been reduced to just 30 acres (12 ha). This property was acquired by Esther Bowen in 1941 and the house was rehabilitated, with modest Colonial Revival alterations. The property includes a 19th-century shed, and foundational remnants of a blacksmithy and barn.

The house was listed on the National Register of Historic Places in 2011.

== See also ==
- National Register of Historic Places listings in Providence County, Rhode Island
