= Henry Francis Walling =

American civil engineer and cartographer (1825–1889)

Henry Francis Walling (June 11, 1825 - April 8, 1889) was an American civil engineer and cartographer.

Walling was born in Burrillville, Rhode Island, where he was educated at public schools. After graduation he became an assistant librarian in the Providence Athenaeum, during which time he studied mathematics and surveying. He then entered the office of Samuel Barrett Cushing, a civil engineer in Providence, whose partner he became in 1846. He began topographic work in 1849, and prepared atlases containing full maps and scientific descriptions of most of the northern American states and the Dominion of Canada. After preparing at least 50 town maps in the Massachusetts vicinity, in 1855 he became the Commonwealth's Superintendent of the State Map. In 1856 he moved to New York City for its quality lithographers.

In 1867 Walling became chair of civil engineering in Lafayette, in which role he served for three years, but then resigned to accept an appointment as assistant in the Office of Coast Survey. He joined the newly-formed United States Geological Survey in 1883, and in 1884 was assigned to duty for the geodetic survey of Massachusetts in preparation of the state maps, on which work he was engaged at the time of his death.

Walling was a Fellow of the American Association for the Advancement of Science and of the American Society of Civil Engineers.

Wallings died of a heart attack in Cambridge, Massachusetts in 1889.
