= Glendale, Rhode Island =

Village in Burrillville, Rhode Island, US

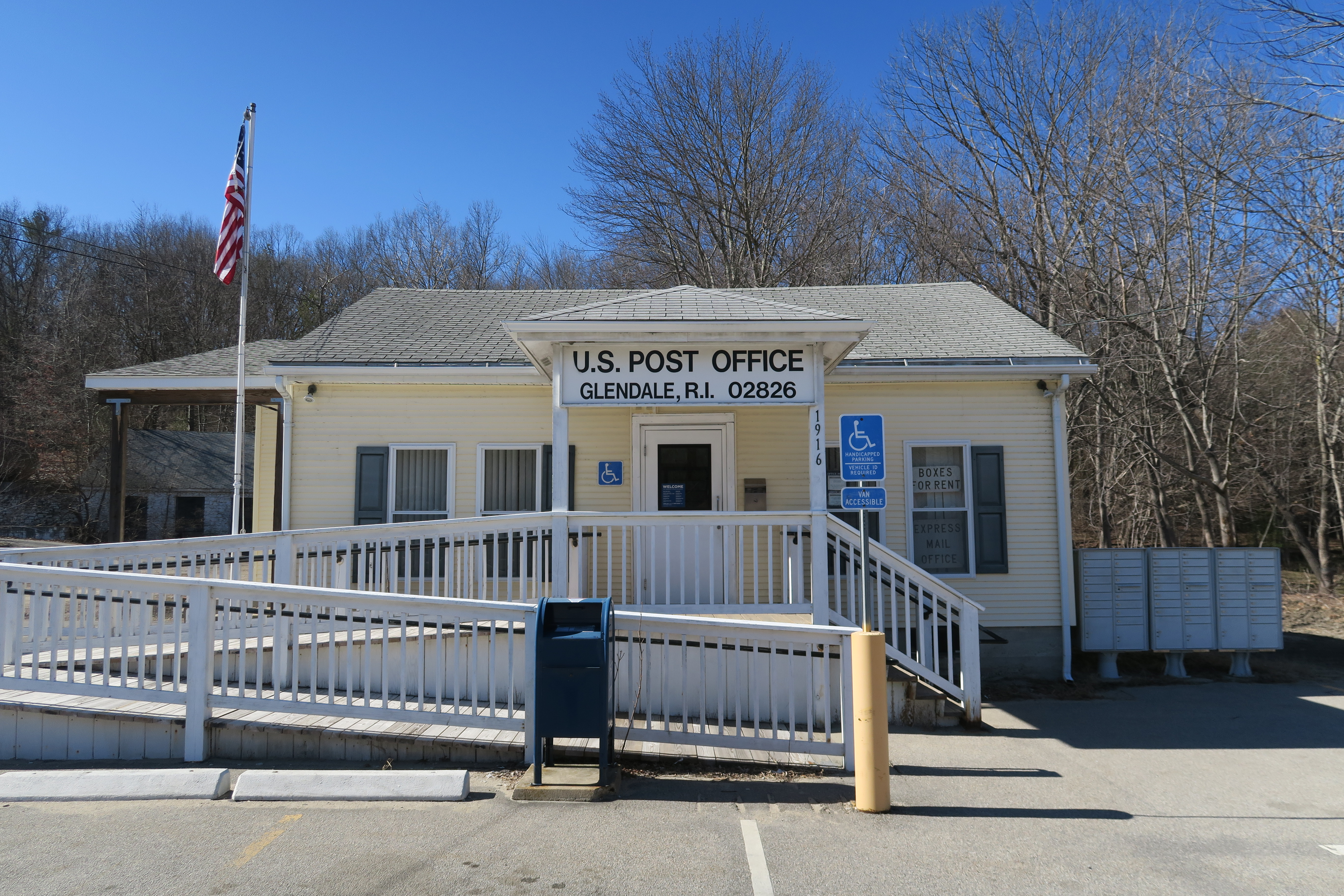
Post Office

Glendale is a village in the town of Burrillville, Rhode Island, United States. It is located at 41°58′34″N 71°37′59″W. The United States Postal Service has assigned Glendale the ZIP Code 02826.
