= Nasonville, Rhode Island =

Village in Burrillville, Rhode Island, US

Coordinates: 41°58′54″N 71°37′00″W

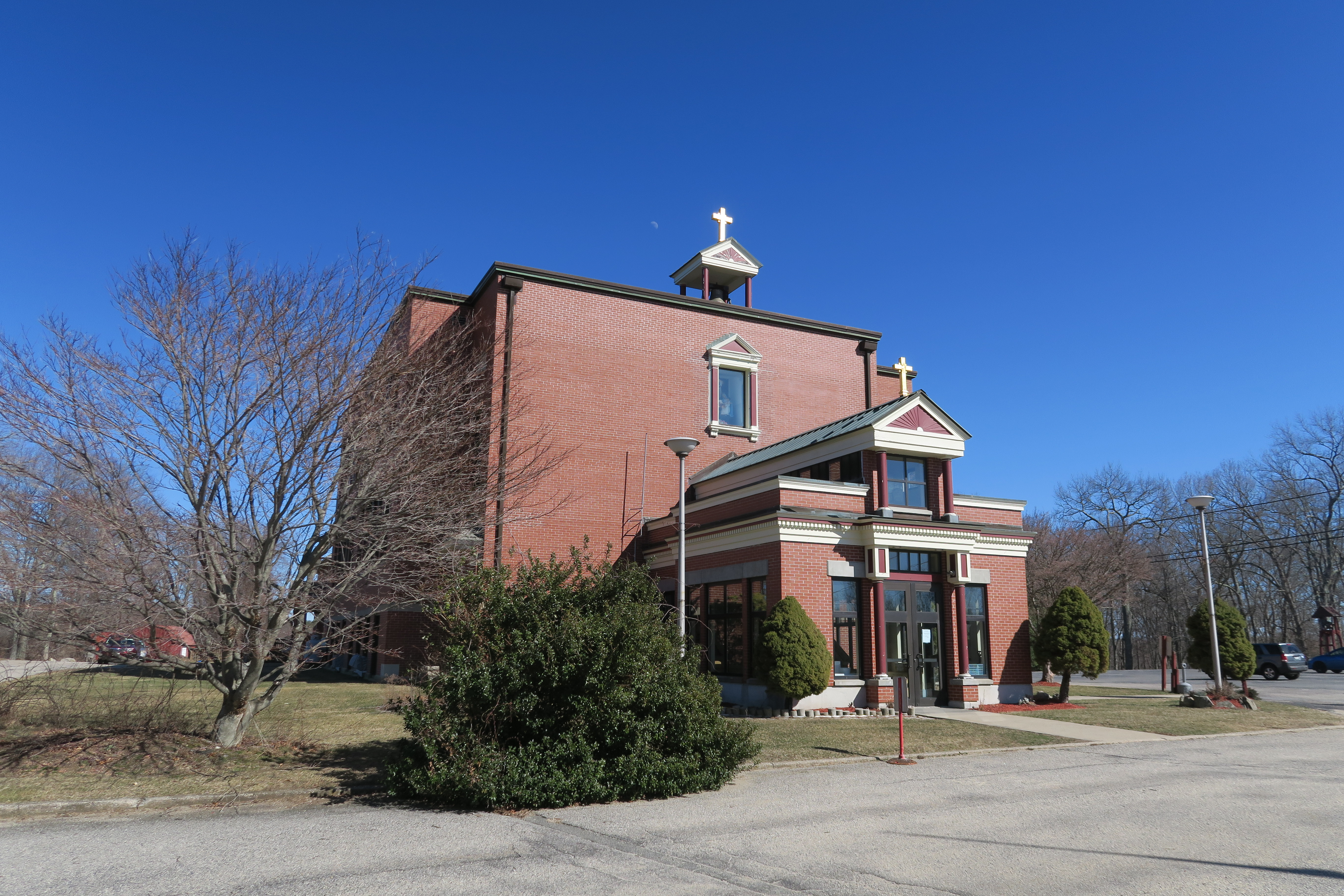
St. Theresa Catholic Church

Nasonville is a village in Burrillville, Rhode Island, United States. It was home to various manufacturers in the 19th century. The village was founded by Leonard Nason in 1825 when he purchased land along the river to found an axe and hoe factory.

As of 2024, the village contains the Shrine of the Little Flower, Rhode Island's only catholic shrine. It honors Saint Thérèse of Lisieux and in 2023, the shrine celebrated its centennial jubilee.
