= Mapleville, Rhode Island =

Village in Burrillville, Rhode Island, US

Coordinates: 41°56′53″N 71°38′55″W

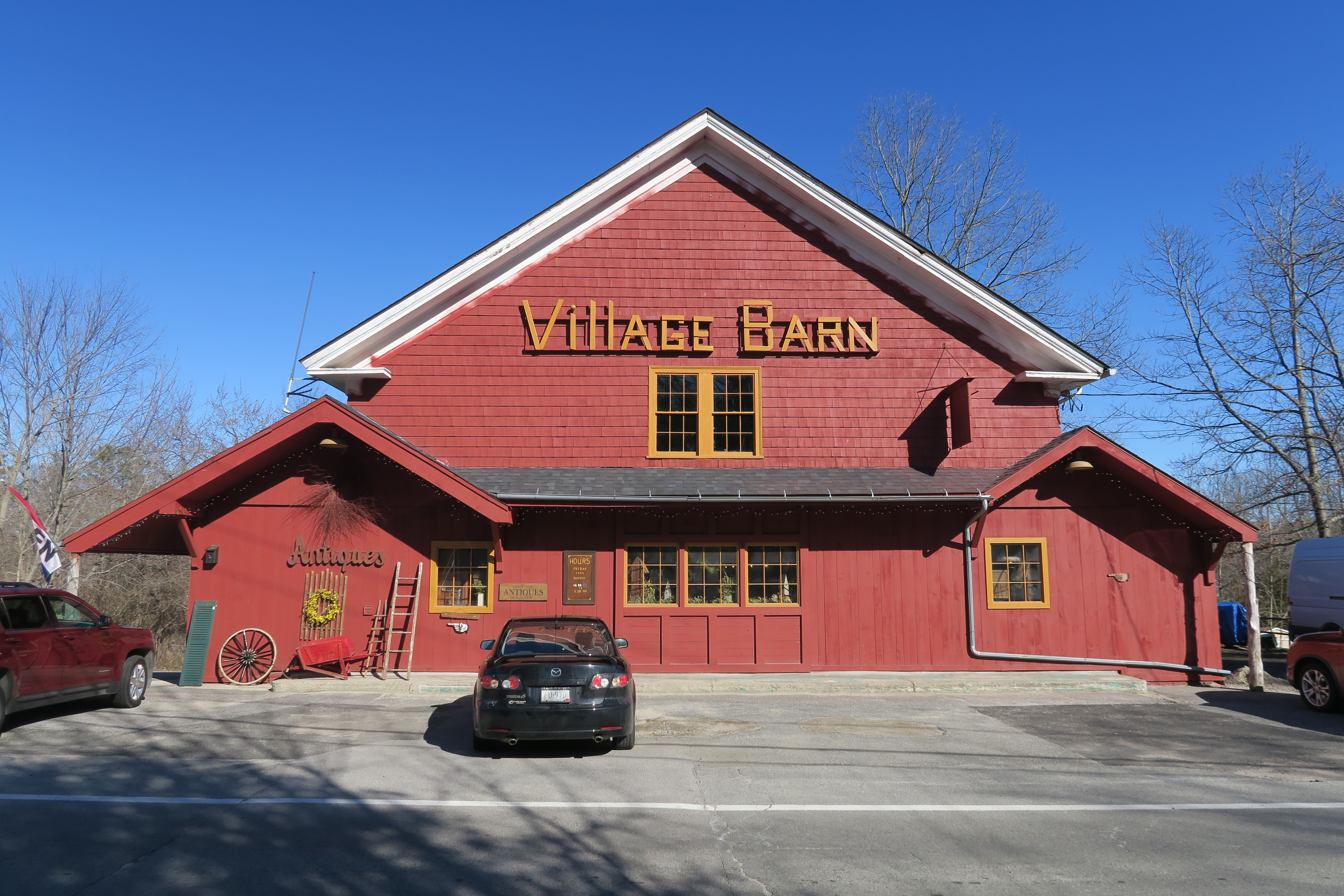
Village Barn

Mapleville is a village in Burrillville, Providence County, Rhode Island, formerly home to various manufacturers in the 19th century. The village is home to a post office, fire station, churches, and various businesses.

== History ==
Mapleville was originally founded as a settlement called Cooper's Mills.

In 1786, a group of Quakers began meeting in the area and they built a meeting house there in 1791.

The first half of the 19th century saw textile and lumber mills established there. In 1900, there were 54 company-owned tenements in the settlement, with 30 new homes and a brick mill being built soon after. The brick mill became the Coronet Worsted Company.

Two churches were built at the beginning of the 20th century: the Our Lady of Good Help Catholic church was built in 1907 and the Mapleville Methodist Episcopal Church was dedicated in 1909.
