= St. Andrew's Episcopal Chapel (Woonsocket, Rhode Island) =

Historic church in Rhode Island, United States

- St. Andrews Episcopal Chapel
- U.S. National Register of Historic Places
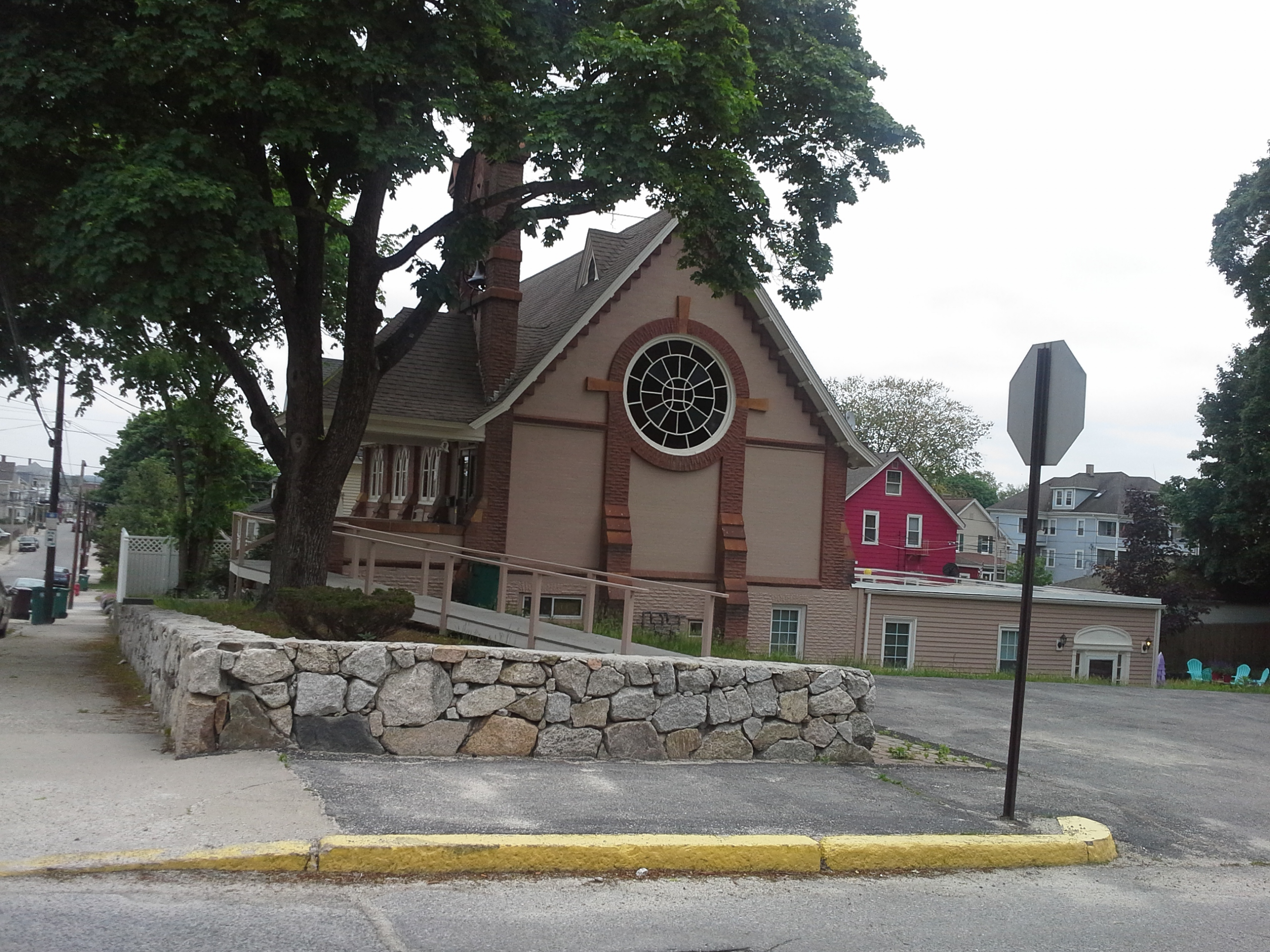

- Location within Rhode Island Location within the United States
- Location: Woonsocket, Rhode Island
- Coordinates: 42°0′3″N 71°31′54″W
- Built: 1894
- Architect: Spaulding, George W.
- Architectural style: Late Victorian
- MPS: Woonsocket MRA
- NRHP reference No.: 82000005
- Added to NRHP: November 24, 1982

St. Andrew's Episcopal Chapel is an historic Episcopal church located at 576 Fairmont Street in Woonsocket, Rhode Island.

The late-Victorian style church was designed by George W. Spaulding in 1894 as "a mission chapel by St. James Episcopal Parish of Woonsocket in 1894 to serve the new and growing working-class Fairmount neighborhood. Many of the building components were donated by area residents and corporations. The lot was a gift of the Fairmount Land Company; architect and St. James parishioner George Spaulding donated the plans and building specifications; the Granite Pressed Brick Company, also of Woonsocket, donated the distinctive pressed concrete brick; Edgar H. Slocum provided painting services free of charge; Hark Hough provided the bell and in 1897, the Gilbert & Butler Company of Boston gave the pipe organ." The building was added to the National Register of Historic Places in 1982 as part of the South Main Street Historic District of Woonsocket.

The Episcopal congregation sold the structure prior to 1981 and it has since passed to a number of other congregations. As of 2008 was used as a holistic counseling center.

As of 2013 it has become a private residence.

== See also ==
- National Register of Historic Places listings in Woonsocket, Rhode Island
