= Bridgeton School =

- U.S. National Register of Historic Places
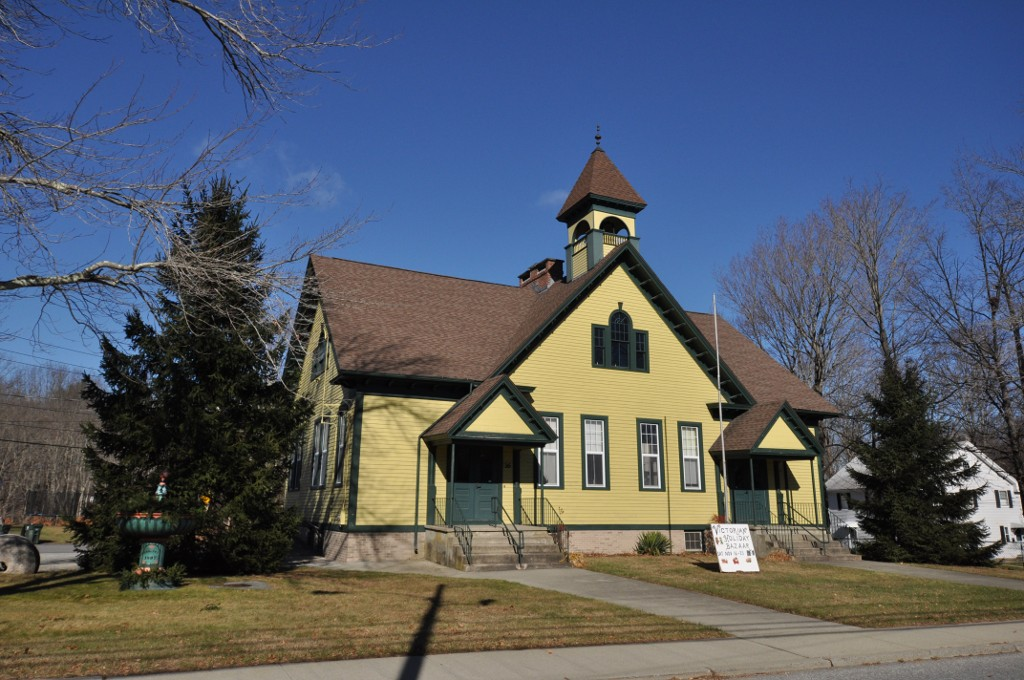

- Location within Rhode Island Location within the United States
- Location: Burrillville, Rhode Island
- Coordinates: 41.9649°N 71.71258°W
- Built: 1897
- Architect: George W. Spaulding; Nehemiah Kimball; William H. Gory
- Architectural style: Late Victorian
- NRHP reference No.: 06001191
- Added to NRHP: December 27, 2006

The Bridgeton School is a historic school building located at 16 Laurel Hill Avenue in Burrillville, Rhode Island.

The 1 1/2-story wood-frame schoolhouse was designed by George W. Spaulding and built in 1897 by Nehemiah Kimball and William H. Gory. It served the Burrillville public schools until 1966. In 1970, it was reopened for use as a kindergarten as the Joseph Sweeney School. It was closed in 1995, and was then transferred to the Burrillville Historical and Preservation Society. It is the best preserved of Burrillville's late 19th-century school buildings.

The building was listed on the National Register of Historic Places in 2006.

== See also ==
- National Register of Historic Places listings in Providence County, Rhode Island
