= A96 =

A96 or A-96 may refer to:

- A96 road (Scotland), a road connecting Aberdeen and Inverness
- Bundesautobahn 96, a motorway between Lake Constance and Munich in Germany
- Dutch Defence, in the Encyclopaedia of Chess Openings
