= N96 =

N96 may refer to:

- Bellefonte Airport, in Pennsylvania, United States
- HMS Phoenix (N96), a submarine of the Royal Navy
- Nebraska Highway 96, in the United States
- Nokia N96, a smartphone
