= N97 =

N97 may refer to:

- Daxian N97, a Chinese mobile phone
- Djinba language
- HMS Urchin (N97), a submarine of the Royal Navy
- London Buses route N97
- Nebraska Highway 97, in the United States
- Nokia N97, a Finnish mobile phone
