= A98 =

A98 or A-98 may refer to:

- A98 road (Great Britain), a major road in the UK
- A 98 motorway (Germany)
- Dutch Defence, in the Encyclopaedia of Chess Openings
