= B97 =

B97 may refer to:

- WEZB, an American radio station currently licensed to New Orleans, Louisiana
- WBFB, an American radio station licensed to Bangor, Maine formerly branded B97
- WBVB, an American radio station currently licensed to Coal Grove, Ohio
- Bundesstraße 97, a German road
- Murauer Straße, an Austrian road
- Sicilian Defence, Najdorf Variation, according to the list of chess openings
- B97, a postcode district in the B postcode area
