= Oakland, Rhode Island =

Coordinates: 41°57′26″N 71°38′52″W

- Oakland Historic District
- U.S. National Register of Historic Places
- U.S. Historic district
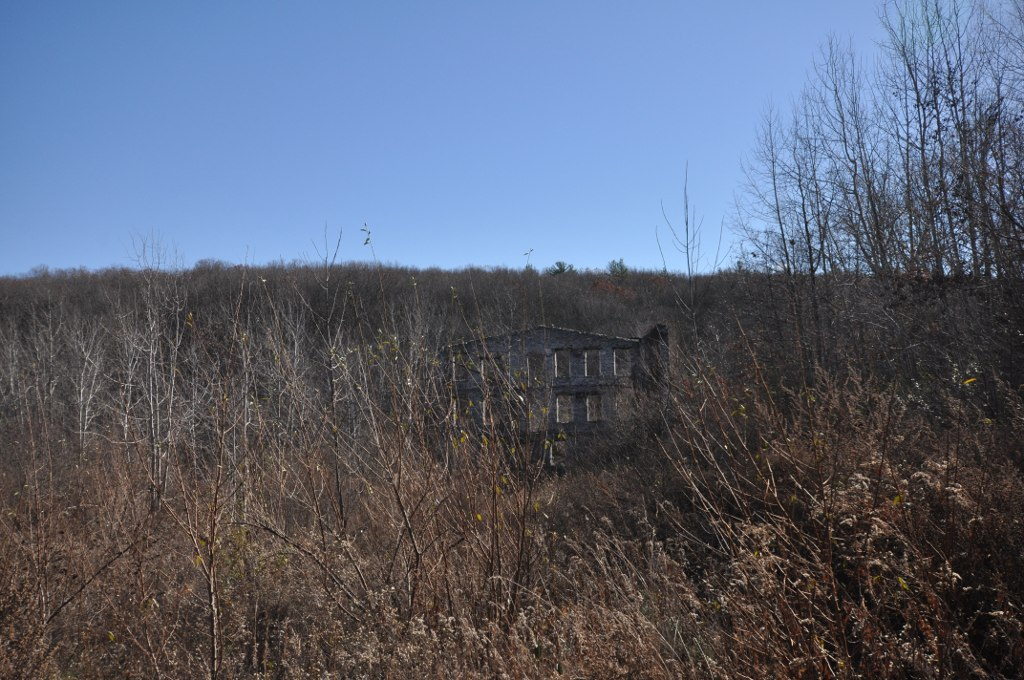
- What's left of the mill in Oakland

- Location within Rhode Island Location within the United States
- Location: Burrillville, Rhode Island
- Architect: Multiple
- Architectural style: Colonial Revival, Queen Anne, Shingle Style
- NRHP reference No.: 87001359
- Added to NRHP: September 9, 1987

Oakland is a village in Burrillville, Rhode Island. It was developed in the 19th century at the site of a stone mill near the confluence of the Chepachet and Clear Rivers. It is one of the few remaining stone mills in this state (now only in fragmentary ruins). Most of the village is included in the Oakland Historic District, listed on the National Register of Historic Places. Most of the housing in the village was built for mill workers, although there are several more elaborate homes built for mill executives.

== Demographics ==
Oakland is a small community in the northwest corner of Rhode Island with many woodland areas and rivers. The town relies on volunteer firefighters. Each day a whistle sounds at 5 p.m. from the Oakland-Mapleville Fire Department, as well as whenever fire personnel are needed. Many historic mills are scattered throughout the town, as well as mill-style neighborhoods.

== See also ==
- National Register of Historic Places listings in Providence County, Rhode Island
