= Route 96 (Rhode Island–Massachusetts) =

Highway in Rhode Island and Massachusetts

Route 96
- Route 96 highlighted in red

Route information
- Maintained by RIDOT and MassDOT
- Length: 7.06 mi (11.36 km) RI 96: 3.80 mi; MA 96: 3.26 mi

Major junctions
- South end: Route 98 in Burrillville, RI
- North end: Route 16 in Douglas, MA

Location
- Country: United States
- State: Rhode Island
- Counties: Providence (Rhode Island); Worcester (Massachusetts)

Highway system
- Rhode Island Routes
- Massachusetts State Highway System; Interstate; US; State
← I-95E	RI	→ Route 98
← I-95	MA	→ Route 97

Route 96 is a 7.06-mile-long (11.36 km) numbered state highway in the U.S. states of Rhode Island and Massachusetts.

== Route description ==
Route 96 starts in the village of Harrisville with its southern terminus with Route 98. Route 96 starts as Callahan School Street heading due west until it reaches Hill Road and branches off north as Round Top Road. From then it heads northwesterly towards the Massachusetts border and the town of Douglas. Once Route 96 reaches Massachusetts, it is turned into MA Route 96 as South Street. After Route 96 branches off north, the only roads it intersects with are Smith Road, West Road, and Brook Road; all within the town limits of Burrillville. After the state line, it runs 3.26 miles (5.25 km) to the northwest, and ends at an intersection with Route 16.

Route 96 is 3.8 miles (6.1 km) in length in Rhode Island, and 3.26 miles (5.25 km) in Massachusetts.

== Major intersections ==
State	County	Location	mi	km	Destinations	Notes
Rhode Island	Providence	Burrillville	0.00	0.00	Route 98 (Sherman Farm Road) to Route 107	Southern terminus
Rhode Island–Massachusetts state line			3.80 0.00	6.12 0.00	Route transition	
Massachusetts	Worcester	Douglas	3.26	5.25	Route 16 – Webster, Dudley, East Douglas, Uxbridge	Northern terminus
1.000 mi = 1.609 km; 1.000 km = 0.621 mi: Route transition
