= N98 =

N98 may refer to:

- Boyne City Municipal Airport, in Michigan, United States
- HMS Turbulent (N98), a submarine of the Royal Navy
- London Buses route N98
- Nebraska Highway 98, in the United States
- Route nationale 98, in France
