= 1928 United States presidential election in Rhode Island =

- November 6, 1928

Nominee	Al Smith	Herbert Hoover
Party	Democratic	Republican
Home state	New York	California
Running mate	Joseph Taylor Robinson	Charles Curtis
Electoral vote	5	0
Popular vote	118,973	117,522
Percentage	50.16%	49.55%

Smith
50–60%
60–70%
Hoover
50–60%
60–70%
70–80%
80–90%
President before election
Calvin Coolidge
Republican
Elected President
Herbert Hoover
Republican

The 1928 United States presidential election in Rhode Island took place on November 6, 1928, as part of the 1928 United States presidential election which was held throughout all contemporary 48 states. Voters chose five representatives, or electors to the Electoral College, who voted for president and vice president.

Rhode Island voted for the Democratic nominee, Governor Alfred E. Smith of New York, over the Republican nominee, former Secretary of Commerce Herbert Hoover of California. Smith's running mate was Senator Joseph Taylor Robinson of Arkansas, while Hoover's running mate was Senate Majority Leader Charles Curtis of Kansas.

Smith won Rhode Island by a very narrow margin of 0.61%, making him the first Democratic presidential candidate since Woodrow Wilson in 1912 to carry the state, as well as the first to win an absolute majority of the vote since Franklin Pierce in 1852. Although Hoover won more counties than Smith, key to Smith's victory was his appeal to "ethnic white" Roman Catholic voters in Providence County and Bristol County. Rhode Island was the only state save adjacent Massachusetts (another state with a large Catholic population) outside the Democratic "Solid South" that voted for Smith in 1928. This was the second of three times that the state voted differently than Minnesota, along with 1912 and 1984.

Despite winning in a landslide nationally, Hoover became the first Republican to ever win the presidency without carrying Rhode Island. Given the scale of Hoover's win, Rhode Island weighed in as 18 percentage points more Democratic than the United States at large. Hoover also became the first Republican to ever win without carrying Providence and Bristol counties. Beginning in 1928, Rhode Island would transition from a strongly Yankee Republican state into a Democratic-leaning state. Since then, Republicans have only carried the state four times, all in Republican landslide years: 1952, 1956, 1972, and 1984.

== Results ==
1928 United States presidential election in Rhode Island
Party	Candidate	Running mate	Popular vote		Electoral vote	
Party	Candidate	Running mate	Count	%	Count	%
Democratic	Al Smith of New York	Joseph Taylor Robinson of Arkansas	118,973	50.16%	5	100.00%
Republican	Herbert Hoover of California	Charles Curtis of Kansas	117,522	49.55%	0	0.00%
Socialist Labor	Verne L. Reynolds of Michigan	Jeremiah D. Crowley of New York	416	0.18%	0	0.00%
Communist	William Z. Foster of Massachusetts	Benjamin Gitlow of New York	283	0.12%	0	0.00%
Total			237,194	100.00%	5	100.00%

=== By county ===
1928 United States presidential election in Rhode Island (by county)
County	Al Smith Democratic		Herbert Hoover Republican		Other candidates Various parties		Margin		Total
County	%	#	%	#	%	#	%	#	#
Bristol	51.8%	4,080	48.0%	3,780	0.2%	13	300	3.8%	7,873
Kent	39.3%	7,460	60.4%	11,487	0.3%	58	-4,027	-21.1%	19,005
Newport	43.9%	6,748	55.8%	8,578	0.2%	33	-1,830	-11.9%	15,359
Providence	52.9%	97,185	46.8%	85,884	0.3%	568	11,301	6.1%	183,637
Washington	30.9%	3,500	68.8%	7,793	0.2%	27	-4,293	-37.9%	11,320

== See also ==
- United States presidential elections in Rhode Island
