= Pascoag Grammar School =

- U.S. National Register of Historic Places
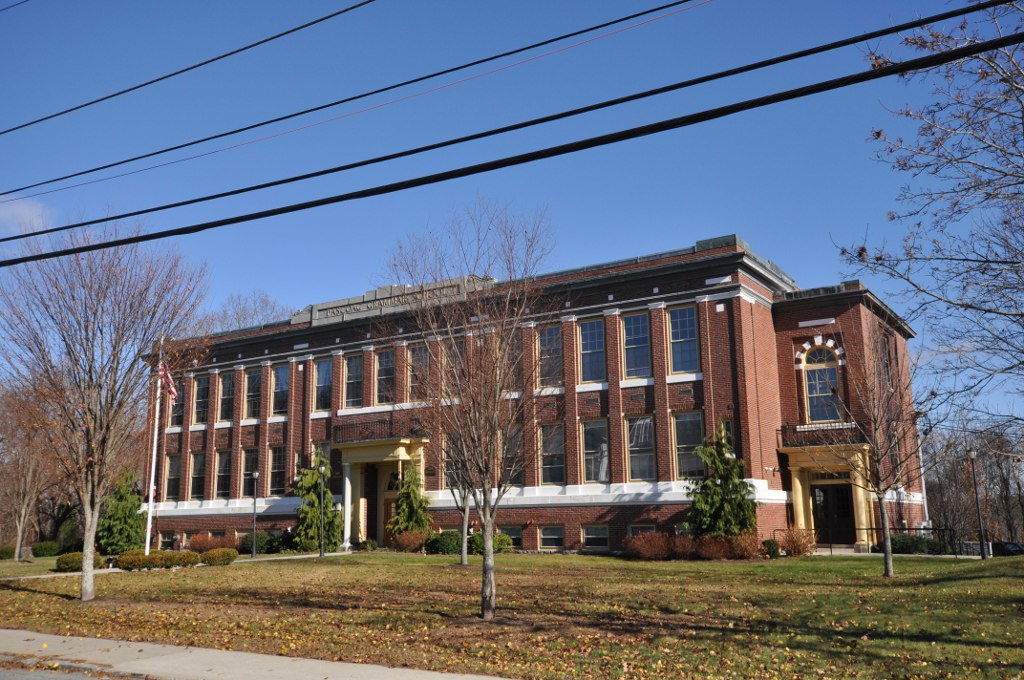

- Location within Rhode Island Location within the United States
- Location: Burrillville, Rhode Island
- Coordinates: 41.96266°N 71.70476°W
- Area: 1.4 acres (0.57 ha)
- Built: 1917
- Architect: McLaughlin, Thomas S.; Mahoney & Coffey
- Architectural style: Colonial Revival
- NRHP reference No.: 06001062
- Added to NRHP: November 21, 2006

The Pascoag Grammar School, formerly known as Burrillville High School, is a historic school building at 265 Sayles Avenue in the Pascoag village of Burrillville, Rhode Island. The Colonial Revival-style school was built in 1917 by Thomas McLaughlin and Mahoney & Coffey to replace a school that had burned down. It is a T-shaped brick structure 2 1/2 stories high, with 15 bays across its main facade and a raised center entrance. It initially served as the town's high school, but a new high school was constructed in 1936, and this building was used strictly as an elementary school until it was closed in 1995. It sat vacant until 2005, when it was acquired by a developer and rehabilitated.

The building was added to the National Register of Historic Places in 2006. In 2007, it was converted into condominiums.

== See also ==
- National Register of Historic Places listings in Providence County, Rhode Island
