= Woonsocket and Pascoag Railroad =

Map

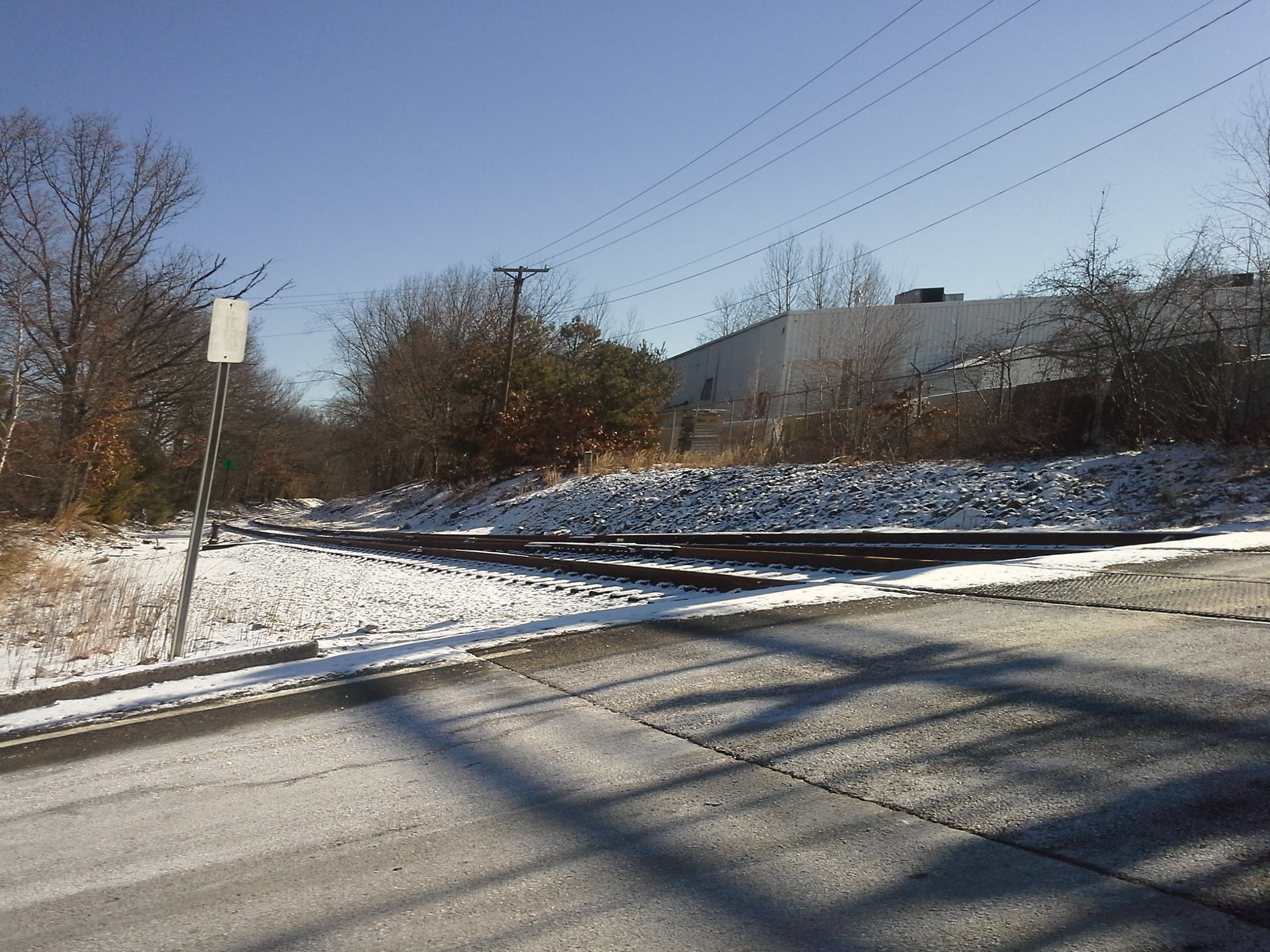
Old Woonsocket and Pascoag Railroad tracks now owned by the Providence & Worcester Railroad in Slatersville near the modern-day terminus

The Woonsocket and Pascoag Railroad was a historic railroad that operated between Woonsocket, Rhode Island and Pascoag, Rhode Island. Its remaining tracks from Woonsocket to Slatersville are now owned and operated by the Providence and Worcester Railroad.

The Woonsocket and Pascoag Railroad was likely founded and constructed in 1891 and was later officially acquired by the New York and New England Railroad. According to author Frank Heppner, "the line beyond Slatersville to Pascoag was abandoned in the 1930s, but against all probability, the line between Woonsocket and Slatersville survives today as a freight branch of the Providence and Worcester Railroad that primarily serves a single customer, a steel supplier called Denman and Davis" in North Smithfield, a company which is now part of O’Neal Steel, Inc...
