= Harrisville, Rhode Island =

Census-designated place in Rhode Island, United States

- Census-designated place
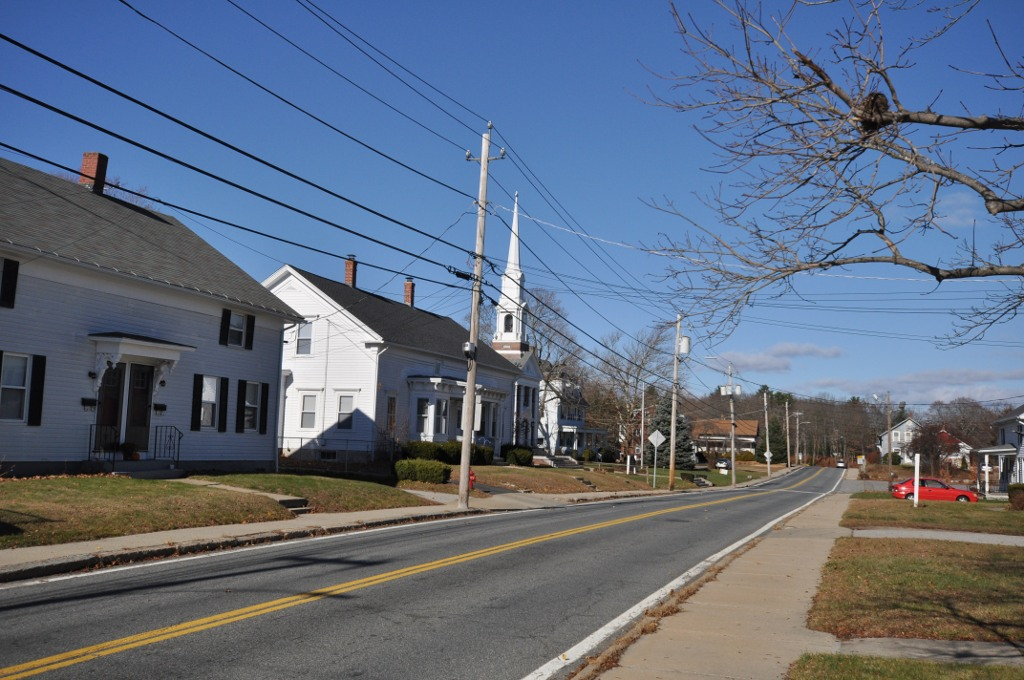
- RI Route 98

- Location in Providence County and the state of Rhode Island.
- Coordinates: 41°58′7″N 71°40′48″W
- Country: United States
- State: Rhode Island
- County: Providence

Area
  - Total: 0.86 sq mi (2.22 km^{2})
  - Land: 0.81 sq mi (2.10 km^{2})
  - Water: 0.042 sq mi (0.11 km^{2})
- Elevation: 325 ft (99 m)

Population (2020)
  - Total: 1,745
  - Density: 2,148.6/sq mi (829.57/km^{2})
- Time zone: UTC-5 (Eastern (EST))
  - Summer (DST): UTC-4 (EDT)
- ZIP code: 02830
- Area code: 401
- FIPS code: 44-33400
- GNIS feature ID: 1218783

- Harrisville Historic District
- U.S. National Register of Historic Places
- U.S. Historic district
- Location within Rhode Island Location within the United States
- Location: Burrillville, Rhode Island
- Coordinates: 41°57′59″N 71°40′33″W
- Architectural style: American Colonial, Federal, Victorian
- NRHP reference No.: 84002010
- Added to NRHP: March 21, 1984

Harrisville is a census-designated place (CDP) and village in the town of Burrillville, Rhode Island. As of the 2020 census, Harrisville had a population of 1,745. Much of the community composes a historic district listed on the National Register of Historic Places. The village was named after nineteenth century manufacturer Andrew Harris. It was previously named Rhodesville, after eighteenth-century privateer Captain William Rhodes.

== Geography ==
Harrisville is located at 41°58′7″N 71°40′48″W (41.968481, -71.680011).

According to the United States Census Bureau, the CDP has a total area of 2.2 km^{2} (0.9 mi^{2}), of which 2.1 km^{2} (0.8 mi^{2}) is land and 0.1 km^{2} (0.04 mi^{2}) (3.53%) is water.

== Demographics ==
Historical population
Census	Pop.	Note	%±
2020	1,745		—
U.S. Decennial Census

=== 2020 census ===
The 2020 United States census counted 1,745 people, 799 households, and 268 families in Harrisville. The population density was 2,149.0 per square mile (829.7/km^{2}). There were 837 housing units at an average density of 1,030.8 per square mile (398.0/km^{2}). The racial makeup was 92.15% (1,608) white or European American (91.06% non-Hispanic white), 0.46% (8) black or African-American, 0.29% (5) Native American or Alaska Native, 0.52% (9) Asian, 0.06% (1) Pacific Islander or Native Hawaiian, 1.26% (22) from other races, and 5.27% (92) from two or more races. Hispanic or Latino of any race was 3.61% (63) of the population.

Of the 799 households, 24.2% had children under the age of 18; 37.4% were married couples living together; 38.3% had a female householder with no spouse or partner present. 39.3% of households consisted of individuals and 19.6% had someone living alone who was 65 years of age or older. The average household size was 1.9 and the average family size was 3.1. The percent of those with a bachelor's degree or higher was estimated to be 13.5% of the population.

19.4% of the population was under the age of 18, 8.7% from 18 to 24, 22.5% from 25 to 44, 29.0% from 45 to 64, and 20.5% who were 65 years of age or older. The median age was 44.6 years. For every 100 females, the population had 122.3 males. For every 100 females ages 18 and older, there were 126.2 males.

The 2016–2020 5-year American Community Survey estimates show that the median household income was $43,333 (with a margin of error of +/- $26,352) and the median family income was $112,909 (+/- $39,560). Males had a median income of $52,705 (+/- $44,530) versus $46,902 (+/- $15,635) for females. The median income for those above 16 years old was $47,391 (+/- $16,973). Approximately, 3.7% of families and 9.9% of the population were below the poverty line, including 4.1% of those under the age of 18 and 20.9% of those ages 65 or over.

=== 2000 census ===
At the 2000 census there were 1,561 people, 655 households, and 417 families in the CDP. The population density was 744.1/km^{2} (1,923.5/mi^{2}). There were 677 housing units at an average density of 322.7/km^{2} (834.2/mi^{2}). The racial makeup of the CDP was 98.72% White, 0.13% African American, 0.13% Native American, 0.06% Asian, 0.51% from other races, and 0.45% from two or more races. Hispanic or Latino of any race were 0.19%.

Of the 655 households 33.0% had children under the age of 18 living with them, 47.3% were married couples living together, 12.4% had a female householder with no husband present, and 36.3% were non-families. 32.2% of households were one person and 17.3% were one person aged 65 or older. The average household size was 2.38 and the average family size was 3.04.

The age distribution was 25.4% under the age of 18, 8.1% from 18 to 24, 31.5% from 25 to 44, 20.5% from 45 to 64, and 14.5% 65 or older. The median age was 37 years. For every 100 females, there were 84.7 males. For every 100 females age 18 and over, there were 79.6 males.

The median household income was $40,430 and the median family income was $51,141. Males had a median income of $41,731 versus $26,420 for females. The per capita income for the CDP was $21,969. About 9.7% of families and 13.9% of the population were below the poverty line, including 26.6% of those under age 18 and 14.5% of those age 65 or over.

== See also ==
- National Register of Historic Places listings in Providence County, Rhode Island
