= Pascoag, Rhode Island =

Census-designated place in Rhode Island, United States

- Census-designated place
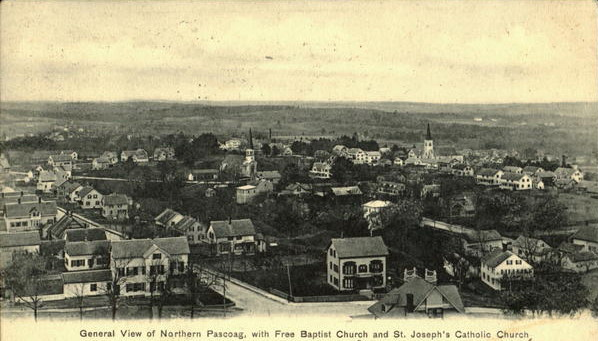
- Pascoag c. 1900

- Location in Providence County, Rhode Island
- Coordinates: 41°57′27″N 71°42′21″W
- Country: United States
- State: Rhode Island
- County: Providence

Area
  - Total: 5.56 sq mi (14.41 km^{2})
  - Land: 5.07 sq mi (13.13 km^{2})
  - Water: 0.49 sq mi (1.28 km^{2})
- Elevation: 430 ft (130 m)

Population (2020)
  - Total: 4,641
  - Density: 915.5/sq mi (353.48/km^{2})
- Time zone: UTC-5 (Eastern (EST))
  - Summer (DST): UTC-4 (EDT)
- ZIP code: 02859
- Area code: 401
- FIPS code: 44-54460
- GNIS feature ID: 1218912

Pascoag (PASS-ko or PASS-kog) is a census-designated place (CDP) and village in Providence County, Rhode Island, United States. As of the 2020 census, Pascoag had a population of 4,641. Pascoag is one of eight villages that make up the town of Burrillville.

== Geography ==
Pascoag is located at 41°57′27″N 71°42′21″W (41.957401, -71.705957). The village is centered on the Pascoag River at its outlet from the Pascoag Reservoir. The river drops 60 feet (18 m) through the village, providing ample power for industry in the village's early days. According to the United States Census Bureau, the village has a total area of 5.5 square miles; 5 square miles is land and 0.4 square miles (7.88%) is water.

== Demographics ==
Historical population
Census	Pop.	Note	%±
2020	4,641		—
U.S. Decennial Census

=== 2020 census ===
As of the 2020 census, Pascoag had a population of 4,641, with 1,811 households and 1,189 families. The median age was 40.7 years. 22.3% of residents were under age 18, 7.2% were age 18 to 24, 25.9% were age 25 to 44, 27.1% were age 45 to 64, and 17.6% were age 65 or older. For every 100 females, there were 95.5 males, and for every 100 females age 18 and over, there were 92.4 males age 18 and over.

84.7% of residents lived in urban areas, while 15.3% lived in rural areas.

Of the 1,811 households, 34.6% had children under the age of 18. Of all households, 46.4% were married-couple households, 18.4% were households with a male householder and no spouse or partner present, and 24.8% were households with a female householder and no spouse or partner present. About 24.0% of all households were made up of individuals, and 10.4% had someone living alone who was 65 years of age or older.

There were 1,978 housing units, of which 8.4% were vacant. The homeowner vacancy rate was 0.8% and the rental vacancy rate was 2.1%. The population density was 915.6 per square mile (353.5/km^{2}), and housing density was 390.2 per square mile (150.7/km^{2}).

Racial composition as of the 2020 census
Race	Number	Percent
White	4,305	92.8%
Black or African American	32	0.7%
American Indian and Alaska Native	14	0.3%
Asian	18	0.4%
Native Hawaiian and Other Pacific Islander	3	0.1%
Some other race	60	1.3%
Two or more races	209	4.5%
Hispanic or Latino (of any race)	178	3.8%

Non-Hispanic White residents made up 91.4% of the population.

=== Households and housing estimates ===
The average household size was 2.6 and the average family size was 3.0.

=== Education ===
The percent of those with a bachelor’s degree or higher was estimated to be 18.6% of the population.

=== Income and poverty ===
The 2016–2020 5-year American Community Survey estimates show that the median household income was $86,741 (with a margin of error of +/- $14,413) and the median family income was $89,398 (+/- $23,198). Males had a median income of $55,735 (+/- $16,984) versus $32,155 (+/- $12,092) for females. The median income for those above 16 years old was $45,846 (+/- $8,341). Approximately, 6.1% of families and 7.0% of the population were below the poverty line, including 7.8% of those under the age of 18 and 13.8% of those ages 65 or over.

=== 2000 census ===
As of the census of 2000, there were 4,742 people, 1,642 households, and 1,175 families residing in the village. The racial makeup was 98.33% White, 0.36% African American, 0.32% American Indian, 0.27% Asian, 0.02% Pacific Islander, 0.17% from other races, and 0.53% from two or more races. Hispanic or Latino of any race were 1.03% of the population. The population was spread out, with 26.5% under the age of 18, 7.4% from 18 to 24, 31.0% from 25 to 44, 19.7% from 45 to 64, and 15.4% who were 65 years of age or older. The median age was 37 years. The median income for a household was $48,778, and the median income for a family was $54,391.

== History ==
The name of Burrillville's principal village, Pascoag, named after the Pascoag River upon which it is located, probably derives from an Algonquian Indian root. The Nipmuc word for snake was rendered "askug" by Roger Williams in his A Key Into the Language of America, and "askoog" by the Reverend John Eliot in his Algonquian translation of the Bible.

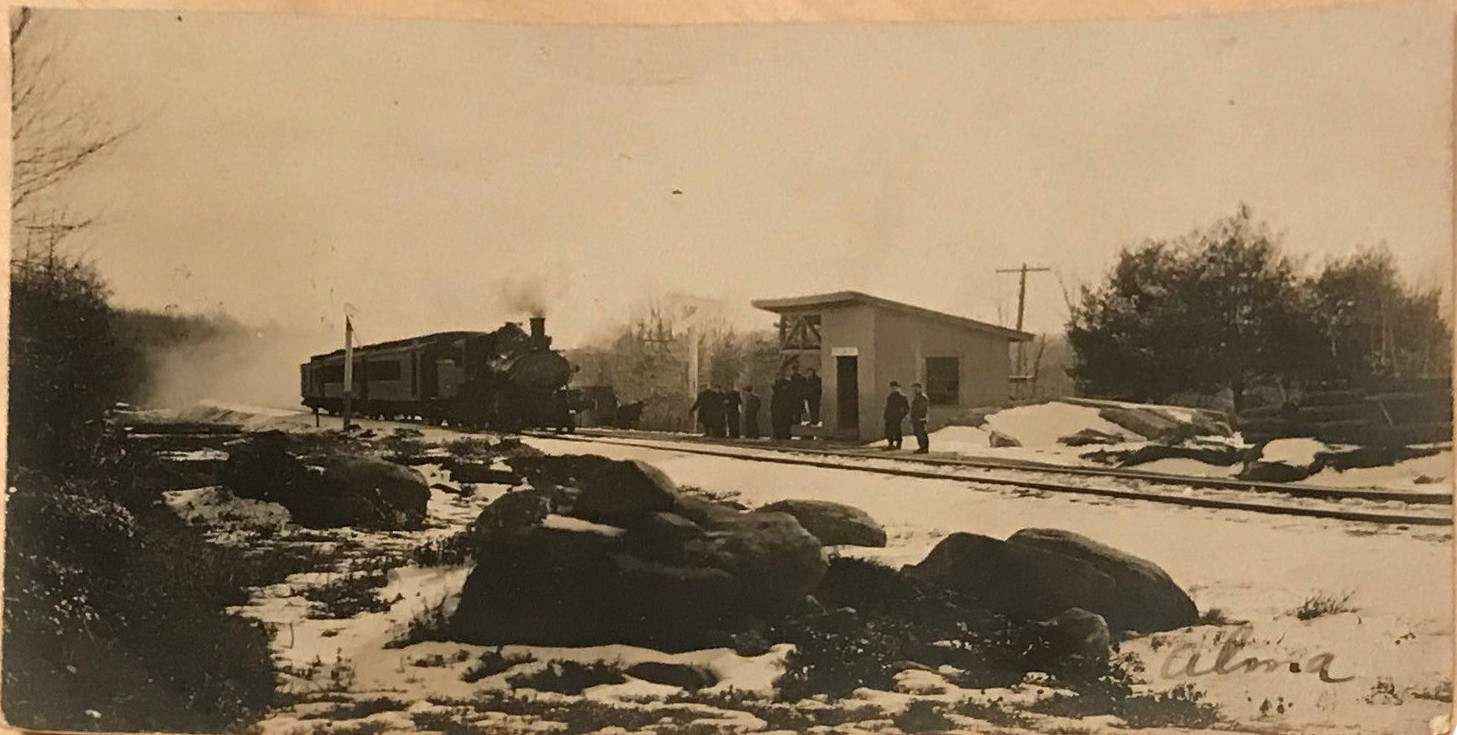
Wallum Lake station in Pascoag in 1909

Pascoag can trace its origins back to the first half of the 18th century, when a saw mill and other businesses were built in what is now the village center. In the 19th century, Pascoag became a textile manufacturing town, an industry that continued until after World War II. From 1891 until the 1930s the Woonsocket and Pascoag Railroad operated trains to Pascoag, but the line (currently operated by the Providence & Worcester Railroad) now terminates in Slatersville.

The horror author HP Lovecraft set part of his story "The Horror at Red Hook" (1925) in Pascoag.

Recent history includes an incident involving groundwater contamination. A test of the groundwater conducted on September 14, 2001, showed that the water contained the ether MTBE (methyl tertiary-butyl ether) at levels of over 350 ppb (parts per billion). This was the first public statement concerning the presence of MTBE in Pascoag drinking water, though residents claim to have detected it as early as May 2001. MTBE is a gasoline additive intended to enhance octane levels. It is believed to have come from leaking tanks at a local ExxonMobil gas station. As the situation was resolved over the following months, nearly 1,500 residents of Pascoag responded by filing a lawsuit against ExxonMobil through the law offices of Napoli, Kaiser, and Bern and Houston attorney Armistead Easterby. ExxonMobil signed off on a $7 million settlement with residents of Pascoag in May 2012, to cover the cost of having the Pascoag Public Utility District bore new wells.

== Historic sites ==
- Pascoag Grammar School (1917)
