= Burrillville, Rhode Island =

Town in Rhode Island

- Town
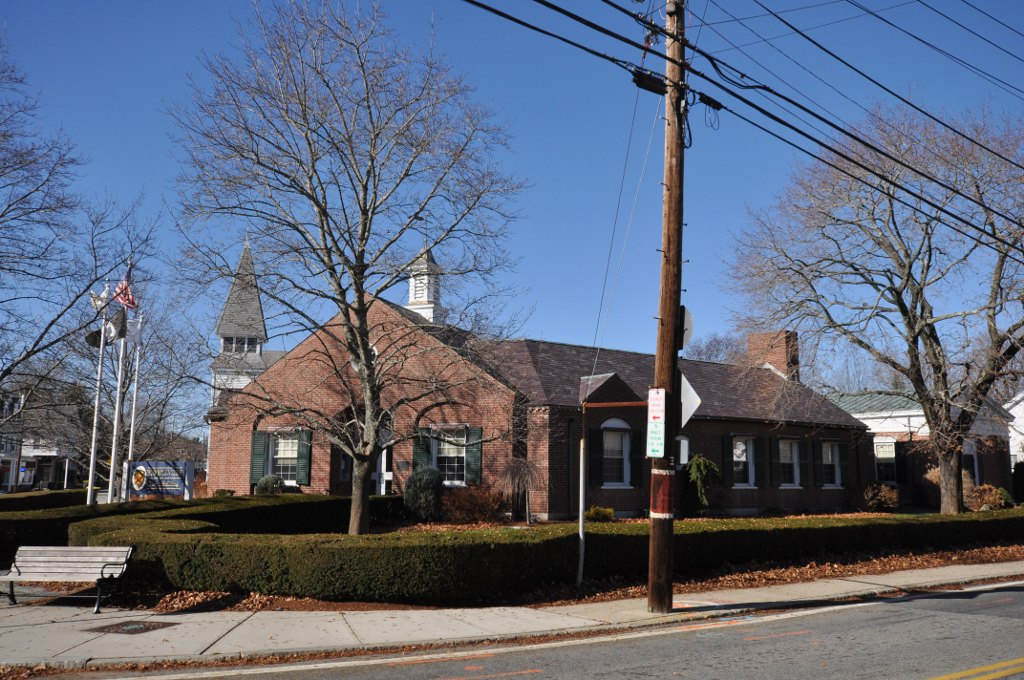
- Town office building (2013)

- Coat of arms
- Motto: "Embracing Our Past...Envisioning Our Future"
- Location within Providence County and Rhode Island.

- Location in the United States
- Coordinates: 41°58′6″N 71°40′59″W
- Country: United States
- State: Rhode Island
- County: Providence
- Incorporated: 1806
- Named for: James Burrill Jr.

Government
  - Type: Council–Manager
  - Town Manager: Michael C. Wood

Area
  - Total: 57.1 sq mi (148.0 km^{2})
  - Land: 55.6 sq mi (143.9 km^{2})
  - Water: 1.6 sq mi (4.1 km^{2})
- Elevation: 371 ft (113 m)

Population (2020)
  - Total: 16,158
  - Density: 290.8/sq mi (112.3/km^{2})
- Time zone: UTC−5 (EST)
  - Summer (DST): UTC−4 (EDT)
- ZIP Codes: 02826 (Glendale), 02830 (Harrisville), 02839 (Mapleville), 02858 (Oakland), 02859 (Pascoag)
- Area code: 401
- FIPS code: 44-11800
- GNIS ID: 1220081
- Website: burrillville.org

Burrillville (Note: /ˈbʌrɛvɪl/ BUH-rev-il, locally /ˈbɜːrvɪl/ BUR-vil) is a town in Providence County, Rhode Island. The population was 16,158 at the 2020 census.

== History ==
Burrillville was settled around 1662 by English colonists as part of Glocester, Rhode Island. John Smith and members of the Saulsbury family were among the earliest settlers. Samuel Willard treated many smallpox victims in South Uxbridge and Glocester (Burrillville). In 1806, Burrillville became a separate town and consisted of 60 square miles (160 km^{2}) of land in the northwestern corner of Rhode Island, bordering Connecticut and Massachusetts. Boundary disputes with Massachusetts and Glocester reduced this land area by the mid-19th century. Joktan Putnam was the first town moderator.

The various mills and villages took shape in the 19th century, such as Harris mills and the village of Harrisville, Mapleville mills, and Oakland mills. The town is today part of the Blackstone River Valley National Heritage Corridor, New England's historic National Park area.

Burrillville was incorporated as an independent municipality on November 17, 1806, when the Rhode Island General Assembly authorized the residents of North Glocester to elect their own officers. The town was named for Senator James Burrill Jr., who was the Rhode Island Attorney General.

== Geography ==
According to the United States Census Bureau, the town has a total area of 57.2 square miles (148.0 km^{2}), of which 55.6 square miles (143.9 km^{2}) is land and 1.6 square miles (4.1 km^{2}) (2.76%) is water.

=== Villages ===
Burrillville is further divided into villages: Glendale, Harrisville, Mapleville, Nasonville, Oakland, and Pascoag.

=== Climate ===
Climate data for Burrillville, Rhode Island
Month	Jan	Feb	Mar	Apr	May	Jun	Jul	Aug	Sep	Oct	Nov	Dec	Year
Record high °F (°C)	67 (19)	68 (20)	88 (31)	94 (34)	93 (34)	94 (34)	97 (36)	97 (36)	94 (34)	84 (29)	78 (26)	75 (24)	97 (36)
Mean daily maximum °F (°C)	35 (2)	38 (3)	47 (8)	58 (14)	69 (21)	76 (24)	81 (27)	79 (26)	72 (22)	61 (16)	50 (10)	39 (4)	59 (15)
Mean daily minimum °F (°C)	16 (−9)	19 (−7)	27 (−3)	36 (2)	46 (8)	55 (13)	60 (16)	59 (15)	51 (11)	39 (4)	32 (0)	22 (−6)	39 (4)
Record low °F (°C)	−13 (−25)	−11 (−24)	−1 (−18)	14 (−10)	27 (−3)	38 (3)	42 (6)	39 (4)	31 (−1)	21 (−6)	4 (−16)	−15 (−26)	−15 (−26)
Average precipitation inches (mm)	4.97 (126)	4.00 (102)	5.09 (129)	4.49 (114)	4.00 (102)	4.04 (103)	3.84 (98)	4.51 (115)	3.99 (101)	4.61 (117)	4.97 (126)	4.66 (118)	53.17 (1,351)
Average snowfall inches (cm)	11.5 (29)	10 (25)	2.1 (5.3)	0.9 (2.3)	0 (0)	0 (0)	0 (0)	0 (0)	0 (0)	0.2 (0.51)	2 (5.1)	10.7 (27)	37.4 (94.21)

== Demographics ==
Historical population
Census	Pop.	Note	%±
1810	1,834		—
1820	2,164		18.0%
1830	2,196		1.5%
1840	1,982		−9.7%
1850	3,538		78.5%
1860	4,140		17.0%
1870	4,674		12.9%
1880	5,714		22.3%
1890	5,492		−3.9%
1900	6,317		15.0%
1910	7,878		24.7%
1920	8,696		10.4%
1930	7,677		−11.7%
1940	8,185		6.6%
1950	8,774		7.2%
1960	9,119		3.9%
1970	10,087		10.6%
1980	13,164		30.5%
1990	16,230		23.3%
2000	15,796		−2.7%
2010	15,955		1.0%
2020	16,158		1.3%
U.S. Decennial Census

As of the census of 2020, there were 16,158 people and 6,029 households in the town. The population density was 294.2 inhabitants per square mile (113.6/km^{2}). There were 6,701 housing units in the town. The racial makeup of the town was 92.75% White, 0.65% African American, 0.15% Native American, 0.49% Asian, 0.05% Pacific Islander, 1.22% from other races, and 4.70% from two or more races. Hispanic or Latino of any race were 3.43% of the population.

There were 6,029 households, out of which 26.4% had children under the age of 18 living with them, 55.6% were married couples living together, 22.2% had a female householder with no spouse present, and 15.2% had a male householder with no spouse present. Of all households, 8.6% were made up of individuals, and 3.3% had someone living alone who was 65 years of age or older. The average household size was 2.63 and the average family size was 3.04.

In the town, the population was spread out, with 18.7% under the age of 18, 8.6% from 18 to 24, 23.2% from 25 to 44, 30.2% from 45 to 64, and 19.3% who were 65 years of age or older. The median age was 44 years.

The median income for a household in the town was $111,829, and the median income for a family was $129,363. The per capita income for the town was $46,197. About 6.9% of the population was below the poverty line, including 8.8% of those under age 18 and 6.1% of those age 65 or over.

== Government ==
Burrillville town vote by party in presidential elections
Year	GOP	DEM	Others
2024	61.65% 5,378	36.20% 3,158	2.15% 188
2020	57.46% 4,906	40.22% 3,434	2.32% 198
2016	56.93% 4,139	35.19% 2,558	7.88% 573
2012	44.19% 3,044	53.22% 3,666	2.60% 179
2008	44.79% 3,160	52.87% 3,730	2.34% 165
2004	47.61% 3,024	50.45% 3,204	1.94% 123
2000	37.96% 2,228	54.70% 3,211	7.34% 431
1996	26.25% 1,420	54.90% 2,970	18.85% 1,020
1992	29.32% 1,880	38.27% 2,454	32.41% 2,078
1988	47.85% 2,479	51.75% 2,681	0.41% 21

In the Rhode Island Senate, Burrillville is a part of the 23rd District and is currently represented by Republican Jessica De La Cruz. At the federal level in the U.S. House of Representatives, Burrillville is in Rhode Island's 2nd congressional district, which is currently represented by Democrat Seth M. Magaziner.

In presidential elections, Burrillville has traditionally leaned Democratic; however, in 2016, Donald Trump became the first Republican to win the town in over three decades when he defeated former U.S. Secretary of State Hillary Clinton by approximately 22 points. This was the best Republican performance since 1920.

Burrillville was also one of seven towns in Rhode Island where independent candidate Ross Perot finished in second place during the 1992 presidential election. Perot received 2,018 votes (31.47 percent) behind Bill Clinton's 2,454 votes (38.27 percent) and ahead of George H. W. Bush's 1,880 (29.32 percent).

== Notable people ==
- Vice Admiral Walter E. Carter Jr., naval flight officer and President of the U.S. Naval War College
- Oscar Lapham, U.S. Congressman
- Henry Francis Walling, cartographer

== National Historic Register sites ==
- Bridgeton School (1897)
- Harrisville Historic District
- Moses Taft House (Burrillville, Rhode Island) (1786)
- Oakland Historic District
- Pascoag Grammar School (1917)
