= Thomas Marriott James =

American architect (1875–1942)

Thomas M. James
- Born: May 18, 1875; Cambridge, Massachusetts
- Died: July 8, 1942 (aged 67); Cohasset, Massachusetts
- Occupation: Architect

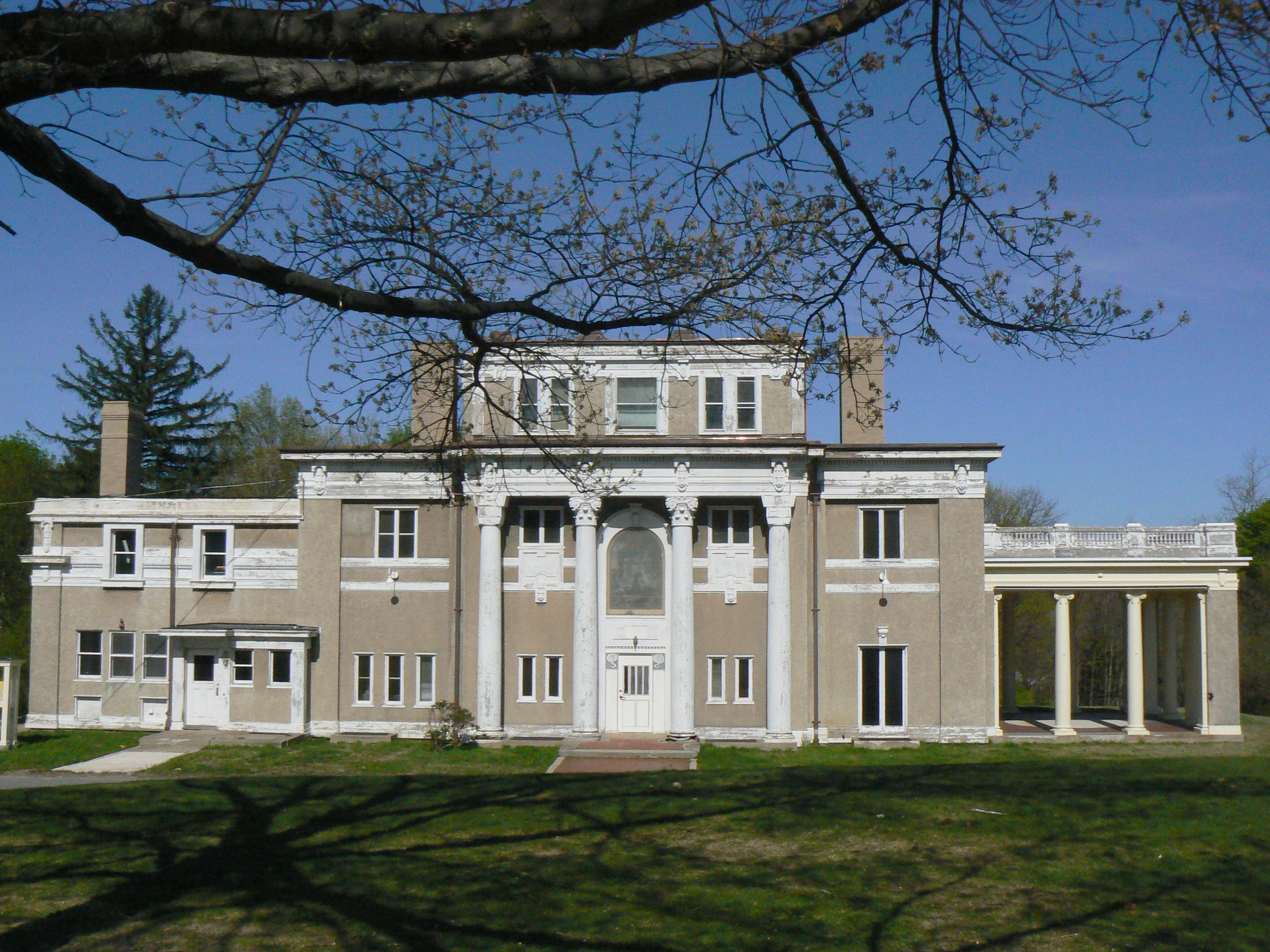
Aigremont in Winchester, designed by Hill & James in the Neoclassical style and completed in 1907.

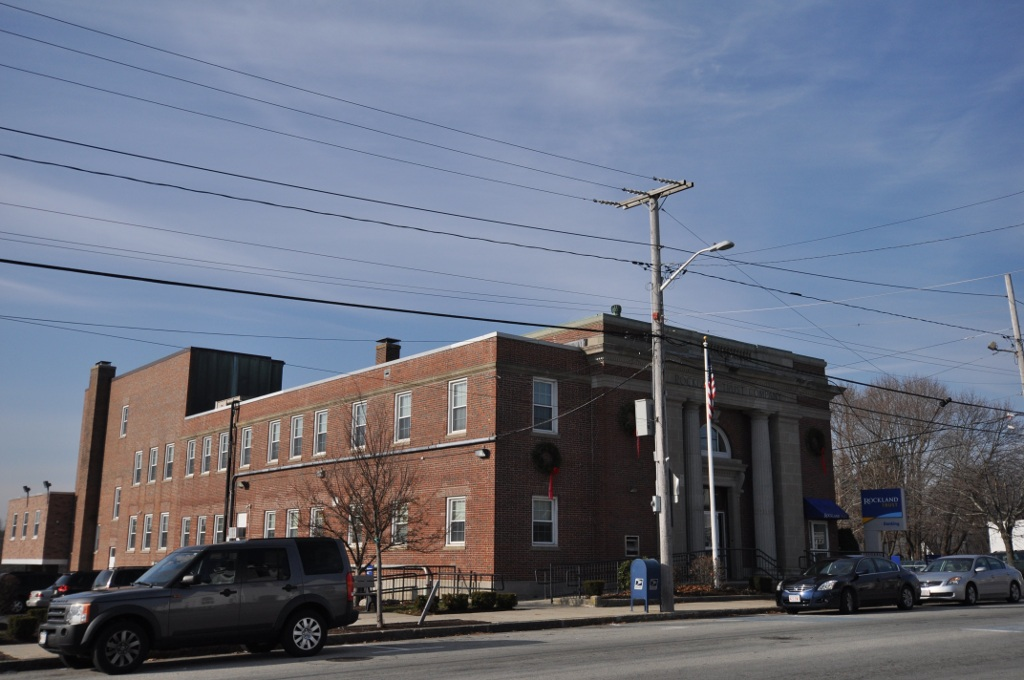
The Rockland Trust Company building, designed by James in the Colonial Revival style and completed in 1917.

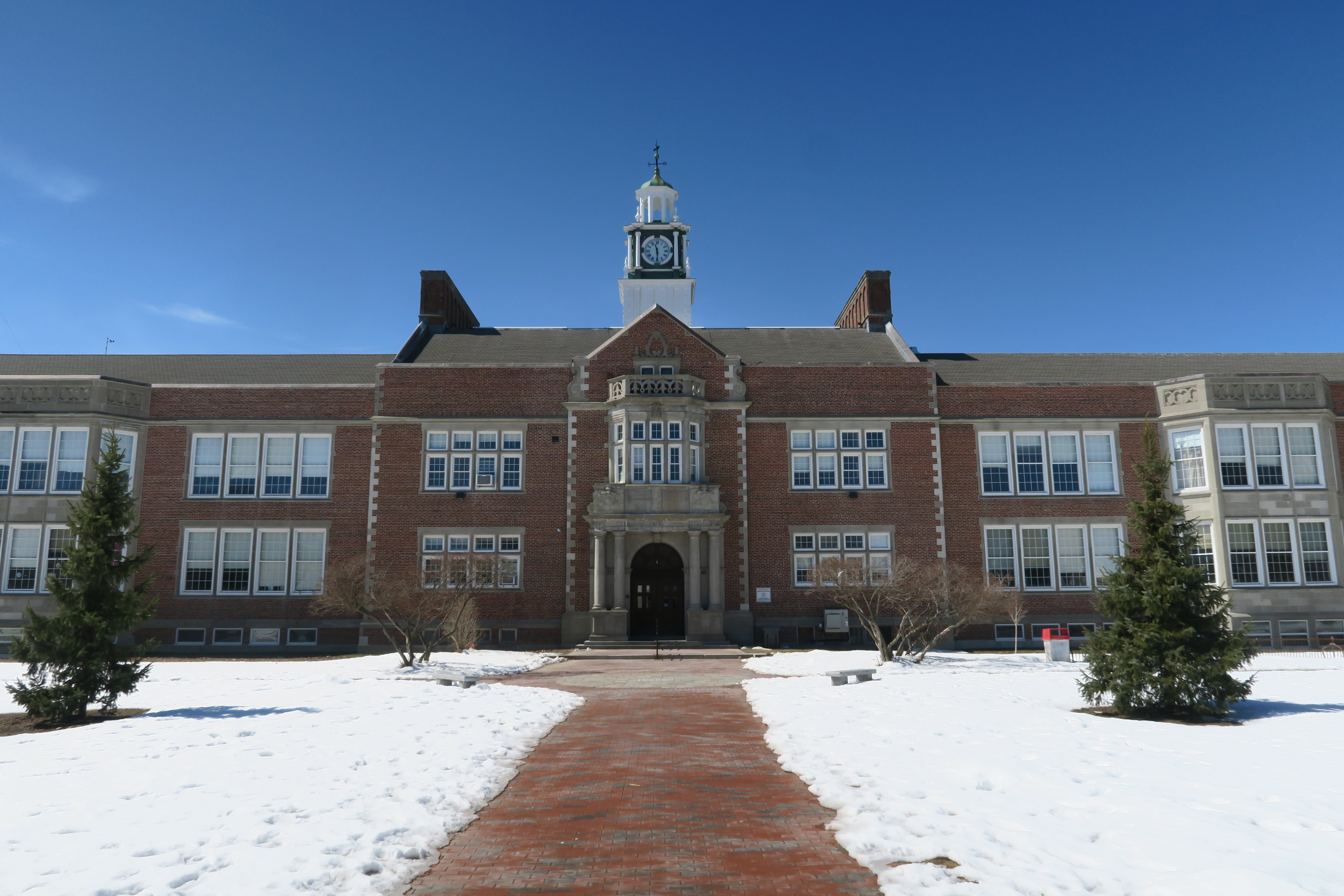
Deering High School in Portland, Maine, designed by Poor & Thomas with James in the Jacobethan style completed in 1923.

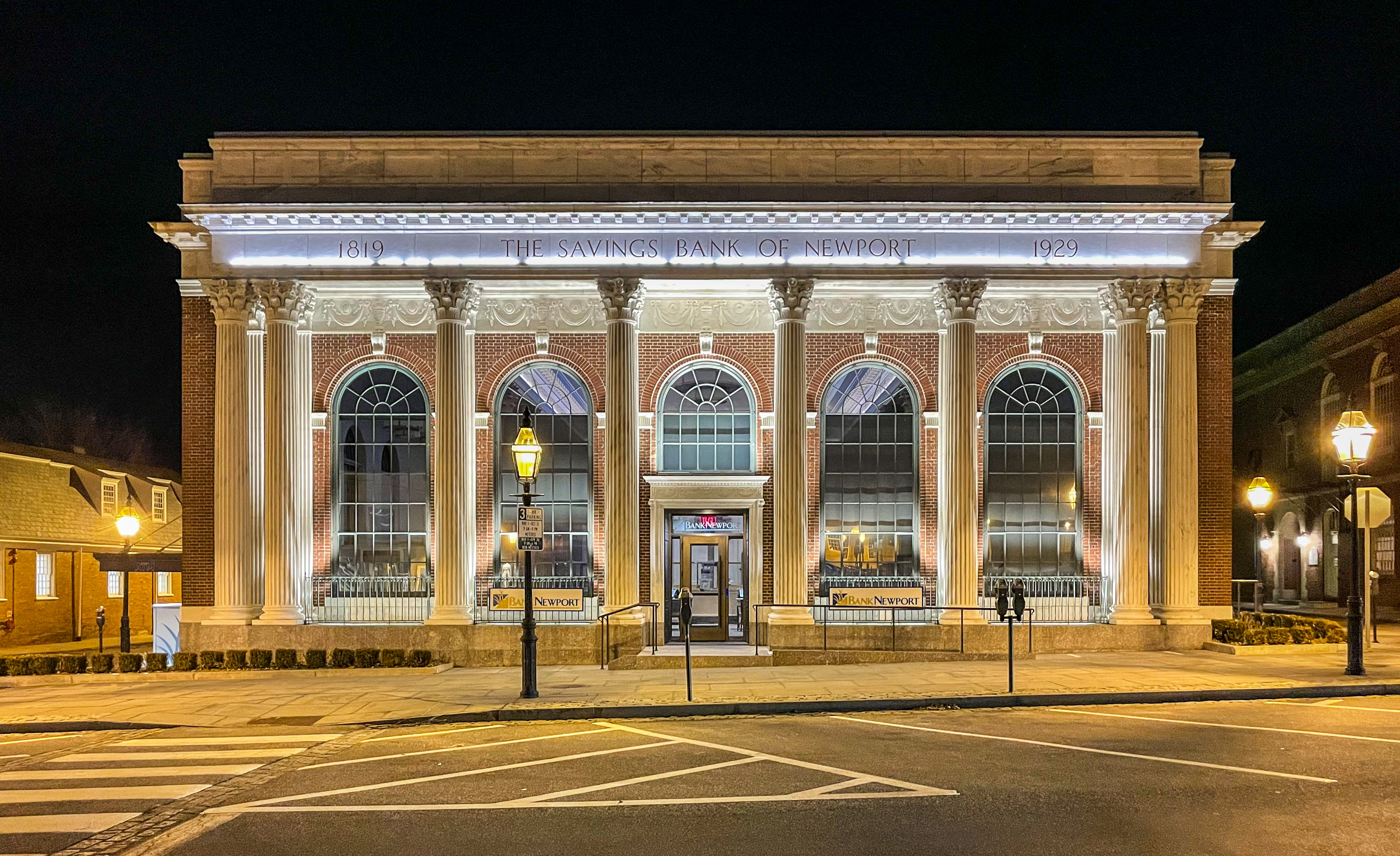
The Savings Bank of Newport building, designed by James in the Colonial Revival style and completed in 1930.

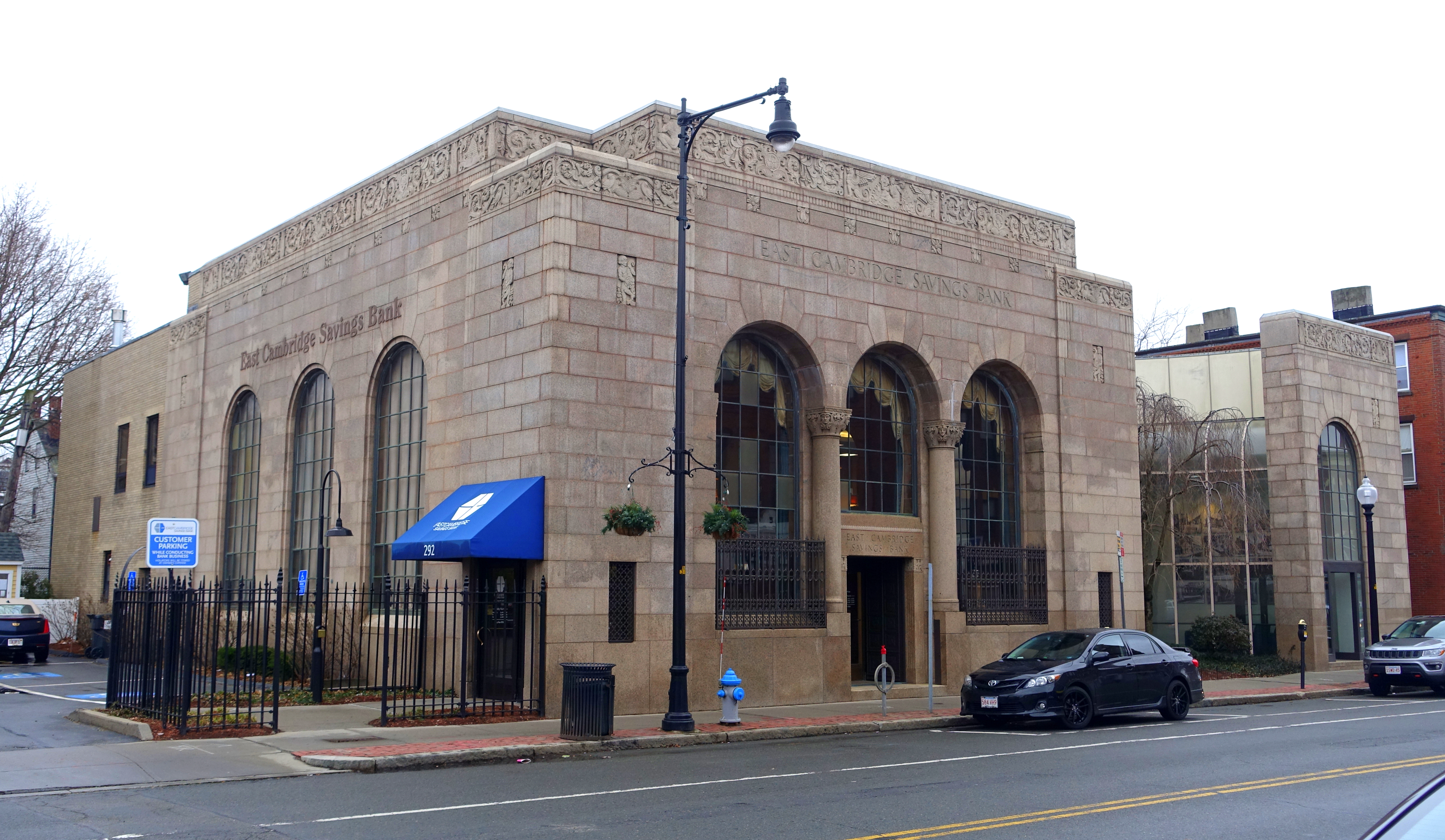
The East Cambridge Savings Bank, designed by James in the Spanish Renaissance style and completed in 1931.

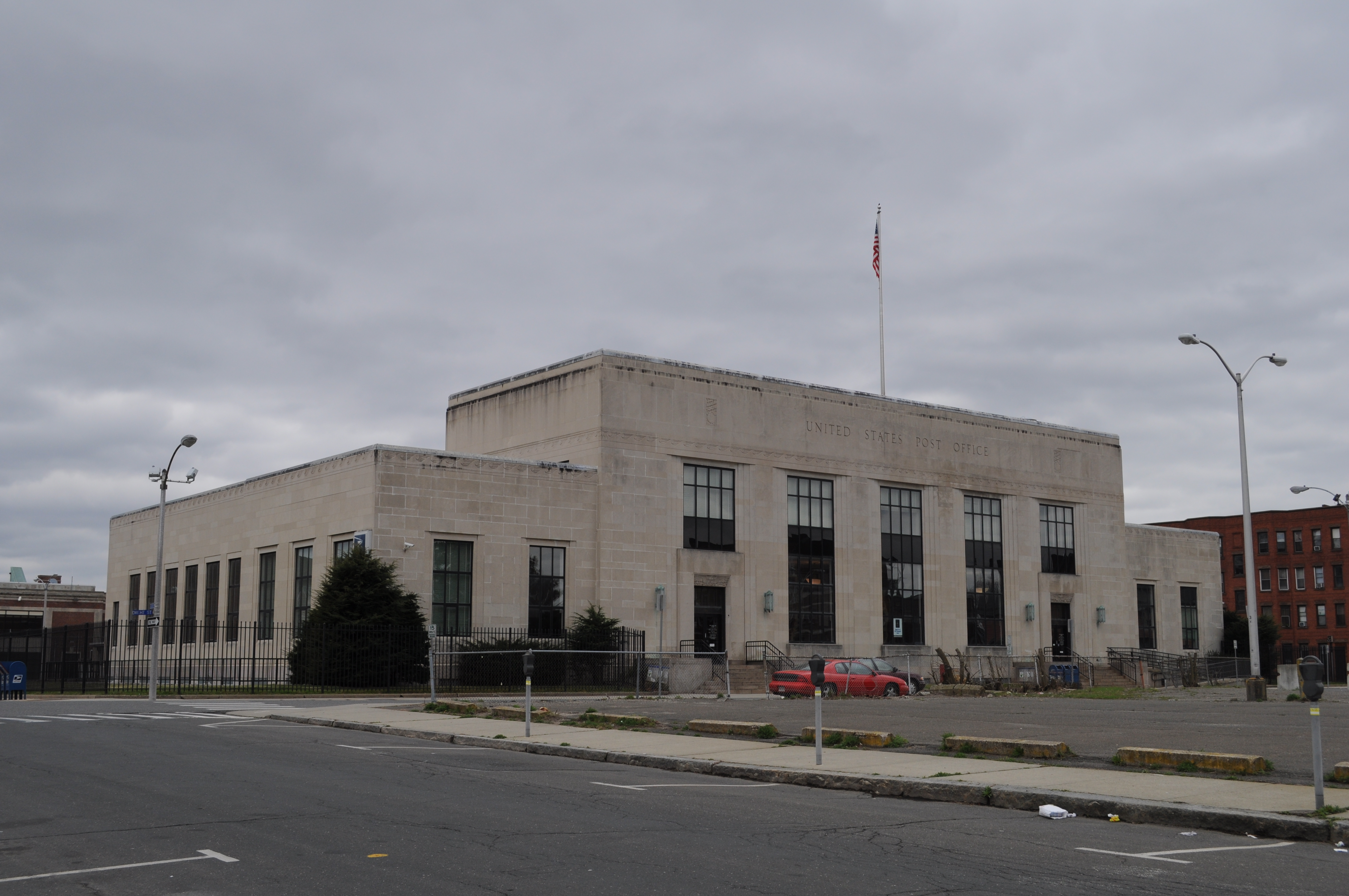
The United States Post Office in Holyoke, designed by James and George P. B. Alderman in the Art Deco style and completed in 1935.

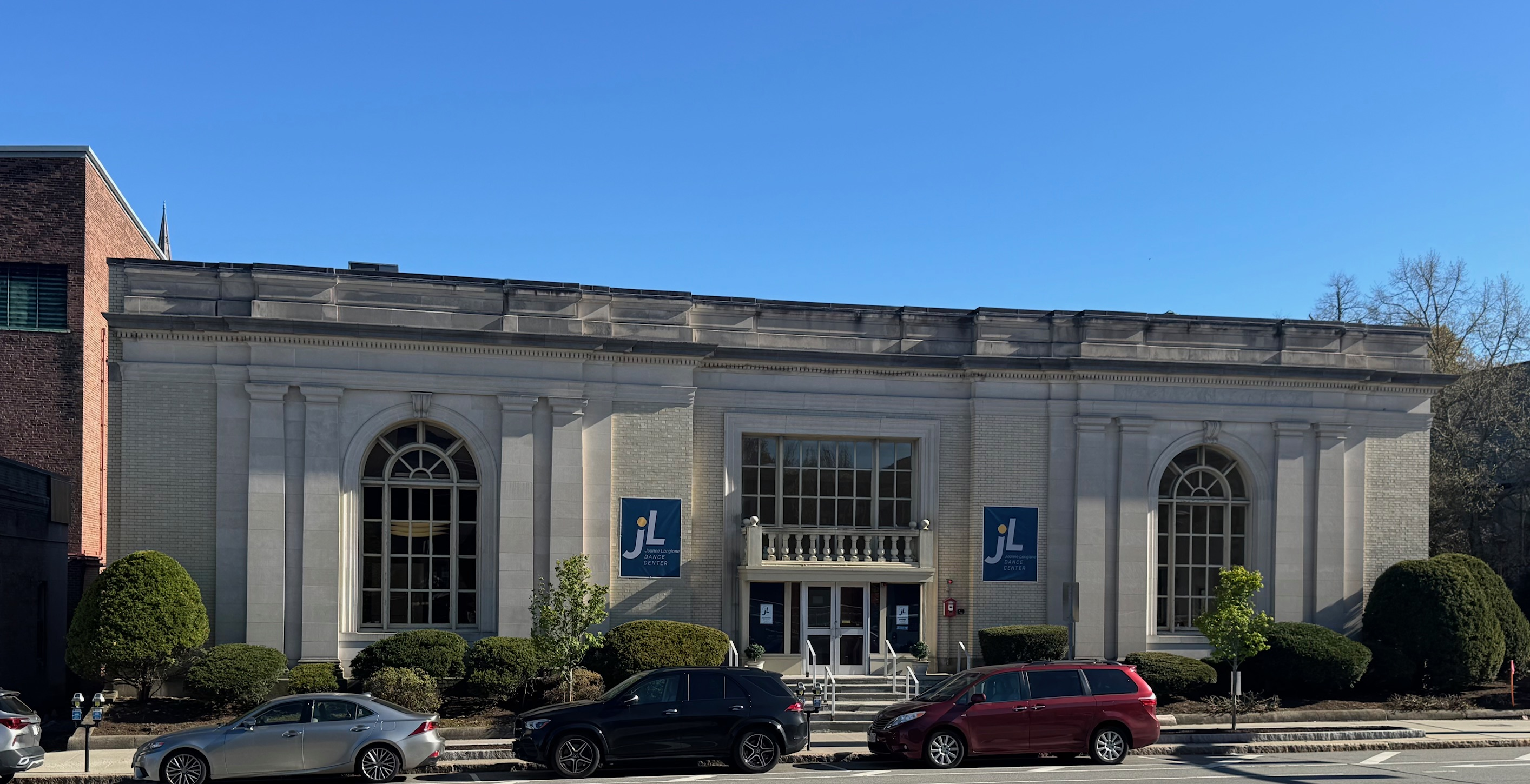
Designed by W.M. James and completed in 1915. Early example of fireproof constuction.

Thomas Marriott James AIA (May 18, 1875 – July 8, 1942) was an American architect, active in the Boston area, best known for his bank buildings in styles ranging from Neoclassical to Spanish Renaissance to Art Deco.

== Life and career ==
Thomas Marriott James was born May 18, 1875, in Cambridge to Joseph K. James, a soap manufacturer, and Elizabeth Troy James. He was not formally educated past grammar school, finishing at the Morse School in Somerville in 1890. He was trained in architecture in the office of Samuel J. Brown before joining that of Eugene L. Clark as a drafter. Both Brown and Clark had low-profile practices specializing in the design of single family homes. Brown's contemporary work includes the Adams Claflin House (1890). As a teenager employed by Clark, James was responsible for homes in Somerville for Mina J. Wendell (1893), principal of the Morse School, and for his parents (1894).

In 1897 he and his employer formed the partnership of Clark & James. In 1898 he opened his own office. In 1905 he formed a new partnership, Hill & James, with Clinton M. Hill. Circa 1908 they were joined by a third partner and the firm was briefly known as Hill, James & Whitaker. In 1909 Hill moved to New York City to join the firm of John Jardine, and James continued alone. For the first fifteen-odd years of his professional career, James had a general practice focusing on the design of homes and schools. After performing alterations for several banks, his first entirely new bank building was for the East Boston Savings Bank (1914), and by the time of World War I his practice was almost entirely focused on bank projects.

In 1920 he incorporated the Thomas M. James Company with offices in Boston, Springfield and Cleveland. Within a year a fourth office was opened in New York City. The Springfield and Cleveland offices soon closed but the New York City office was maintained until the start of the Great Depression. James retired from practice about the beginning of World War II, and the firm was continued by partners William H. Jones and Frank H. Colony Jr. until the latter's death in 1973.

== Personal life ==
James was married in 1897 in Everett to Ruth Lyra Dodge. They lived in Boston and Sherborn before settling in Cohasset. He was a member of the American Institute of Architects, the Boston Society of Architects, the Algonquin Club and the Boston Athletic Association and was a parishioner of St. Stephen's Episcopal Church in Cohasset. He died July 8, 1942, in Cohasset at the age of 67.

== Architectural works ==
- 1894 – Joseph K. James House, 83 Belmont St, Somerville, Massachusetts
  - NRHP-listed
- 1907 – Oren C. Sanborn house, Aigremont, 15 High St, Winchester, Massachusetts
  - NRHP-listed
- 1909 – Joseph Remick House, 4 Swan Rd, Winchester, Massachusetts
  - NRHP-listed
- 1910 – Shubert Theatre, 263-265 Tremont St, Boston
  - NRHP-listed
- 1910 – United Electric Co. Building, 73 State St, Springfield, Massachusetts
  - NRHP-listed, but substantially demolished to build MGM Springfield
- 1911 – Guy P. Gannett House, 184 State St, Augusta, Maine
  - NRHP-listed
- 1914 – East Boston Savings Bank building, 10 Meridian St, East Boston, Boston
- 1915 - West Newton Savings Bank, 1314 Washington Street. Included in West Newton Village Center NR Historic District.
- 1916 – Eliot Savings Bank Building, 165 Dudley St, Roxbury, Boston
- 1917 – Rockland Trust Company building, 288 Union St, Rockland, Massachusetts
  - NRHP-listed
- 1920 – Warren Institution for Savings Building, 3 Park St, Boston
- 1922 – National Bank of Commerce building, 250 State St, New London, Connecticut
  - A contributing resource to the NRHP-listed Downtown New London Historic District
- 1922 – Seymour Trust Company building, 115 Main St, Seymour, Connecticuthttps://www.stcroixarchitecture.com/products/seymour-trust-company-seymour-ct-1924-lithograph-thomas-m-james-co
  - A contributing resource to the NRHP-listed Downtown Seymour Historic District
- 1923 – Deering High School, 370 Stevens Ave, Portland, Maine
  - Designed by Poor & Thomas, architects, with the Thomas M. James Company, consulting architects.
- 1924 – Atlantic National Bank Building, 10 Post Office Sq, Boston
- 1926 – Woonsocket Institution for Savings building, 144 Main St, Woonsocket, Rhode Island
  - A contributing resource to the NRHP-listed Main Street Historic District
- 1927 – Old Colony Cooperative Bank building, 58 Weybosset St, Providence, Rhode Island
  - A contributing resource to the NRHP-listed Downtown Providence Historic District
- 1927 – Stafford Savings Bank building, 2 Furnace Ave, Stafford Springs, Connecticut
- 1929 – Rhode Island Hospital Trust Company building, 162 Main St, Woonsocket, Rhode Island
  - A contributing resource to the NRHP-listed Main Street Historic District
- 1929 – Second National Bank Building, 75 Federal Street, Boston
- 1930 – Savings Bank of Newport building, 10 Washington Sq, Newport, Rhode Island
- 1931 – East Cambridge Savings Bank building, 292 Cambridge St, Cambridge, Massachusetts
  - NRHP-listed
- 1931 – Lynn Bank Block addition, 21–29 Exchange St, Lynn, Massachusetts
  - NRHP-listed
- 1933 – Springfield Safe Deposit and Trust Company building, 127-131 State St, Springfield, Massachusetts
- 1934 – Safety Fund National Bank building alterations, 470 Main St, Fitchburg, Massachusetts
  - NRHP-listed.
- 1935 – Arlington Cooperative Bank Building, 699 Massachusetts Ave, Arlington, Massachusetts
- 1935 – United States Post Office, 650 Dwight St, Holyoke, Massachusetts
  - Designed by the Thomas M. James Company and George P. B. Alderman, associated architects. NRHP-listed
