= Avidia Bank =

Bank headquartered in Hudson, Massachusetts

- Type: Stock
- Industry: Financial services
- Predecessor: Hudson Savings Bank and Westborough Bank
- Founded: 2007; 19 years ago
- Headquarters: Hudson, Massachusetts, United States
- Products: Banking services
- Parent: Avidia Bancorp, Inc.
- Website: www.avidiabank.com

Avidia Bank is a Massachusetts-chartered stock savings bank headquartered in Hudson, Massachusetts. It was founded in 2007 when it was formed by a merger between Hudson Savings Bank and Westborough Bank.

== History ==
Avidia Bank was formed as a result of a merger between Hudson Savings Bank and Westborough Bank. This merger arose from an agreement between Assabet Valley Bancorp, the parent of Hudson Savings Bank, and Westborough Financial Services Inc., the owner of Westborough Bank.

The agreement stated that all employees would retain employment, the mutual holding company Westborough Financial Services Inc. would be eliminated, and there would be a complete name change of the newly established financial institution. It was also decided that the bank would be headquartered in Hudson, MA.

During mid-2019, Avidia Bank underwent a rebranding that involved updating its logo, adopting new color schemes, and introducing the tagline, "Honest to Goodness TM." As part of the rebranding campaign, the bank launched two commercials featuring new characters, one with a duration of 40 seconds and 20 seconds.

Avidia announced that former Rockland Trust executive, Robert Cozzone, would succeed Mark R. O'Connell as President and CEO.

== Community partnerships ==
Avidia Bank founded the Avidia Charitable Foundation in July 1997 with the aim of providing support to non-profit organizations. The foundation's focus extends to a range of sectors, including healthcare, education, legal aid, baseball, and human services. Notable beneficiaries of the foundation's philanthropic efforts include the River's Edge Arts Alliance and UMass Memorial Health Care.

In August 2019, Avidia Bank partnered with Stephon Gilmore on the "Be a Champion for a Child" initiative. Through this partnership, the bank awarded two tickets to each home game to a mentor and mentee from the Boys and Girls Clubs of MetroWest. Additionally, during the 2019 NFL season, Avidia Bank committed to donating $1,000 to the Boys and Girls Clubs of MetroWest for every turnover made by the New England Patriots in their regular-season games, with a maximum total donation of $30,000.

In October 2019, Avidia Bank announced a partnership with Brad Marchand called "Assists for Kids". This initiative aimed to support local children in MetroWest Massachusetts by providing them with hockey safety equipment and contributing $150 to their youth savings accounts, thereby assisting them in affording participation in hockey. For each assist made during the regular season, Avidia Bank pledged a donation of $25, with a maximum donation cap of $30,000.

In May 2024, Avidia Bank announced a partnership with the Worcester Bravehearts to promote local businesses in Worcester, MA.

== Recognition ==
Avidia Bank was named to American Banker's list of Top 10 Community Bank IT Projects of 2015 for their implementation of "Cardless Cash"; the ability to quickly and securely withdraw money at an ATM using a smartphone.

Avidia Bank was named the 2017 Digital Edge 50 Award for its successful promotion of the "Cardless Cash" initiative. The bank gained recognition for effectively utilizing brand advocacy with employees, known as the Avidia Smarties.

In 2019, Avidia Bank was honored with recognition in the FIS Innovation Awards for its innovative use of FIS APIs and the NYCE payment network. Through its solution, Instant Merchant Settlement, Avidia Bank has successfully expedited the settlement of payments for merchant processors, resulting in improved liquidity for its merchant customers and creating a new revenue stream for the bank.

Avidia Bank was recognized by The Boston Globe as a Top Place to Work for 2023 and 2024.

== In the news ==
In February 2025, Avidia received critisim for an event scheduled in their Hudson MA Community Room. The Hudson Town Republican Committee was scheduled to host meeting with two participants in the January 6th United States Capitol Attack (known as J6ers). The bank was the subject of online threats from customers to close their accounts and community members who planned to stage a protest. The event was eventually called off by the organizers after the bank's involvement sparked anger.
