= 101 Federal Street =

Coordinates: 42.355°N 71.0569°W

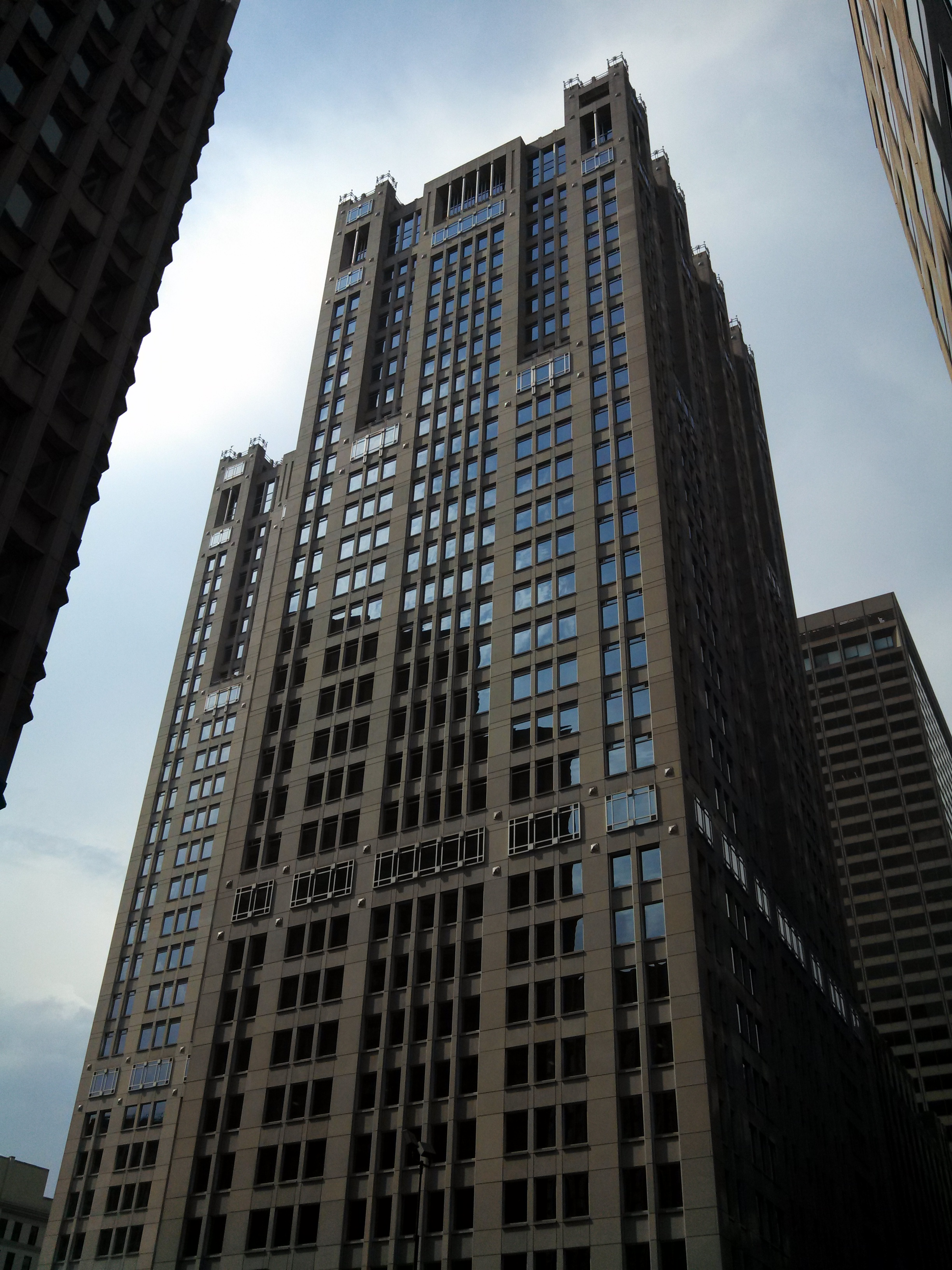
- View from the street
- Interactive map of the 101 Federal Street area
- Alternative names: 75–101 Federal Street

General information
- Status: Completed
- Type: Skyscraper
- Architectural style: Postmodernism
- Location: 101 Federal Street, Boston, Massachusetts, United States
- Current tenants: Wipro
- Completed: 1988
- Owner: Transwestern

Height
- Height: 116 meter (381 ft)

Technical details
- Structural system: Steel
- Material: Limestone
- Floor count: 31
- Floor area: 800,000 sq ft (74,000 m^{2})
- Lifts/elevators: 8

Design and construction
- Architecture firm: Kohn Pedersen Fox Associates
- Engineer: Lev Zetlin & Associates
- Main contractor: Morse Diesel

101 Federal Street is a skyscraper on Federal Street in the Financial District neighborhood of Boston, Massachusetts. Completed in 1988, the 116 meter (381 ft) building was designed by Kohn Pedersen Fox Associates PC. The building is also known as 75–101 Federal Street These buildings contain 800,000 sq ft (74,000 m^{2}) of office space.

== History ==
The State Street Trust Building is the 75 Federal Street portion of the building. The Art Deco building was designed by Thomas M. James in 1929. In the late 1980s, the Boston Redevelopment Authority allowed for the elimination of smaller narrow streets to create larger building parcels. This is how an L-shaped parcel was created to make room for 101 Federal Street.

== Architectural details ==
101 Federal is three crenellated shafts joined to 75 Federal Street on the first eleven floors. The limestone facade takes into account the coloring of the older 75 Federal St.

The exterior surfaces of the 21-story building at 75 Federal consists of low relief figurative and floral bands on street level floors. The exterior also features bronze panel sculptures depicting finance, architecture and sculpture, agriculture, power and transportation. The interior features an art deco inspired lobby features black and buff terrazzo floors inset with marble, dark green and richly veined red marble walls and piers and ornate bronze decorations. The original lobby has elevator doors that match the marble coloring. The elevator control panels and signs are in the Broadway engraved style.

The exterior of the 31 story building at 101 Federal features masonry construction clad with smooth Indiana limestone panels. The surfaces have 101 Federal has raised circles and brushed aluminum. The lobby features floors of black and dark red terrazzo, with zinc and brass dividers and marble inlays. 101 Federal features wood elevators.

== Building design team ==
- Architect: Kohn Pedersen Fox, New York, New York
- General Contractor: Morse Diesel, International, Boston, MA
- Owner: Transwestern
- Engineer: Lev Zetlin & Associates
- Lobby Terrazzo Contractor: DePaoli Mosaic, Boston, MA
- Steel Contractor: Cives Steel Company, Roswell GA
- Indiana Limestone supplier: Evans Limestone Bedford, IN
- Indiana Limestone Contractor: Moliterno Stone Sales, Inc.

== Tenants ==
- Wipro
