= Blue Hills Bank =

American bank

Blue Hills Bancorp, Inc.
- Company type: Public
- Traded as: NYSE: BHBK; Russell 2000 Component
- Industry: Banking
- Predecessor: Hyde Park Savings Bank
- Founded: 1871; 155 years ago
- Headquarters: Norwood, Massachusetts
- Key people: William M. Parent (President & CEO); James E. Kivlehan (CFO)
- Revenue: ▲$0.080 billion (2016)
- Net income: ▲$0.008 billion (2016)
- Total assets: ▲$2.469 billion (2016)
- Total equity: ▼$0.386 billion (2016)
- Number of employees: 228
- Website: www.bluehillsbank.com

Blue Hills Bank was a bank based in Hyde Park, Massachusetts. The bank was named Hyde Park Savings Bank until 2011. The bank had 11 branches, all of were are in Massachusetts.

== History ==
Hyde Park Savings Bank was organized on April 20, 1871 and incorporated on March 8, 1871. Charles F. Gerry was its first president. It opened for business on June 17, 1871. It was originally located in the selectmen's room of the Hyde Park town hall. On September 1, 1871 it moved to Hyde Park's Neponset Block, where it remained until the building was destroyed by fire on May 5, 1874. The bank relocated temporarily to the town office building in the Everett Block. A new bank building was constructed in 1875. In 1899, the bank moved to a new building in Everett Square.

The Panic of 1873 and the Long Depression led the Massachusetts State Bank Commission to place the bank under the restrictions of the "Stay Law of 1878", which allowed the commissioners to limit the time and amount of payments to depositors whenever they deemed it necessary. On June 15, 1880, the bank was allowed to resume normal business.

In November 2011, the bank changed its name to Blue Hills Bank and made management changes as part of its effort to expand its consumer business and launch a commercial banking line.

In December 2013, the bank secured the naming rights to the Blue Hills Bank Pavilion, an outdoor music venue on the Boston waterfront.

On January 18, 2014, the bank acquired Nantucket Bank's 3 branches from Sovereign Bank.

On July 21, 2014, the bank became a public company via an initial public offering.

In 2016, the bank opened a branch in downtown Boston.

In September 2018, Blue Hills Bancorp, Inc. announced that it intended to be acquired in 2019 by Rockland Trust. Blue Hills Bank accounts were transferred to Rockland Trust on June 10, 2019.
