= Leader Bank Pavilion =

Amphitheater in Boston, Massachusetts

Coordinates: 42°20′55″N 71°02′10″W

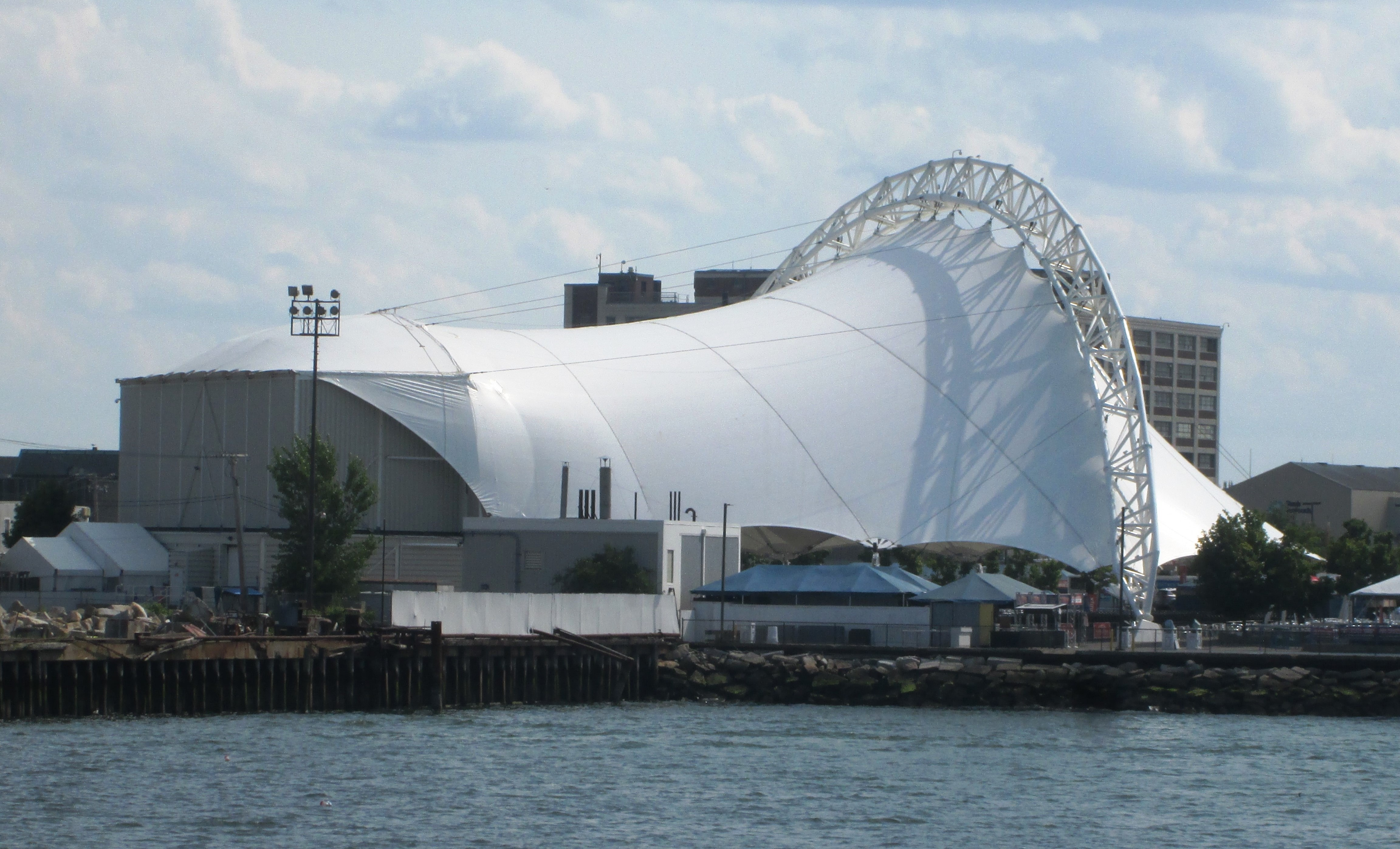
- from Boston Harbor (2017)
- Interactive map of Leader Bank Pavilion
- Full name: Leader Bank Pavilion
- Former names: Harbor Lights Pavilion (1994–98); BankBoston Pavilion (1999); FleetBoston Pavilion (2000–04); Bank of America Pavilion (2004–13); Blue Hills Bank Pavilion (2014–19); Rockland Trust Bank Pavilion (2019–21)
- Address: 290 Northern Ave; Boston, MA 02210-2016
- Location: Seaport District
- Owner: Live Nation
- Capacity: 5,000

Construction
- Opened: August 12, 1994
- Renovated: 1998–99
- Architect: FTL Associates
- Structural engineers: Ross Dalland, P.E.

Website
- www.leaderbank.com/about/leader-bank-pavilion/
- Building details

Renovating team
- Architect: A.Form Architecture
- Engineer: BuroHappold
- Structural engineer: Span Systems, Inc.
- Civil engineer: H. W. Moore Associates, Inc.
- Main contractor: Beacon Skanska

Leader Bank Pavilion is an outdoor amphitheater in Boston, Massachusetts, United States. Seating 5,000, it is used for concerts from May to October of each year. The venue originally opened in August 1994 near Fan Pier. Due to land rights, it closed at the end of its season in 1998 and the tensile structure was relocated to its current location in South Boston, where it reopened in July 1999.

== Name rights ==
- Harbor Lights Pavilion was the original name. Originally located at the site of the current US District Courthouse at Fan Pier, it was moved a few hundred yards down the street when the courthouse was built.
- Bank of Boston Pavilion.
- BankBoston Pavilion. When Bank of Boston and Baybank merged in 1996 to form BankBoston, the pavilion likewise changed its name to the BankBoston Pavilion.
- FleetBoston Pavilion. In 1999, Live Nation purchased the venue and sold the naming rights to FleetBoston Financial, renaming it FleetBoston Pavilion.
- Bank of America Pavilion. In 2004 FleetBoston merged with Bank of America and the pavilion was then renamed to Bank of America Pavilion.
- Blue Hills Bank Pavilion. Beginning January 1, 2014, Blue Hills Bank won the naming rights for the venue for a period of just under 10 years.
- Rockland Trust Bank Pavilion. Beginning February 4, 2019, following Rockland Trust Bank's acquisition of Blue Hills Bank.
- Leader Bank Pavilion. Beginning April 5, 2021, Leader Bank purchased naming rights for the venue.

== Noted performers ==
- 311
- Al Jarreau
- Alison Krauss
- The All American Rejects
- The Allman Brothers Band
- Amy Grant
- The Arcade Fire
- Barenaked Ladies – 2010, 2012, 2013, 2015, 2016, 2018, 2022, 2023
- B.B. King
- The Beach Boys in 2012 during their 50th Anniversary Reunion Tour
- Beck
- Björk
- Big Time Rush
- Billie Eilish
- Black Rebel Motorcycle Club -(B.R.M.C.) – 2022
- Blondie
- Britney Spears
- Chicago
- Chris Cornell
- Coldplay
- Counting Crows
- The Cult – 2022
- Culture Club
- Cypress Hill
- Dan Fogelberg
- Dashboard Confessional
- David Byrne
- David Gray
- Demi Lovato
- Diana Ross
- Don Henley
- Donna Summer
- Dream Theater
- Elvis Costello and The Attractions
- Extreme
- Faith No More
- Father John Misty
- Fifth Harmony
- Florence and the Machine
- Frank Sinatra
- Gipsy Kings
- Goose (American band)
- Gorillaz
- Guster
- Imagine Dragons
- Jackson Browne
- James Brown
- Jane's Addiction – 2024
- Joan Jett and the Blackhearts
- John Denver
- Jonas Brothers
- Josh Groban
- J Geils Band
- King Crimson
- Keane
- Lauryn Hill
- Liam Gallagher
- Liza Minnelli
- Luther Vandross
- Marina Diamandis
- Mastodon
- Megadeth
- Meghan Trainor – 2015, 2016
- Modest Mouse
- Muse
- Nas
- Natalie Cole
- New Order
- Night Ranger
- Nina Simone
- No Doubt
- Norah Jones
- Peter Frampton
- Pet Shop Boys
- Phoebe Bridgers
- Poison
- Primus
- Radiohead
- Richard Ashcroft
- Rob Thomas – 2016
- Roberta Flack
- Roxy Music
- Ryan Adams
- Sammy Hagar and the Circle
- Spoon
- Steely Dan
- Steve Miller Band
- Stevie Wonder
- Styx
- The Strokes
- Sublime with Rome
- Tori Amos
- Twenty One Pilots
- Van Morrison
- Ween
- "Weird Al" Yankovic (Strings Attached Tour)

== Recordings ==
On September 7, 1997, Widespread Panic recorded a version of their song "Pickin' Up the Pieces" with special guest Branford Marsalis for the live album Light Fuse, Get Away.

On August 21, 2007, progressive metal band Dream Theater recorded three songs for their live album and DVD Chaos in Motion 2007–2008.

On August 10, 2022, folk band Fleet Foxes recorded an entire concert played at the Leader Bank Pavilion and released their album Live on Boston Harbor on April 20, 2024, for Record Store Day.

== See also ==
- List of contemporary amphitheatres
