= Joseph Remick House =

Historic house in Massachusetts, United States

- U.S. National Register of Historic Places
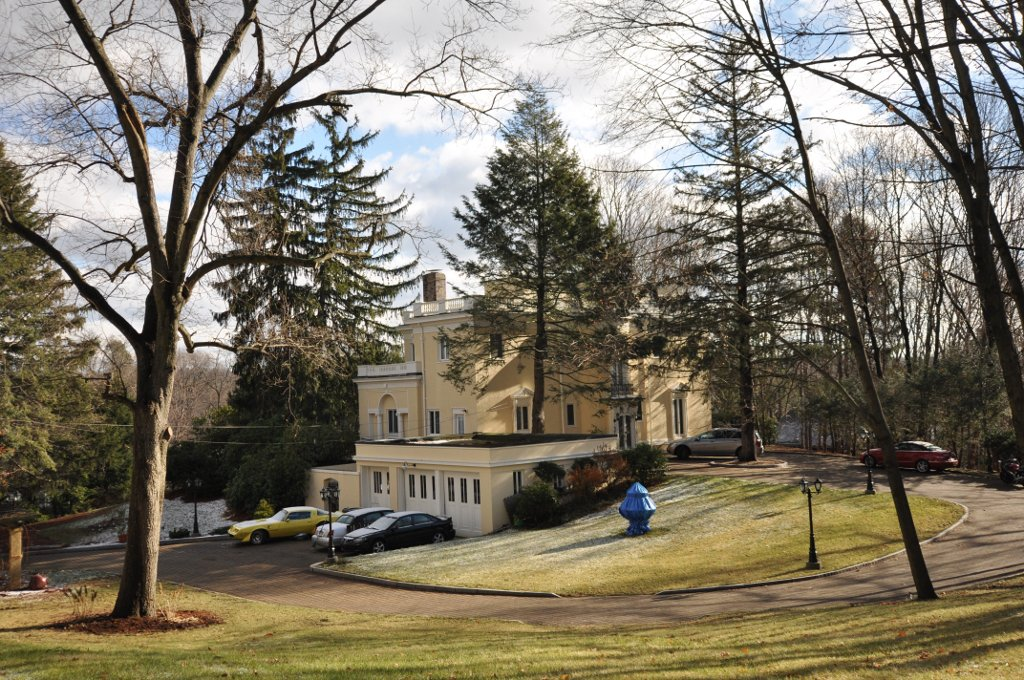

- Location within Massachusetts Location within the United States
- Location: 4 Swan Road, Winchester, Massachusetts
- Coordinates: 42°26′37″N 71°9′11″W
- Built: 1909
- Architectural style: Classical Revival
- MPS: Winchester MRA
- NRHP reference No.: 89000656
- Added to NRHP: July 5, 1989

The Joseph Remick House is a historic house in Winchester, Massachusetts. The two story stucco-clad house was built in 1909 by Joseph Remick, and is sometimes called the "Baby Sanborn House" for its resemblance to the much larger Sanborn House just down the road. The house has a central five-bay section, which is flanked by wings that are one story in front and two in back. The main section is five bays wide, with French windows on both floors. The center three on the first floor are topped by triangular pediments, while those on the second floor have keystones set just below a Greek key frieze. A balustrade rings the flat roof.

The house was listed on the National Register of Historic Places in 1989.

== See also ==
- National Register of Historic Places listings in Winchester, Massachusetts
