= Honan's Block and 112–114 Main Street =

- U.S. National Register of Historic Places
- U.S. Historic district – Contributing property
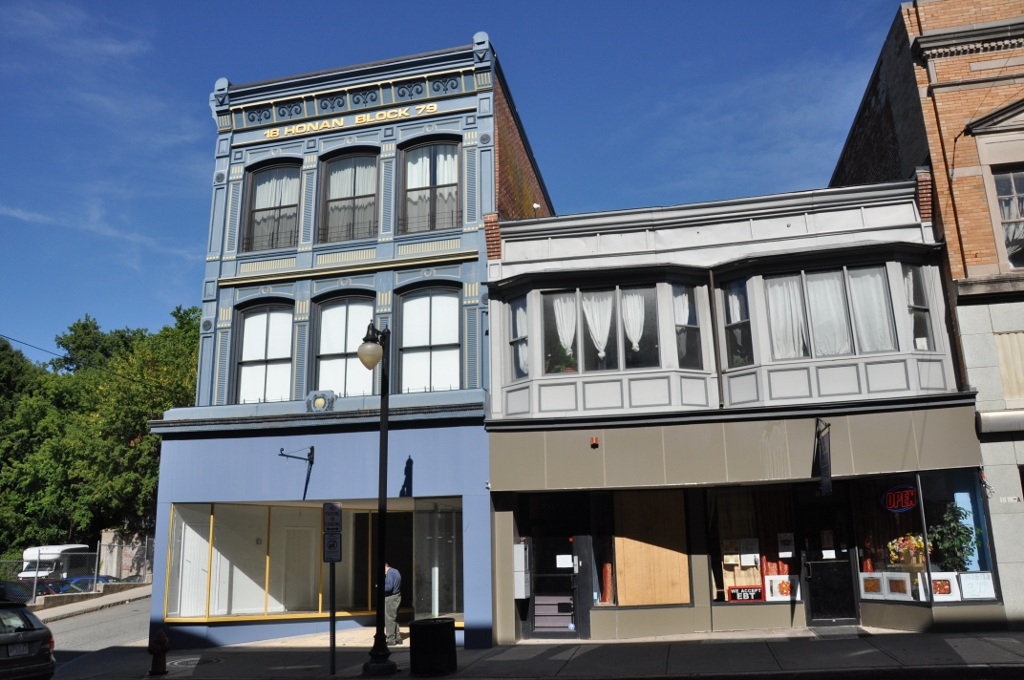

- Location within Rhode Island Location within the United States
- Location: 108–114 Main St., Woonsocket, Rhode Island
- Coordinates: 42.00224°N 71.51487°W
- Built: 1879
- Architectural style: Stick/Eastlake
- Part of: Main Street Historic District (ID91000461)
- MPS: Woonsocket MRA
- NRHP reference No.: 89000941

Significant dates
- Added to NRHP: August 3, 1989
- Designated CP: April 18, 1991

Honan's Block and 112–114 Main Street are a pair of joined commercial buildings in Woonsocket, Rhode Island. Honan's Block (108–110 Main Street) is a visually distinctive three-story brick Stick/Eastlake-style building erected in 1879. The adjacent 112–114 Main Street is an L-shaped two-story block which wraps around the rear of the Honan Block. The two buildings were joined via internal connections in 1938–39, at which time the facades of both buildings were significantly altered, although the Honan Block has retained its distinctive Late Victorian cast-iron elements.

The buildings were listed on the National Register of Historic Places in 1989, and contribute to the 1991 Main Street Historic District.

== See also ==
- National Register of Historic Places listings in Providence County, Rhode Island
