= Shubert Theatre (Boston) =

Theater in Boston, Massachusetts

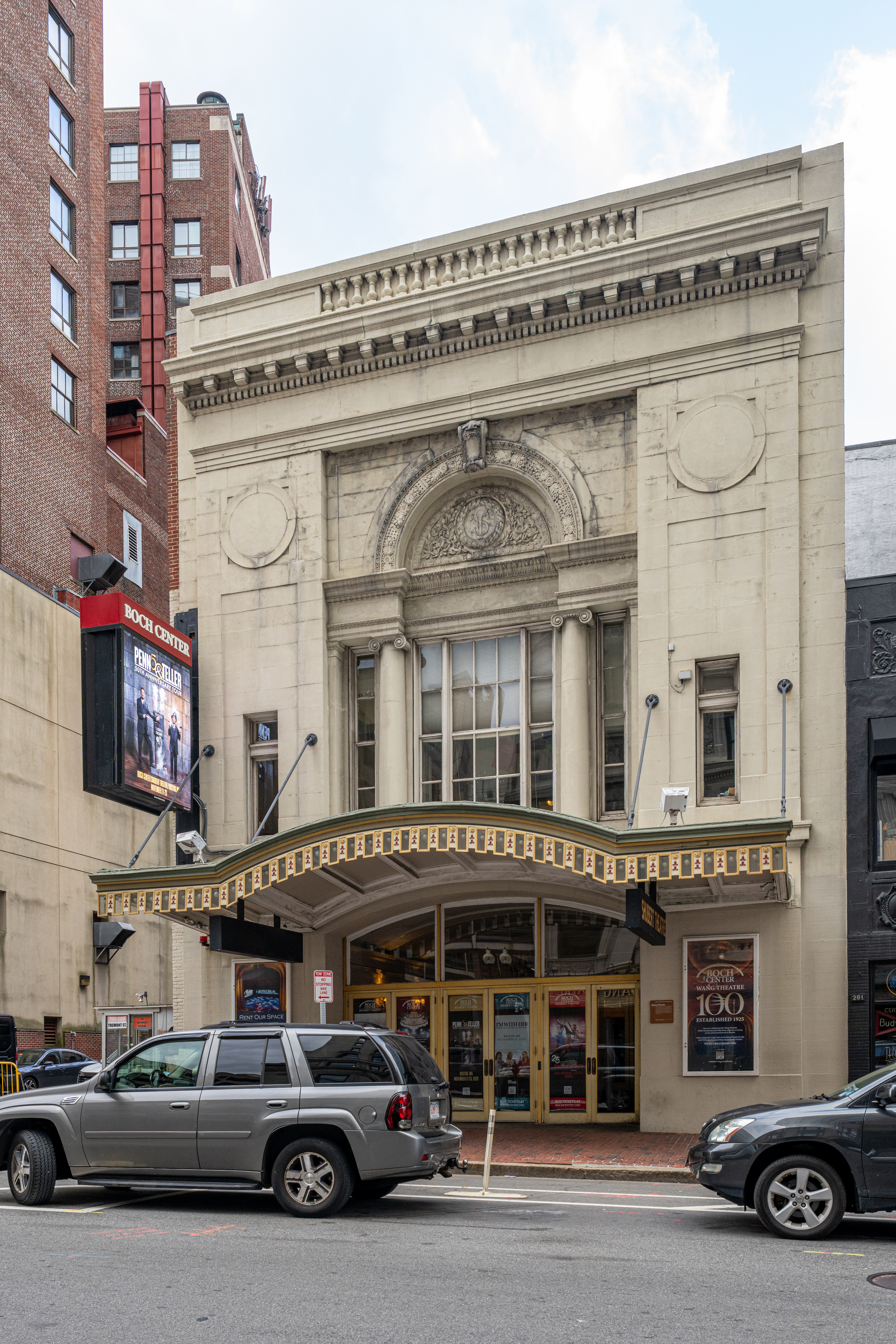
- Shubert Theatre at the Boch Center, 2025
- Interactive map of Shubert Theatre
- Full name: Shubert Theatre at the Boch Center
- Former names: Shubert Theatre at the Wang Center
- Address: 265 Tremont Street
- Location: Boston, Massachusetts
- Coordinates: 42.3504°N 71.0654°W
- Owner: The Shubert Organization
- Operator: Boch Center
- Capacity: 1,600
- Type: Theatre
- Public transit: Boylston, Tufts Medical Center

Construction
- Built: 1908
- Opened: January 10, 1910; 116 years ago
- Renovated: 1996
- Architect: Thomas M. James

Website
- www.bochcenter.org
- Sam S. Shubert Theatre
- U.S. National Register of Historic Places
- Location within Massachusetts
- Architects: Hill, James, & Whitaker; Et al.
- MPS: Boston Theatre MRA
- NRHP reference No.: 80000444
- Added to NRHP: December 9, 1980

The Shubert Theatre is a theatre in Boston, Massachusetts, at 263–265 Tremont Street in the Boston Theater District. The building has been listed on the National Register of Historic Places since 1980.

== History ==
Architect Thomas M. James (Hill, James, & Whitaker) designed the building, which seats approximately 1,600 people. Originally conceived as The Lyric Theatre by developer Charles H. Bond, it was taken over by The Shubert Organization in 1908 after Bond's death. The theater was named in honor of Sam S. Shubert, middle brother of the Shubert family, who had died in 1905.

The theater opened on January 24, 1910, with a production of Shakespeare's The Taming of the Shrew, starring E. H. Sothern and Julia Marlowe.

The building was added to the National Register of Historic Places as the Sam S. Shubert Theatre in 1980. In February 1996, the Wang Center for the Performing Arts signed a 40-year lease agreement to operate the theatre with the Shubert Organization, which continues to own the building and property.

The theatre reopened after renovation in November 1996, as the first stop on the first national tour of the musical Rent. The Boch family became the namesake of the center in 2016, making the full name of the theatre the Shubert Theatre at the Boch Center.

== Pre-Broadway engagements ==
- 1928: Here’s Howe
- 1943: Early to Bed
- 1949: South Pacific
- 1950: Arms and the Girl, Call Me Madam, Out of This World
- 1951: The King and I, Paint Your Wagon, A Month of Sundays
- 1952: Three Wishes for Jamie
- 1953: Me and Juliet, John Murray Anderson's Almanac
- 1954: By the Beautiful Sea, The Pajama Game, Fanny, Hit the Trail
- 1955: Ankles Aweigh, Damn Yankees, Reuben, Reuben, Pipe Dream
- 1956: The Amazing Adele, The Most Happy Fella, Ziegfeld Follies of 1956, Shangri-La, Bells Are Ringing, Happy Hunting
- 1957: New Girl in Town, Jamaica
- 1958: Flower Drum Song
- 1959: Juno, Destry Rides Again, Take Me Along, The Sound of Music, Fiorello!, The Pink Jungle
- 1960: Lock Up Your Daughters!, Tenderloin, Camelot
- 1961: Kean
- 1963: 110 in the Shade
- 1964: Funny Girl, Golden Boy, Ben Franklin in Paris, Bajour, Baker Street
- 1965: Kelly, Do I Hear a Waltz?, The Roar of the Greasepaint - The Smell of the Crowd, Hot September
- 1966: Mame, The Apple Tree, Cabaret, Breakfast at Tiffany's
- 1967: Darling of the Day
- 1968: Her First Roman, Zorba
- 1970: Company, Two By Two, No, No, Nanette
- 1971: Prettybelle, Lolita, My Love, On the Town
- 1972: Sugar
- 1973: Molly
- 1974: Gypsy
- 1975: Pacific Overtures
- 1976: Rex, The Baker's Wife
- 1978: The Prince of Grand Street
- 1981: Dreamgirls
- 1983: Private Lives
- 1988: Cats

== See also ==
- National Register of Historic Places listings in northern Boston, Massachusetts
