= 75 Federal Street =

Building in Boston, Massachusetts

Coordinates: 42.3551°N 71.0567°W

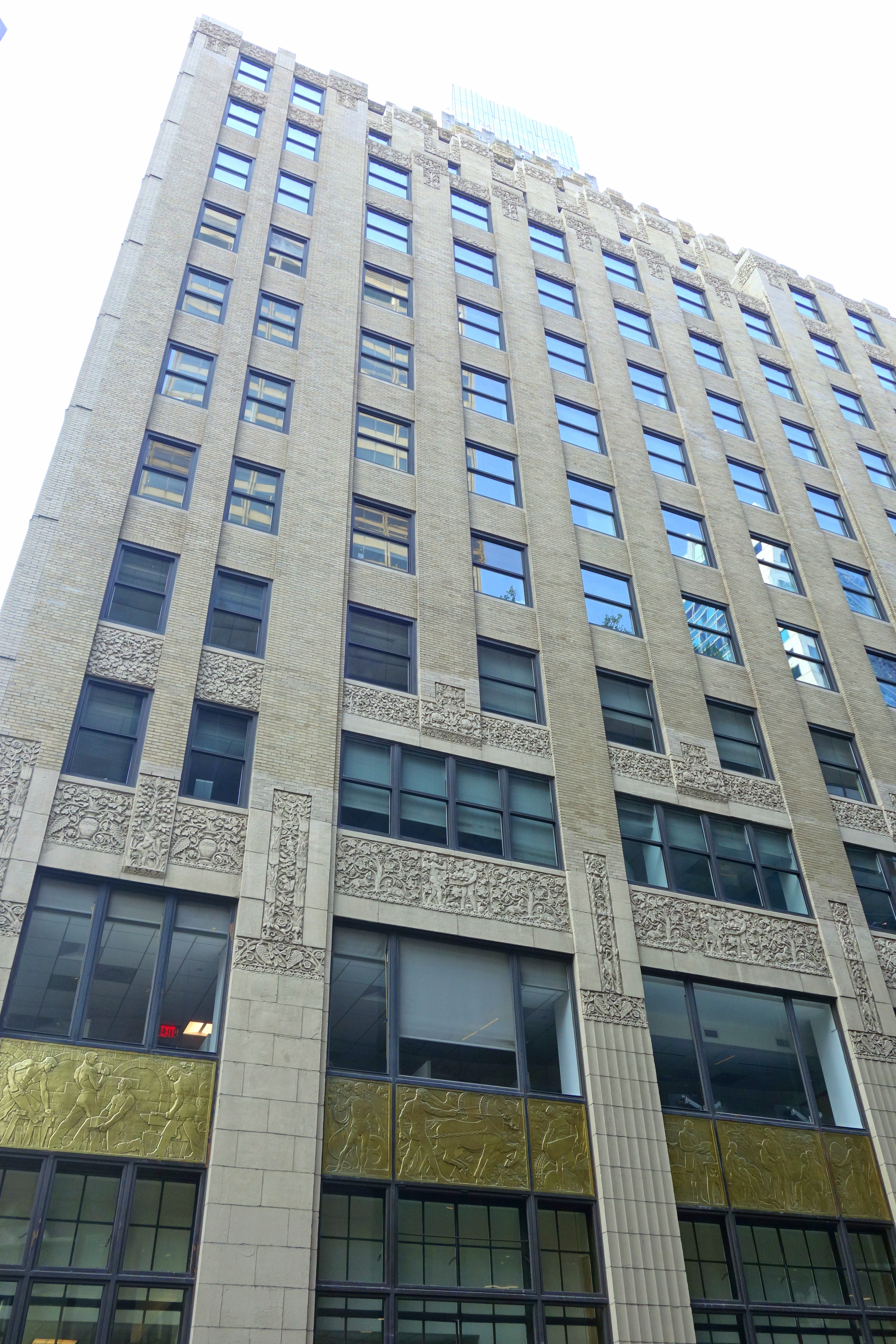
75 Federal Street in 2025

75 Federal Street, originally known as the Second National Bank Building, is an Art Deco building in Boston, Massachusetts, designed by Thomas Marriott James and built in 1929. It is now part of a massing known as 75-101 Federal Street that incorporates a newer skyscraper.

The building is 21 stories tall with a stepped-back roof and penthouse. Its entry features pilasters and bas-relief sculptures of heroic figures. A series of repeated panels by Paul Fjelde decorate its exterior with bronze reliefs of Agriculture, Mining, Manufacturing, Power, Finance, and Transportation, with additional decoration above in cast stone.

75 Federal Street won an Art Deco Preservation Award in 1992 from the Art Deco Society of Boston.
