= United Electric Co. Building =

- U.S. National Register of Historic Places
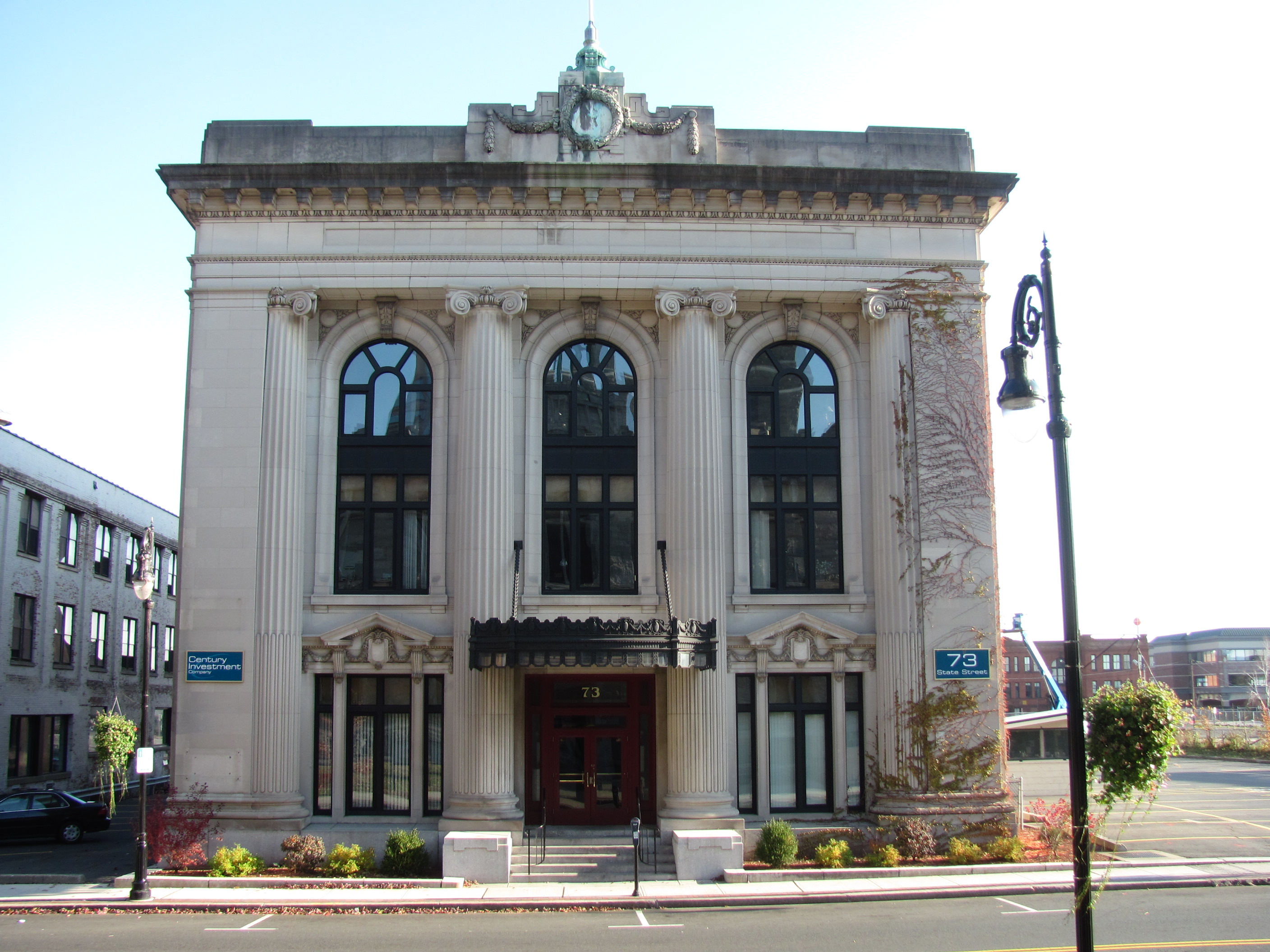
- 2011 photo, prior to casino construction

- Location within Massachusetts Location within the United States
- Location: 73 State St., Springfield, Massachusetts
- Coordinates: 42°6′0″N 72°35′18″W
- Area: less than one acre
- Built: 1910
- Architect: James, Thomas M.
- Architectural style: Beaux Arts
- MPS: Downtown Springfield MRA
- NRHP reference No.: 83000772
- Added to NRHP: February 24, 1983

The United Electric Co. Building was a historic commercial building at 73 State Street in Springfield, Massachusetts. One of the city's few Beaux-Arts buildings, it was built in 1910 to serve as the headquarters of the United Electric Company, Springfield's supplier of electricity since the 1880s. It was listed on the National Register of Historic Places in 1983. It has been mostly demolished, preserving the facade as part of the MGM Springfield casino project.

== Description and history ==
The United Electric Company Building was set on the southeast side of State Street in Springfield's downtown area. It was a tall two-story building, fashioned out of cut limestone. Its main facade is three bays wide, delineated by full-height fluted Ionic engaged columns. The upper part of each bay has tall round-arch windows set in a rounded surround with keystone at the top and small brackets at the base. The center entrance is sheltered by a projecting wrought iron canopy. The building's cornice is modillioned and dentillated, and the roof is capped by a parapet with a clockface set in an elaborate surround.

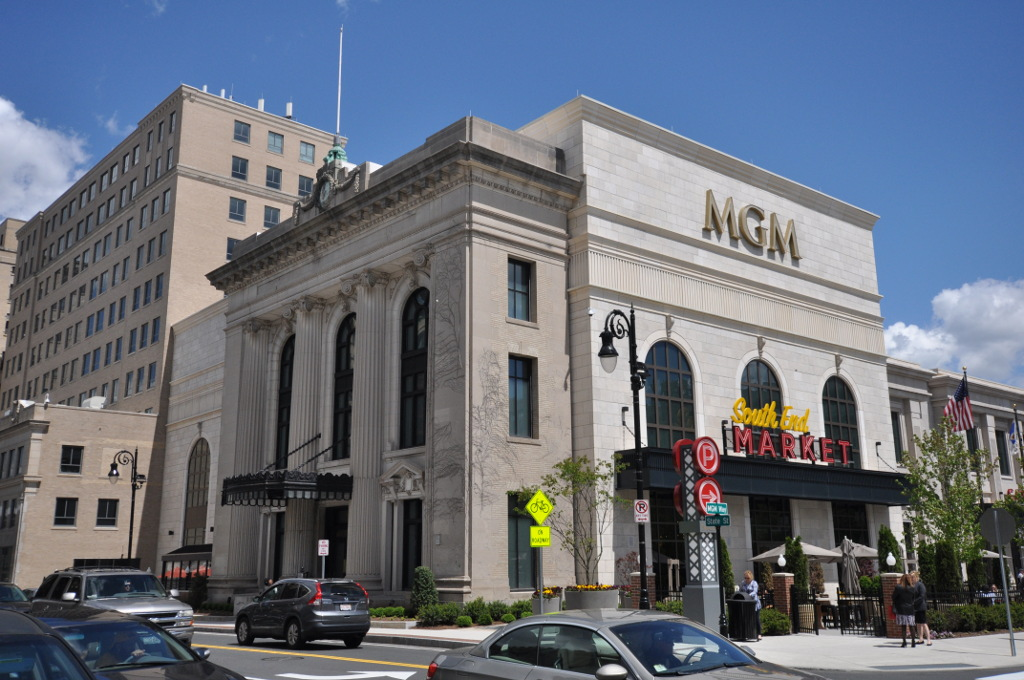
The building facade as part of the MGM casino

The United Electric Company, founded in 1887, was the second enterprise established to provide electricity on a large scale to the city of Springfield. The first was founded in 1882 but did not last long. United Electric's first power plant stood at the foot of State Street. This building was constructed in 1910 to serve as its headquarters; it was designed by Boston architect Thomas M. James, who was known for his designs of bank buildings. United Electric was consolidated into the Western Massachusetts Electric Company in 1947. The building has been mostly demolished to make way for MGM Springfield casino; its facade was retained, and will form part of the casino's street frontage.

== See also ==
- Union Trust Company Building (Springfield, Massachusetts), another Beaux-Arts landmark
- National Register of Historic Places listings in Springfield, Massachusetts
- National Register of Historic Places listings in Hampden County, Massachusetts
