= Charles F. Gerry =

American politician (1823–1900)

Charles Frederick Gerry
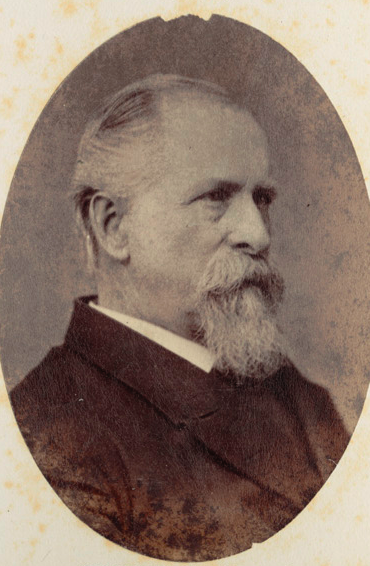
- Gerry in 1880
- Born: June 3, 1823; Sudbury, Massachusetts
- Died: September 4, 1900 (aged 77); Sudbury, Massachusetts
- Occupations: Businessman, politician, writer

Charles Frederick Gerry (June 3, 1823 – September 4, 1900) was an American businessman, politician, and writer.

== Early life ==
Gerry was born on June 3, 1823, in Sudbury, Massachusetts, to Charles and Orisa Gerry. After graduating from Wesleyan University, Gerry worked as a teacher at the Boston Mercantile Academy and the Fort Hill School.

== Business career ==
In 1858, Gerry left teach to work in the insurance business. From 1863 to 1873 he was a general agent of the John Hancock Life Insurance Company in Boston. He then worked as a special agent of the New England Life Insurance Company.

In 1871 Gerry became the founding president of the Hyde Park Savings Bank.

== Political career ==
In 1877 Gerry represented Hyde Park in the Massachusetts House of Representatives. He moved to Sudbury soon thereafter and in 1880, represented that community (along with Maynard, Wayland, and Weston) in the House. From 1881 to 1883 he served in the Massachusetts Senate.

== Writing ==
Gerry contributed poetry to the Boston Evening Transcript, Our Young Folks, and the Massachusetts Ploughman. In 1888 he had a book of poetry entitled Meadow Melodies published by Lee & Shepard.

== Personal life and death ==
Gerry married Martha Ann Clough of Canterbury, New Hampshire, on June 5, 1852. Like Gerry, Clough was a writer who oversaw the editorial pages of the Boston Olive Branch. The couple had four children.

Gerry died on September 4, 1900, in Sudbury.
