= East Cambridge Savings Bank =

- U.S. National Register of Historic Places
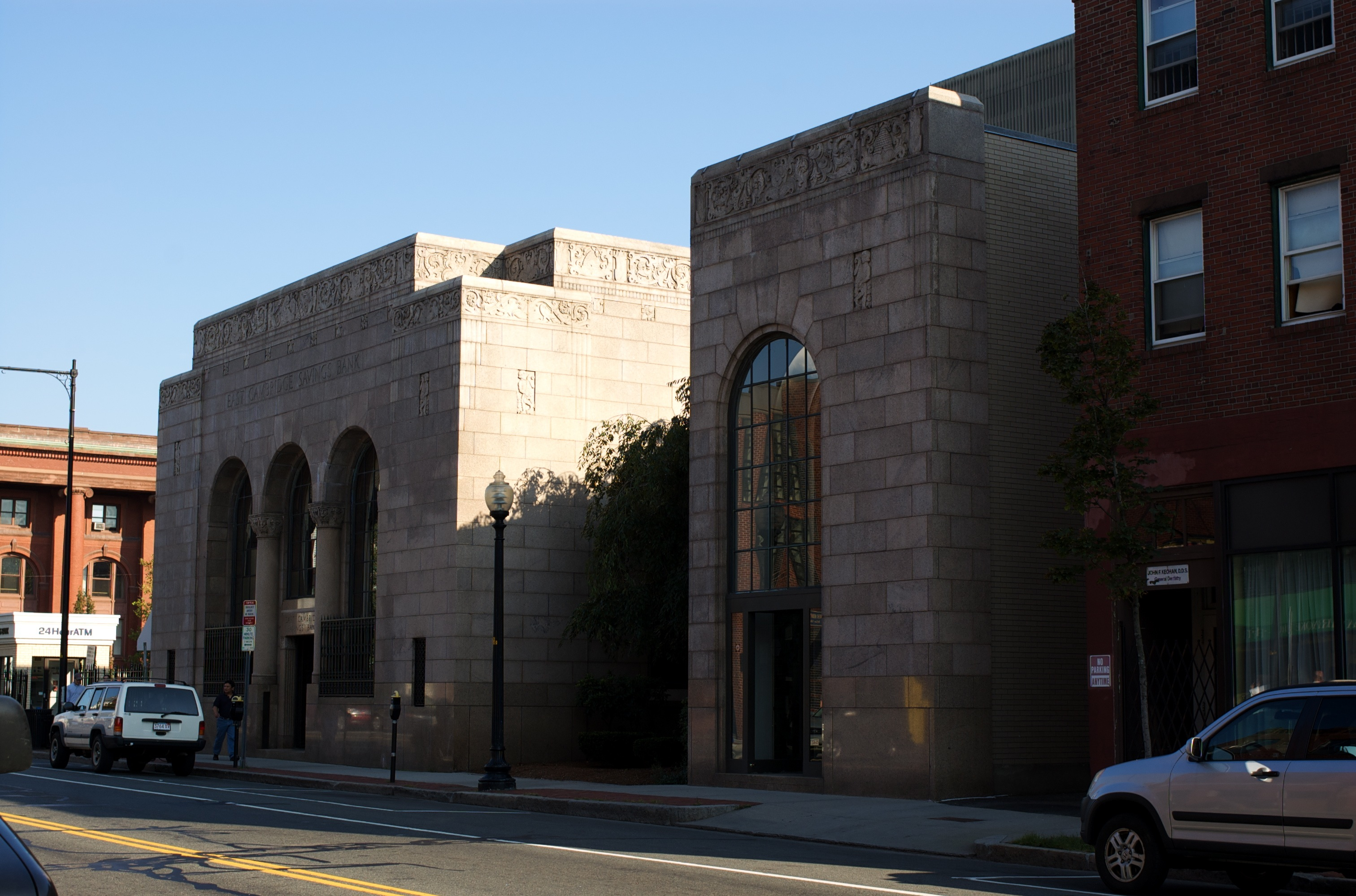

- Location within Massachusetts Location within the United States
- Location: Cambridge, Massachusetts
- Coordinates: 42°22′15.5″N 71°04′51.5″W
- Built: 1931
- Architect: James, T. M.; et al.
- Architectural style: Art Deco
- MPS: Cambridge MRA
- NRHP reference No.: 82001938
- Added to NRHP: April 13, 1982

East Cambridge Savings Bank is a mutual savings bank in Massachusetts. Its branches serve communities north and west of Boston, Massachusetts. It was founded in 1854.

The bank's Art Deco headquarters building at 292 Cambridge Street in East Cambridge, Massachusetts was built in 1931 to a design by T. M. James. It has a triple-arched front facade, an element repeated on the side with three similarly scaled round-arch windows. Bands of carving adorn an entablature band at the top of the main wall, and on a stepped back section above. The building's interior includes sculpture by Paul Fjelde and murals painted by Alfred Rasmussen. The building was listed on the National Register of Historic Places in 1982.

== See also ==
- National Register of Historic Places listings in Cambridge, Massachusetts
