= Rockland Trust Company (building) =

Historic bank building in Massachusetts, United States

- U.S. National Register of Historic Places
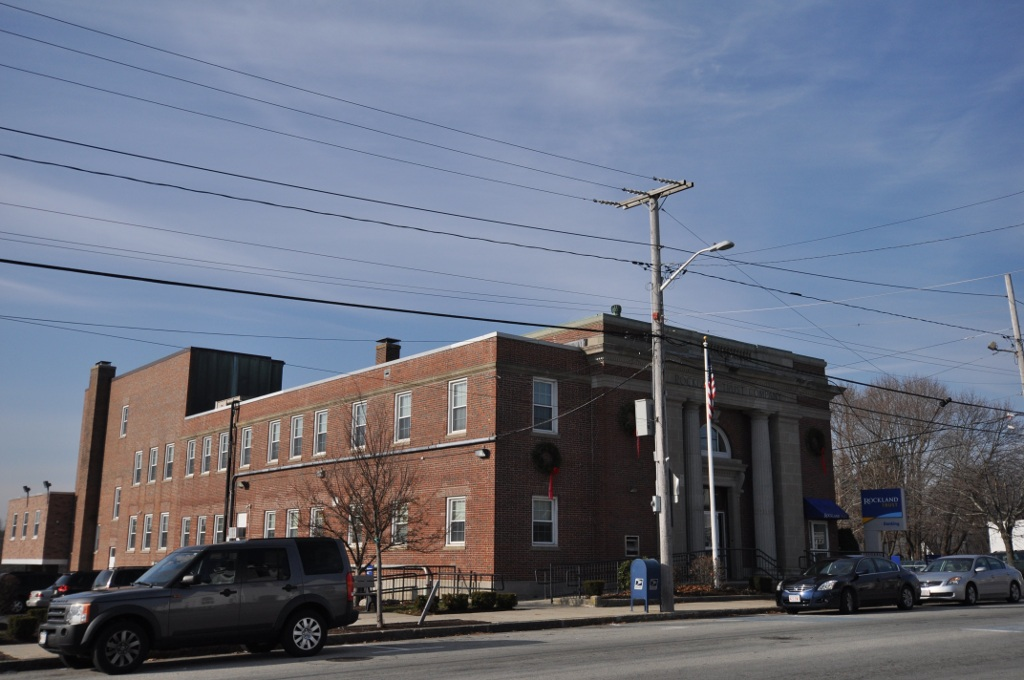
- 2013 photo

- Location within Massachusetts Location within the United States
- Location: 288 Union St., Rockland, Massachusetts
- Coordinates: 42°8′10″N 70°54′59″W
- Area: 1.5 acres (0.61 ha)
- Built: 1917
- Architect: James, Thomas E. & Co.
- Architectural style: Colonial Revival, Other
- NRHP reference No.: 89000218
- Added to NRHP: April 7, 1989

The Rockland Trust Company building is a historic bank building and a branch of the Rockland Trust Company at 288 Union Street in Rockland, Massachusetts. The bank was founded in 1907, and was originally in offices across the street before commission this building in 1917. It is a two-story brick building designed by Boston architect Thomas M. James, a well-known specialist in bank design. A single-story addition was added in 1923, which was raised to two stories in 1947. A three-story addition was added in 1947. The original building and additions are all built of red brick laid in Flemish bond. The main entry is recessed behind a pair of massive columns, which are flanked on the facade by a pair of pilasters, which support an entablature that is topped by a brick parapet and granite balustrade. The bank's corporate headquarters were housed here until 2008.

The building was listed on the National Register of Historic Places in 1989.

== Images ==
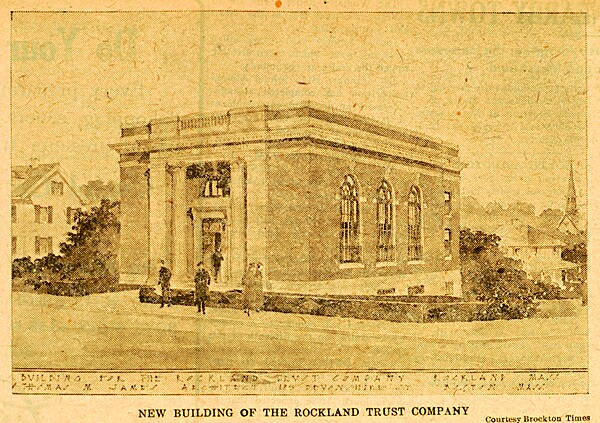
1917: Rockland Trust Company's "new" building, as it appeared after its opening. (Photo from the Brockton Times.)

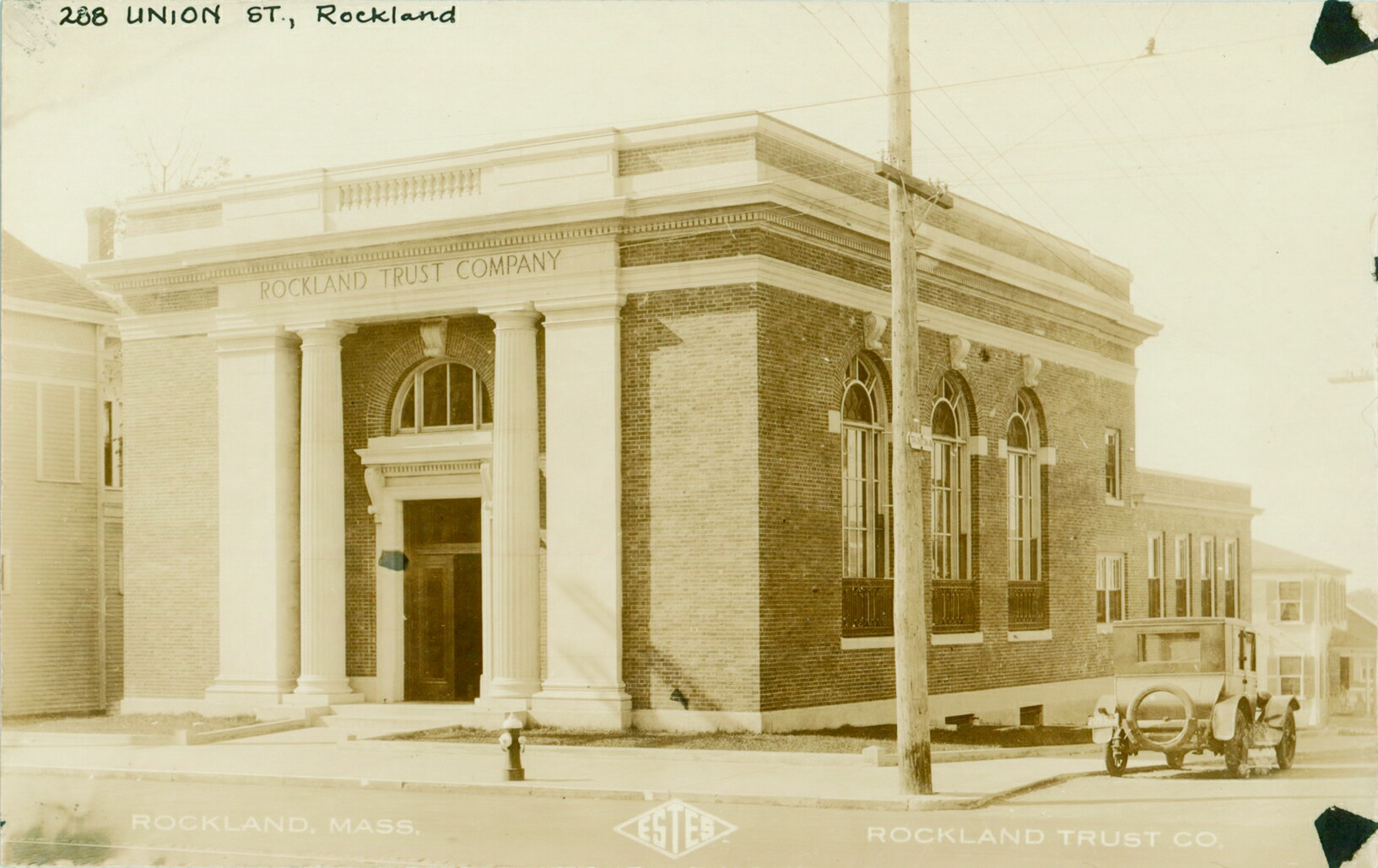
1924: After 1st set of renovations, including a large addition in the back.

== See also ==
- National Register of Historic Places listings in Plymouth County, Massachusetts
