= Stay Law of 1878 =

Banking law in Massachusetts, US

The Stay Law of 1878 was a law passed by the state of Massachusetts on March 21, 1878, in response to the continuing effects of the Panic of 1873. The law "was hastily enacted" out of fear of a run on the banks, and was purportedly intended to protect the interests of depositors in the banks of the state by empowering the state's Bank Commissioners to limit the times and amounts that a bank account holder ("depositor") could withdraw funds from a bank in the state.

== Provisions ==
The key language of the law was as follows:

Whenever, in the judgment of the board of commissioners of savings banks, the security and welfare of the depositors in any savings bank in this Commonwealth shall require a limitation or regulation of payments to its depositors, said board may, by an order in writing directed to such bank, limit and regulate such payments in time and amount as the interests of all the depositors may require. Such order shall fully express the terms of said limitation or regulation; and it may be changed or wholly revoked whenever in the judgment of said commissioners the welfare of the depositors in such bank shall so require.

The right of appeal to the court was reserved to the depositor in case of any dissatisfaction, with such an aggrieved person having the right of appeal to the Massachusetts Supreme Judicial Court, which should give public hearing upon the facts, and then affirm or annul the order of the commissioners. The decision of that tribunal was to be final. The law was self-limited to three years.

In May 1879, a supplement to the law was passed, giving debtors of a bank the right to set off a deposit against a claim, where both were vested in the same individual, provided said deposit was not made over from another person subsequent to the commencement of a suit. Massachusetts Attorney General George Marston, however, advised banks that this amendment was likely unconstitutional due to its implied favoritism toward certain debtors, and that they should therefore not act on it.

== Implementation and effects ==
The first bank to take advantage of the stay law was the Brighton Five Cents, which applied the day the law passed the Legislature. In this case, the Bank Commissioners directed that, during the period from March 21st to September 21st, 1878, not more than 10 per cent of the total amount due should be paid to each depositor; 10 per cent additional was to be paid during the period from September 21st to March 21st, 1879. No further sums were to be paid except by order of the commissioners.

The law "produced instantly the desired effect of preventing runs, and thus secured to depositors full payment of their deposits which they might otherwise have lost". Between the passage of the stay law in March, 1878, and November 1st, 1879, twenty-four banks availed themselves of its protection, all but six of which resumed at the expiration of the prescribed limit of time, where the order had not been previously revoked. Of these six, all but one were ultimately restored to full corporate functions, the Ashburnham alone going into voluntary liquidation. Out of the 180 savings banks that were in operation as of October, 1875, 46 were forced either to suspend payment entirely, or to seek refuge under the "stay law". Of those, 24 were stopped by injunction of the Supreme Court, and twelve of these were obliged ultimately to close their affairs, with only two paying depositors in full.

Despite the benefits that the law provided for the banks, it "gave rise to ridicule and defamation from outsiders".
