= Downtown Seymour Historic District =

- U.S. National Register of Historic Places
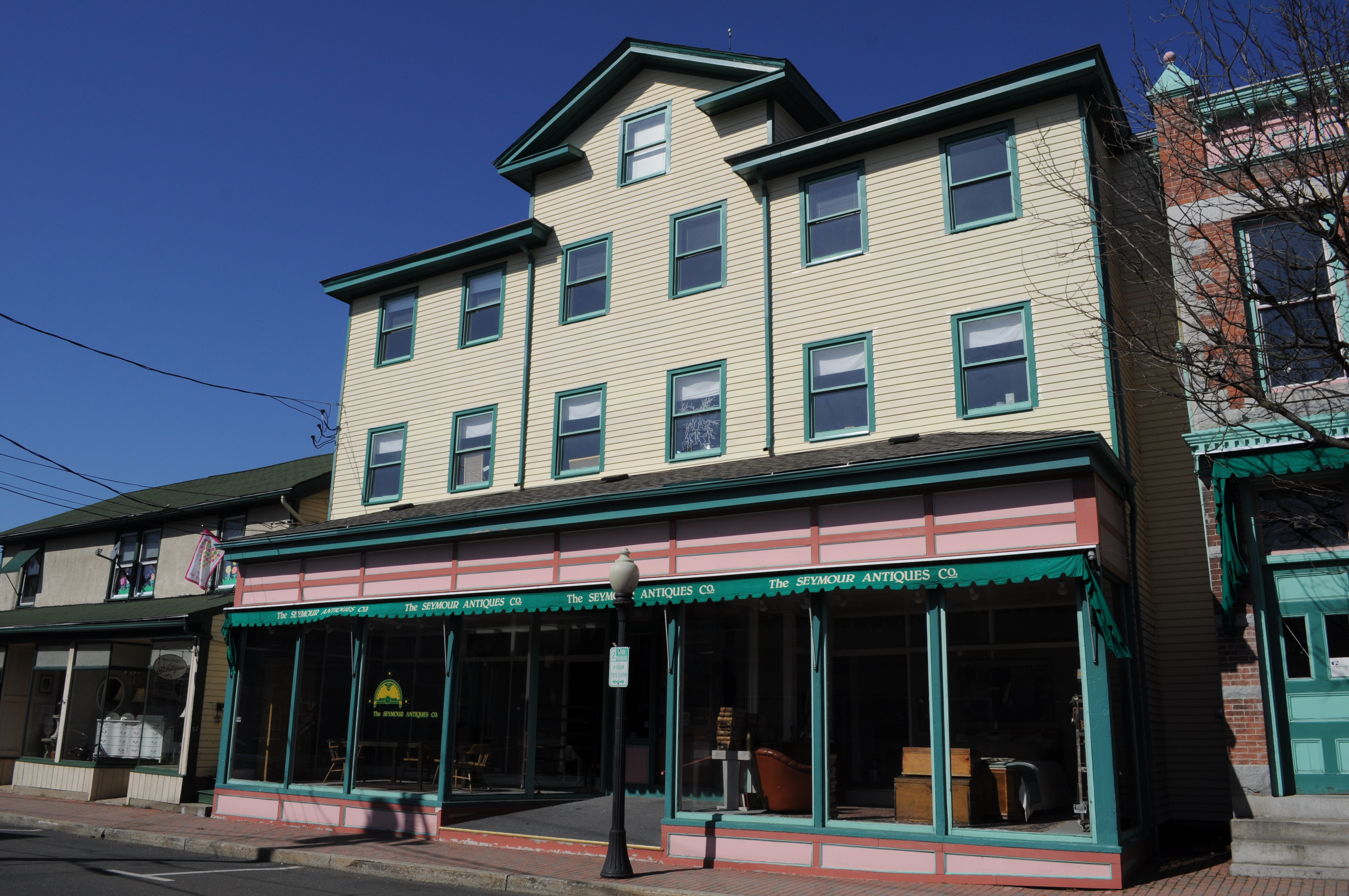

- Location within Connecticut Location within the United States
- Location: Roughly bounded by the Naugatuck River, Main, Wakeley, and DeForest Streets, Seymour, Connecticut
- Coordinates: 41°23′39″N 73°04′28″W
- Area: 21 acres (8.5 ha)
- Built: 1850
- NRHP reference No.: 83001279
- Added to NRHP: August 25, 1983

The Downtown Seymour Historic District encompasses most of the historic downtown of Seymour, Connecticut. Sandwiched between Connecticut Route 8 and the tracks of the former Naugatuck Railroad line, now the Waterbury Branch, it developed in the mid-19th century as a successful industrial center dominated by the production of brass goods. The district was listed on the National Register of Historic Places in 1983.

== Description and history ==
The area that is now Seymour was originally part of Derby, and was separately incorporated in 1850. Its industrial and commercial history began in the late 18th century, when John Wooster and Bradford Steele established first a blacksmithy, and then fulling and carding mills at the falls of the Naugatuck River. In 1803, General David Humphreys purchased land and water rights nearby their mills, and established what is believed to be one of the oldest woolen mills in the nation, after bringing a flock of merino sheep over from Spain. Construction of the railroad through the area in the late 1840s brought further expansion, and development of the downtown area, which lasted into the 1920s. During this period, the industrial processing of copper and brass became one of its leading businesses.

The historic district is a roughly rectangular area, with a truncated northwest corner, 21 acres (8.5 ha) in size. It is set in a bend of the Naugatuck River, with CT 8 paralleling the bank west of the district, and the railroad cutting a straight north–south line to its east. There are only a few residences in the district, most of which are vernacular Queen Anne wood-frame structures built late in the 19th century. The oldest building in the district is believed to be the Trestle Tavern, a 2 1/2-story frame structure at 26-28 Main Street built about 1850. The southern end of the district is dominated by the former Waterman Pen complex, an industrial site with associations to the city's brass industry; most of its buildings date to the early 20th century. The town's major civic buildings (town hall, post office, and fire station) are just north of the industrial complex, and the rest of the district consists mainly of commercial buildings built mostly between 1880 and 1940.

== See also ==
- National Register of Historic Places listings in New Haven County, Connecticut
