= Joseph K. James House =

Historic house in Massachusetts, United States

- U.S. National Register of Historic Places
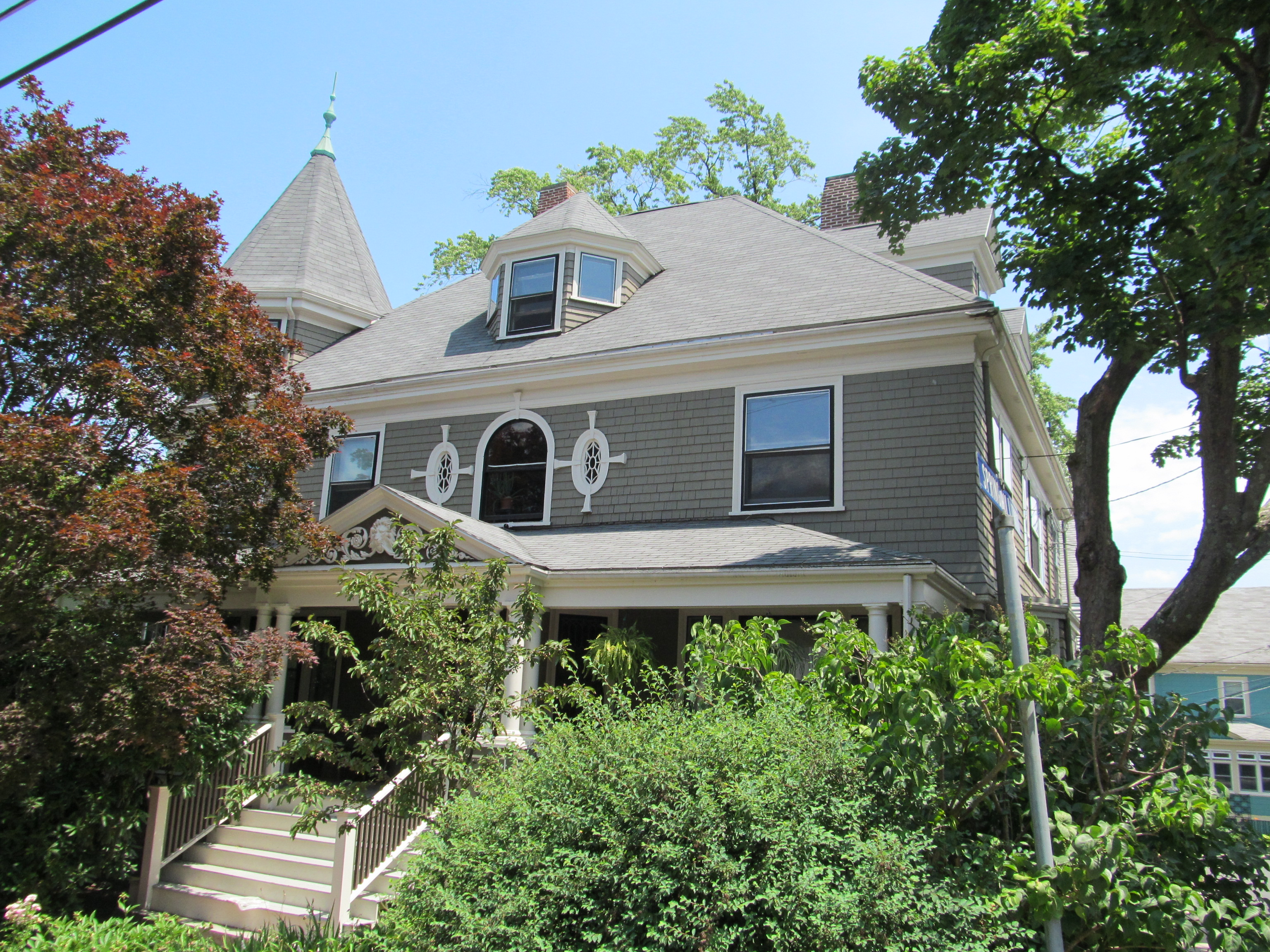
- Joseph K. James House

- Location within Massachusetts Location within the United States
- Location: Somerville, Massachusetts
- Coordinates: 42°23′18.53″N 71°6′28.87″W
- Built: 1893
- Architect: James, Thomas M.; Farrington, Thomas F.
- Architectural style: Queen Anne, Colonial Revival
- MPS: Somerville MPS
- NRHP reference No.: 98000095
- Added to NRHP: February 11, 1998

The Joseph K. James House is a historic house at 83 Belmont Street in Somerville, Massachusetts. This 3 story wood-frame house was built in 1893-4 for Joseph Knightley James, a partner in a local soap manufacturer. It is one of Somerville's best examples of Queen Anne and Colonial Revival styling. It has a rectangular Colonial Revival form with a pitched hip roof, with a Queen Anne turret and chimney tops. The front porch is supported by clusters of columns and features a pedimented gable over the entry that is decorated with a hand-carved lion's head surrounded by a floral design.

The house was listed on the National Register of Historic Places in 1998.

== See also ==
- National Register of Historic Places listings in Somerville, Massachusetts
