= East Boston Savings Bank =

Stock savings bank

- Type: Public company
- Traded as: Nasdaq: EBSB
- Industry: Financial services
- Founded: 1848; 178 years ago in East Boston, Massachusetts
- Fate: Acquired by Rockland Trust
- Headquarters: Peabody, Massachusetts
- Number of locations: 39
- Key people: Richard J. Gavegnano (President, CEO & Chairman)
- Operating income: ▲US$ 236.675 million (2018)
- Net income: ▲US$ 55.771 million (2018)
- Total assets: ▲US$ 6.178 billion (2018)
- Number of employees: 550 (2018)
- Website: EBSB.com

East Boston Savings Bank was a Massachusetts-chartered stock savings bank founded in 1848. The company delivered a wide range of deposit and loan products through the operation of the bank.

Rockland Trust announced it would be acquiring the bank on April 22, 2021 and completed the deal on November 12, 2021.

== History ==
East Boston Savings Bank was established in Maverick Square, East Boston in 1848 by some merchants and shipbuilders, as a result of the booming commerce in Boston.

In 1991, East Boston Savings Bank became a wholly owned subsidiary of Meridian Mutual Holding Company, later known as Meridian Financial Services.

By, 2006 Meridian formed another holding company called Meridian Interstate Bancorp, to which ownership of the bank was transferred.

In 2009, Meridian Interstate entered into a merger agreement with Mt. Washington Cooperative Bank of South Boston, Massachusetts. The merger was consummated in early 2010 and Mt. Washington Bank now operates under its name as a division of East Boston Savings Bank.

In July 2014, Meridian Interstate Bancorp consummated a second step stock conversion. Its top tier holding company MFS ceased to exist and a new corporation, Meridian Bancorp, Inc. was established.

In May 2020, East Boston Savings Bank has collaborated with nearby restaurants in East Boston, South Boston, Dorchester and Revere to provide over 1,300 meals.

In July 2020, East Boston Savings Bank has launched new branches in Salem and Woburn, and plans to launch the third branch of EBSB in Brookline in late summer.

In April 2021, Independent Bank Corp. and Meridian Bancorp, Inc. Sign Merger Agreement for Rockland Trust Company to Acquire East Boston Savings Bank.
