= MGM Springfield =

Casino hotel in Springfield, Massachusetts, United States

Coordinates: 42°5′56.77″N 72°35′13.32″W

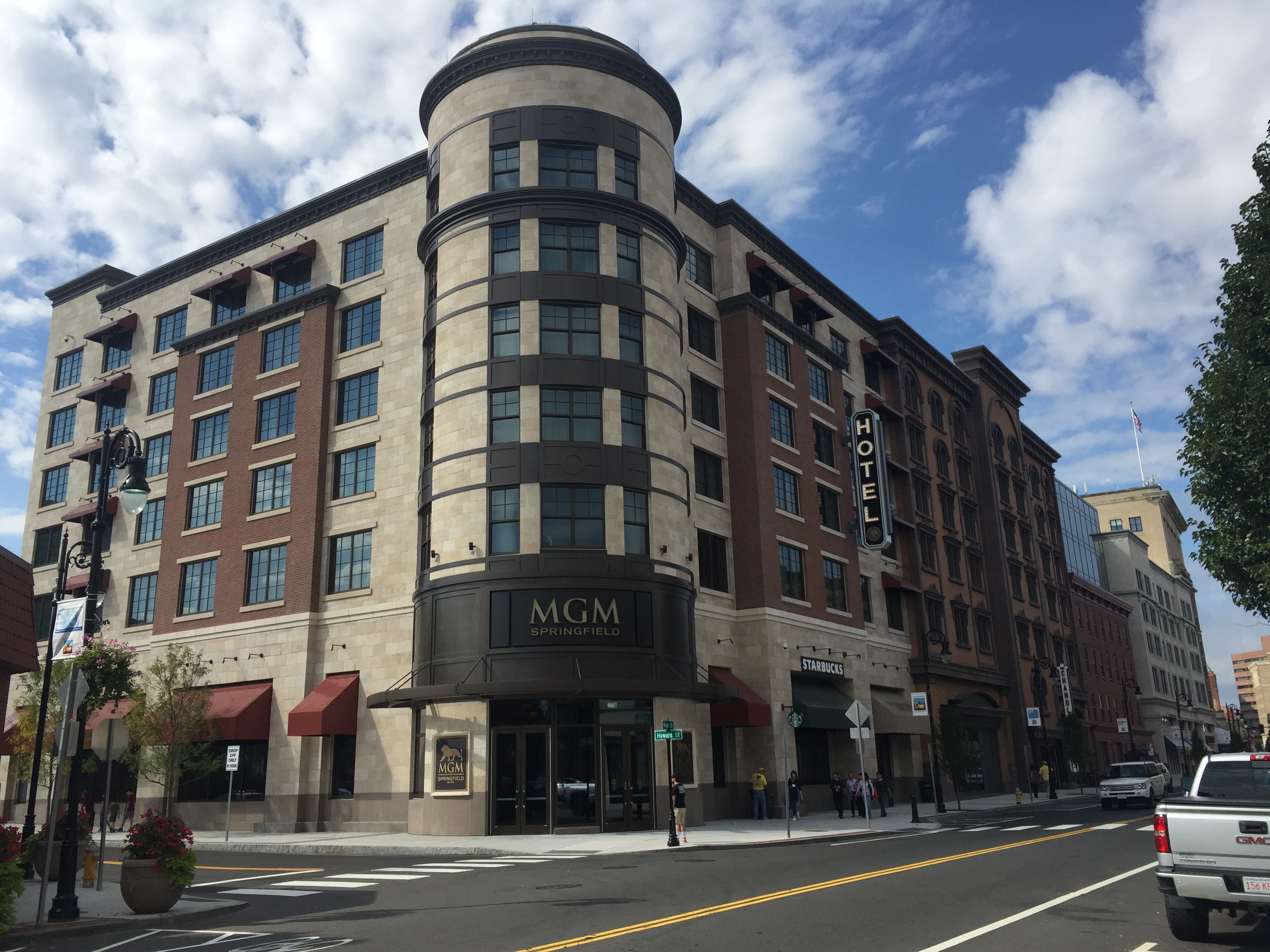
- The MGM Springfield Main Street Block
- Interactive map of MGM Springfield
- Location: Springfield, Massachusetts; One MGM Way, Springfield, MA 01103
- Opened: August 24, 2018
- Theme: Historical Springfield
- No. of rooms: 250
- Gaming space: 125,000 sq ft (11,600 m^{2})
- Signature attractions: Massmutual Center (currently operated by MGM) Outdoor Concert Area Regal Cinemas
- Notable restaurants: WahlBurgers Costa Chandler Steakhouse Taps Sportsbar
- Owner: Vici Properties
- Operating license holder: MGM Resorts International
- Website: mgmspringfield.com

MGM Springfield is a hotel and casino complex situated in the heart of Metro Center, Springfield, Massachusetts, United States. Opening on August 24, 2018 in a block of buildings that are historically or culturally influential to Springfield, it became the first resort casino in the Commonwealth. It is owned by Vici Properties and operated by MGM Resorts International. It was temporarily closed on March 14, 2020, due to the COVID-19 pandemic. It reopened to the public on July 13, 2020, after nearly 4 months of being closed, with safety precautions and reduced capacity in place.

== History ==
=== Proposals ===
MGM Springfield was one of three proposals in the city of Springfield, Massachusetts for the Western Massachusetts casino license. Casinos were also proposed for Holyoke, Palmer, and West Springfield. On December 2, 2012, MGM Springfield and Penn National Gaming's Springfield proposal became the remaining two proposals for Springfield when Ameristar withdrew its Springfield proposal for the former Westinghouse site.

On April 30, 2013, Mayor Dominic Sarno selected MGM Springfield as the winning proposal for the City of Springfield, defeating the Penn National proposal for the north end of the city, and on July 16 Springfield voters approved the casino application, making MGM Springfield the state's first proposal to win voter approval in its host community. MGM was then in a three-way race with Hard Rock's West Springfield proposal and Mohegan Sun's Palmer proposal. On September 11, 2013, West Springfield voters voted to block the Hard Rock proposal, leaving only MGM and Mohegan Sun in the race for the license. MGM Springfield won the bid for the Western Massachusetts license on November 6, 2013, when Palmer voters blocked the Mohegan Sun proposal, leaving MGM Springfield as the only Western Massachusetts proposal to win voter approval. (Had either Hard Rock or Mohegan Sun won voter approval, the state's gaming commission would have had to make the final decision.)

MGM officially received the license on June 13, 2014. It joined two other license winners: Penn National, which was awarded the slot parlor license, and Wynn Massachusetts, which was awarded the Eastern Massachusetts Region A casino license. As of November 6, 2014, it received its Region B license and is expected to open in 2018.

On November 4, 2014, a referendum attempting to ban casinos in the state failed. The plan for the construction of the casino at the time would have required the demolition of some buildings in downtown, including the partial demolition of the former United Electric Co. Building on the National Register of Historic Places.

=== MGM design ===
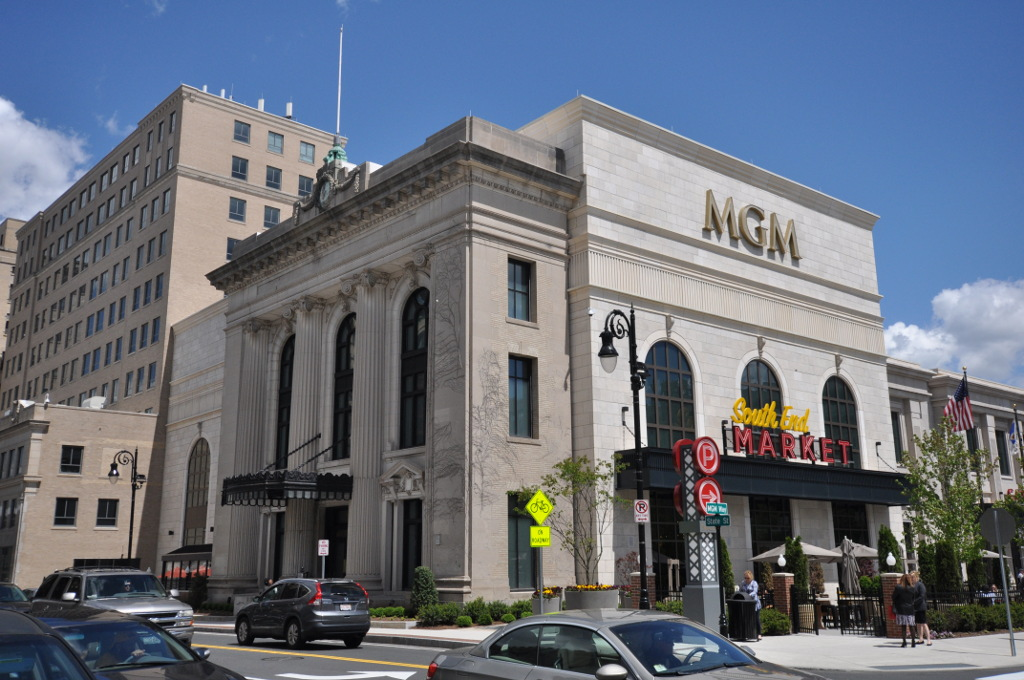
The South End Market, built out of the former United Electric Building, is one example of ways the casino complex was integrated into the city's historical landscape

On September 22, 2015, MGM unveiled a redesigned site plan for the project, abandoning the 25-story glass-facade hotel on State Street in favor of a 6-story hotel on Main Street. The changes also included the reduction of the parking garage by one floor and the market-rate apartments being moved off-site.

MGM has pledged to create about 3,000 permanent jobs to benefit the local community. The company announced that it would have various job descriptions available, including security officer, assistant executive housekeeper, food and beverage manager, host person, 21 dealer, concierge, assistant front desk manager, front desk clerk, and housekeeper, a spokeswoman gave as some examples.

MGM Springfield opened to the public on August 24, 2018. The $960,000,000 project is built in an area that sustained significant damage by a tornado that struck Springfield on June 1, 2011. The 2-million-square-foot (190,000 m^{2}) complex contains a gaming area surrounded by a parking garage, hotel, spa, movie theater, restaurants, and shops. The 125,000-square-foot (11,600 m^{2}) casino features 2,550 slots, 120 table games, a high-limit room, and a poker room with 23 tables.

In 2021, MGM Resorts agreed to sell the land and buildings of MGM Springfield to MGM Growth Properties for $400 million. MGM Resorts would lease back the property and continue to operate it, paying initial rent of $30 million per year.

== Features ==
=== Attractions and venues ===
- Commonwealth Bar and Lounge (nightclub)
- Costa (Italian)
- Guac This Way
- Lobby Bar
- Luxxe Spa
- Regal Cinemas
- South End Market
- TAP Sports Bar (sports bar w/ bowling alley), serving local beers, milkshakes, and burgers
- Top Golf Swing Suite
- The Chandler Steakhouse (steakhouse)
- The Knox Bar (nightclub)
- The Roasted Bean (cafe)
- Wahlburgers

==== Venues ====
- ARIA Ballroom
- Roar! Comedy Club
- Union House (planned, replacing TopGolf)

== See also ==
- Gambling in Massachusetts
