= River's Edge Arts Alliance =

Logo

The River's Edge Arts Alliance, also known as the Hudson Area Arts Alliance, was organized in 1990 and incorporated on March 7, 1991. The River's Edge Arts Alliance is a local, non-profit 501(c)(3) charitable organization promoting community arts, arts education and 'cultural enrichment'. The organization provides arts activities that appeal to a broad range of interests, age groups and backgrounds, offering visual and performing art, and arts activities. The River's Edge Arts Alliance presents musical performances, theater performances, art exhibits as well as offering education classes for children and adults in art, music and theater.

== Location ==
The River's Edge Arts Alliance Office is located in the Hudson Public Schools Administration Building at 155 Apsley Street in Hudson, Massachusetts.

== History ==
The concept of the River's Arts Alliance was developed in 1988 when local parents and teachers created an informal organization to increase cultural activities for school children and their families. The Community Arts Series was created in 1988, followed by the Drama Workshop summer program in 1989. The River's Edge Arts Alliance was formed the following year to manage the Arts Series and Drama Workshop. Visual art exhibits as well as a newsletter and arts calendar were developed.

Jan Patterson, a founding member of the River's Edge Arts Alliance, was hired as full-time executive director in 1993 through a grant from the Massachusetts Cultural Council. After school classes, area arts meetings and other programs were added, and the River's Edge Arts Alliance became increasingly known at the regional level. A program director was hired in 1998 with additional staff added in subsequent years. The After School Band Lesson Program was developed in 1997 and the Focus on Kids! Series in Marlborough in 1999. The following year the agency took over management of the Pro Musica Youth Chorus, now called the River's Edge Youth Chorus, and in 2002 the River's Edge Community Band was formed. Art in the Hall, a series of individual artist exhibits at Hudson Town Hall, was developed in December 2003. The River's Edge Chorale was formed in 2005, followed by the River's Edge Players in 2006.

Managed by a small staff, an active board of directors and volunteers, the Arts Alliance currently has 150 donors/sponsors and about 350 members from 35 area communities who are individuals, families, artists, organizations and businesses.

The River's Edge Arts Alliance offers a broad array of arts activities in which thousands of adults and children participate, often as families. The River's Edge Arts Alliance is responsible for creating and sustaining many cultural activities and organizations including: Art in the Hall, Arts After School, Arts in the Park, Community Arts Series, Focus on the Arts, Hudson Band Lesson Program, Hudson Pathways, River's Edge Youth Chorus, River's Edge Chorale, River's Edge Community Band, River's Edge Players, Saturday Morning Discovery Series, Summer Arts, Summer Drama Workshop (now in its 25th year) and many visual arts exhibits. These events, exhibits and classes are held in Hudson and surrounding towns. In addition to its regular programming in performing arts, visual arts and arts education, the agency has participated in many collaborative and partnership initiatives. Marlborough residents have participated in Arts Alliance programs since the beginning, and during the past thirteen years, the Arts Alliance has offered an increasing number of programs in the city.

Each year the River's Edge Arts Alliance sponsors events, exhibits and educational workshops in Marlborough and Hudson. It brought the Focus on the Arts Series (formerly named Focus on Kids) and Children's Theater Workshop performances. For ten years, the popular Family Fun Festivals (formerly called The Saturday Morning Discovery Series), a program managed by the River's Edge Arts Alliance for the City of Marlborough, has offered some of the region's performers presenting free performances on Union Common in the summer and at the Walker Building or Marlborough Senior Center in the winter.

The River's Arts Alliance's 20th anniversary was celebrated on January 16, 2010, with the "Taste of the Arts" Gala at the Hudson Public Library. The Hudson Selectmen's proclamation was read by Sonny Parente, and Senator Jamie Eldridge and Representative Kate Hogan offered recognition from the State House. Also on hand were a variety of musicians and visual artists who shared their work with the attendees as well as board members, staff and many community leaders and arts supporters.

The River's edge Arts Alliance continues to publish a quarterly newsletter and arts calendar and formerly provided the Guide to Culture and Community, its annual program book. It was estimated in 2010 that more than 23,000 people benefited from the many performances, workshops, concerts, exhibits and other arts events the River's Edge Arts Alliance helped produce.

== Programs ==
The current programs offered are the River's Edge Chorale, River's Edge Community Band, River's Edge Youth Chorus, River's Edge Players, After School Band Lessons for the students of the Hudson Public Schools, Arts After School and Summer Drama Workshop.

== Management and volunteers ==
In January 2012, after the retirement of founder Jan Patterson, The River's Edge Arts Alliance Board of Directors hired Lynne Johnson, former Theater Education Director at the Huntington Theatre in Boston, MA, as the executive director. The River's Edge Arts Alliance is governed by an elected volunteer Board of Directors, run by a staff of one full-time and two part-time staff and consultants and supported by a volunteer staff of over 100 people. The River's Edge Arts Alliance relies on volunteers to staff events, marketing, operations and theater productions.
