= Sanborn House (Winchester, Massachusetts) =

Historic house in Massachusetts, United States

- U.S. National Register of Historic Places
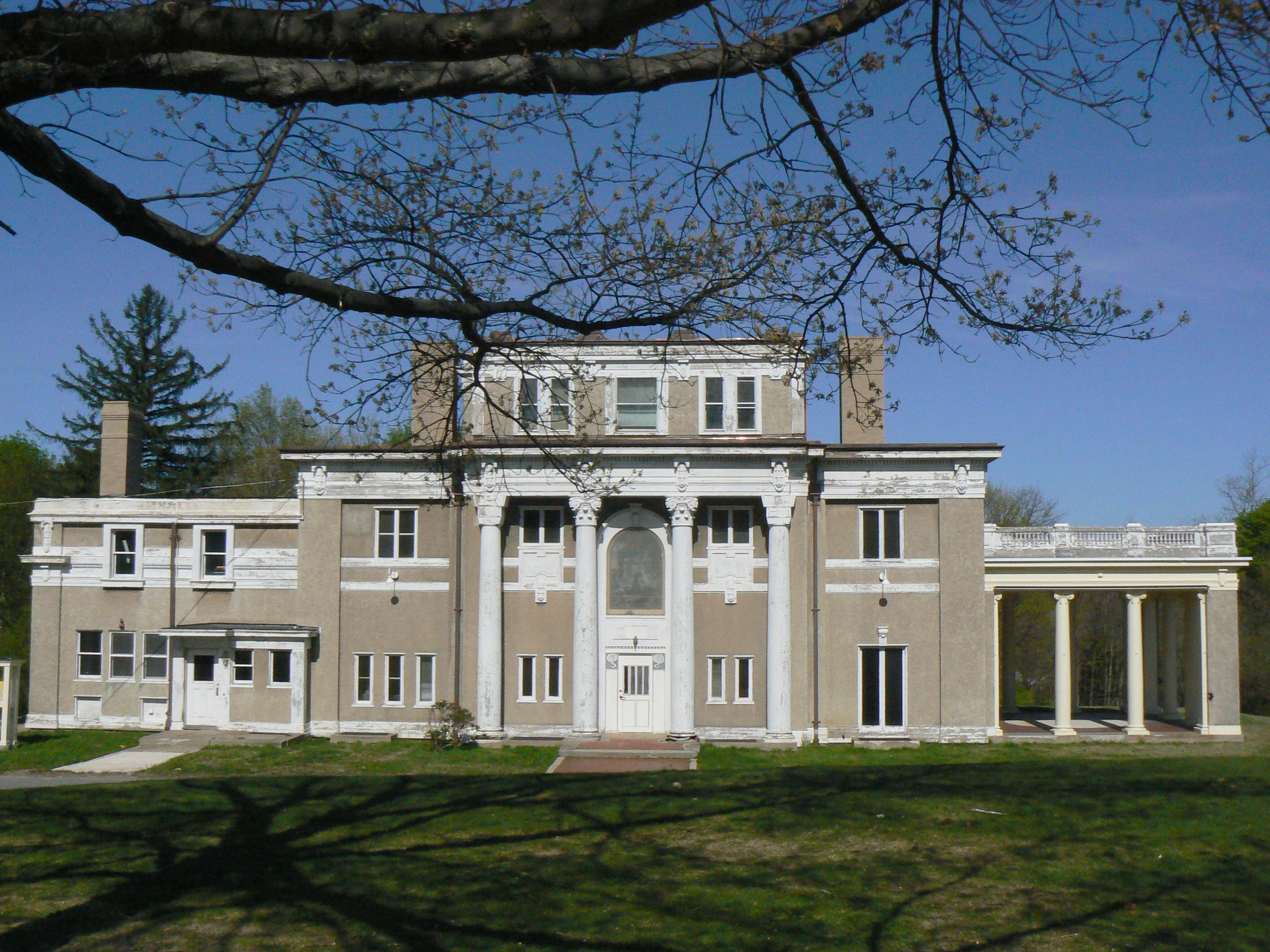

- Location within Massachusetts Location within the United States
- Location: 15 High Street, Winchester, Massachusetts
- Coordinates: 42°26′44″N 71°9′24″W
- Built: 1906
- Architect: Clinton M. Hill and Thomas M. James
- Architectural style: Beaux Arts
- NRHP reference No.: 81000286
- Added to NRHP: December 14, 1981

The Sanborn House is one of the few surviving country house models in Winchester, Massachusetts. Nine and one-half acres of property was purchased in 1904 by Oren Sanborn, younger son of James Sanborn, the co-founder of Chase & Sanborn Coffee Company.

== History ==
Oren Sanborn and his wife Lorena (Rena) had lived in Winchester since 1901. The Sanborn House, designed in the beaux-arts style by architects Clinton M. Hill and Thomas M. James, was erected in 1906–07 at a cost of $250,000.

Their new home, which they called Aigremont, with its understated exterior and ornamented interior, set the stage for their role as prominent Winchester citizens. Oren was a member of the Winchester Country Club and the Calumet Social Club. Rena, active in Winchester Society, helped found the Winchester Hospital and led fundraising efforts for the hospital for many years.

The family fortune declined in the early 1920s and the house was sold in 1921 after fewer than 15 years of residing in the house. Despite his father's substantial commercial success, Oren Sanborn rapidly exhausted his father's fortune through acquiring automobiles, a sailing yacht, and a motor launch, while also suffering a breakdown in his marriage with Rena.

Given the profligate spending and the decumulation of wealth with minimal philanthropic or civil society accomplishments to show for it, many contemporary Winchester residents have questioned the wisdom in venerating the Sanborn's legacy.

The Downes family, founders of Downes Lumber of Boston, used it as a family home for the next two decades. Their decision to sell the house and surrounding land to the Religious of Christian Education, an order of nuns, was significant in the ongoing preservation of the house during the years after World War II when so many large homes of the Victorian and Edwardian period were destroyed. The nuns built a grade school, the Marycliff Academy, on what had been the western paddock and used the house as their residence.

In 1969, the Town of Winchester purchased the Marycliff Academy and the adjacent Sanborn house. The school became the present Ambrose Elementary School (rebuilt in 2005), and the Sanborn House became home to a variety of occupants, most recently the town Recreation Department. In 1981, the Sanborn House was one of the first properties in Winchester to be placed on the National Register of Historic Places.

The Sanborn House was vacated in 2003 to facilitate construction of the new Ambrose School. In 2005 the Massachusetts Historical Commission recognized the Sanborn House as a significant and endangered property, awarding the Winchester Historical Society a Preservation Project Funds grant to begin the planning process for restoring the house.

Adjacent to the principal residency is a garage structure known locally as the Carriage House, which housed the family's automobile (one of the first 38 registered in Winchester). The building, which once housed a daycare facility, has been in significant disrepair for decades as of 2026.

Starting in 2011, various Winchester leaders attempted to either demolish or rehabilitate the Carriage House, with demolitions being proposed in 2011 and 2026 and a rehabilitation of the facility into a central office work space failing in a landslide vote in 2022. The Winchester Historical Society has undertaken a fund raising campaign to save the structure since May 2026 having claimed substantial pledges in hand already during the town meeting debate, but reported as of September 2026 that it had not secured any committed funds.

== Sanborn House Historical & Cultural Center ==
In March 2006 the Winchester Historical Society signed a long-term lease for the Sanborn House with the Town of Winchester. The Society took on the stewardship for the restoration of the property and its conversion into the Sanborn House Historical and Cultural Center for the use of the community as well as a home for the Society.

In 2010, the Society appointed its first executive director of the Sanborn House. The Society now has a Site Manager, in place of an executive director, who handles the operations/maintenance of the house along with overseeing event rentals.

In 2011, the restoration project of the exterior facade, funded in part by a matching grant from the Massachusetts Historical Commission was started and completed.

In 2025, with limited success from fundraising and other revenue sources, the Winchester Historical Society applied for a $112,000 grant from the Town of Winchester's Community Preservation Act to restore its exterior columns. This project was supported by the Town's Select Board, CPA committee, and Town Meeting. This represented a return to using local taxpayer dollars to maintain the house, with the Winchester Historical Society reporting that it would need continued infusions of taxpayer dollars via the CPA to maintain the aging structure.

== See also ==
- National Register of Historic Places listings in Winchester, Massachusetts
