= Main Street Historic District (Woonsocket, Rhode Island) =

Historic district in Rhode Island, United States

- U.S. National Register of Historic Places
- U.S. Historic district
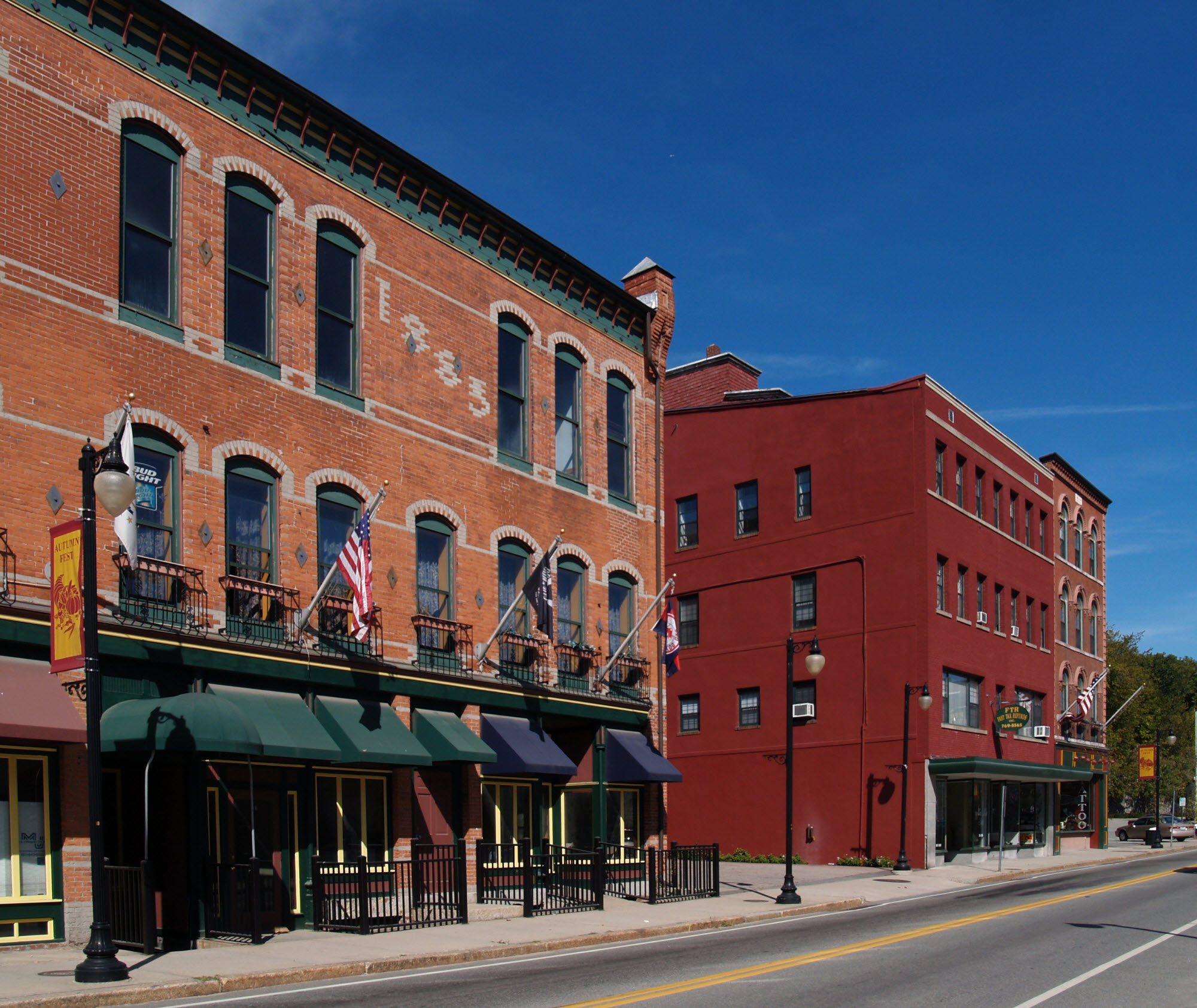

- Location within Rhode Island Location within the United States
- Location: Woonsocket, Rhode Island
- Coordinates: 42.003°N 71.5142°W
- Built: 1853
- Architect: Multiple
- Architectural style: Classical Revival, Second Empire, Italianate
- MPS: Woonsocket MRA
- NRHP reference No.: 91000461
- Added to NRHP: April 18, 1991

The Main Street Historic District is a historic district in the central business district of Woonsocket, Rhode Island, USA. It extends along Main Street, between the railroad tracks just northeast of its junction with Clinton Street, and roughly Ascension Street at the southwest. Most of the sixteen buildings in this area were built at the height of Woonsocket's prosperity, roughly between 1850 and 1930. The district is characterized by brick and masonry buildings generally between two and six stories in height.

The district was listed on the National Register of Historic Places in 1991. It includes two properties previously listed on the National Register: Woonsocket City Hall, and the conjoined Honan's Block and 112-114 Main Street.

== See also ==
- National Register of Historic Places listings in Providence County, Rhode Island
