= Rockland Trust =

Commercial bank in Massachusetts, U.S.

- Type: Subsidiary
- Industry: Banking
- Founded: September 1907; 119 years ago
- Headquarters: Rockland, Massachusetts, U.S.
- Key people: Jeffrey Tengel (CEO)
- Total assets: US$ 20 billion (2021)
- Number of employees: 1,100+ (2021)
- Parent: Independent Bank Corp. (Nasdaq: INDB)
- Website: www.rocklandtrust.com

Rockland Trust is a commercial bank based in Rockland, Massachusetts that serves Southeastern Massachusetts, Coastal Massachusetts, Cape Cod, and Boston's MetroWest. Established in 1907 as Rockland Trust Company. A wholly owned subsidiary of Independent Bank Corp., by October 2016, Rockland Trust had $7.5 billion in assets and employed around 1,000 people. By April 2022, Rockland Trust had $20 billion in assets and employed around 1,100 people.

== History ==
=== 1907-2000 ===
The Rockland Trust Company was organized in September 1907 in the Boston suburb of Rockland, Massachusetts. As of September 30, 1907, bank resources were recorded by the Massachusetts Bank Commissioner at $317,852.52, and by December 3, 1907, were at $484,907.48. By September 23, 1908, resources were at $553,430.25. By June 23, 1909, they were at $645,430.87. At the last election, Rockland Trust Company's executive committee chairman, Horace T. Fogg, was elected "almost without opposition" to the office of Treasurer of Plymouth County.

In 1910, Rockland Trust began offering "Automobile Banking" — an innovative program that offered banking services to nearby towns (including Hull, Massachusetts) from the window of a special adapted car. The program was well received and continued through 1955.

Rockland Trust's 1927 petition to open a branch in Hull, Massachusetts sparked a state-level debate on whether to allow "kangaroo banking," where banks opened branches in non-adjacent towns. The proposal was opposed by Alvan T. Fuller, then Governor of Massachusetts, and Hingham Trust, a bank based closer to Hull. The petition was finally granted by the Massachusetts legislature.

=== 2001-2018 ===
The bank instigated a "buying spree" of other financial companies in 2008, acquiring Slades Ferry Bank that year. In 2009, its acquisition of Benjamin Franklin Bank brought Rockland into the western suburbs of Boston for the first time. The Central Bank purchase in 2012 brought Rockland to have branches north of Boston. The bank was planning further expansion in 2012. In 2015, the bank was named the No. 1 largest company by the Boston Globe in its "2015 Top Places To Work" feature. In 2015, it was reported that Rockland Trust had secured its first branches in Boston, with the $131 million acquisition of Peoples Federal Savings Bank's holding company. Although Rockland already had a commercial lending and wealth management office in Boston, it had no retail locations prior, with 8 branches added to Rockland's 78 branch network. Between 2005 and October 2016, the bank grew to have 85 branches in eastern Massachusetts and Rhode Island, and acquired Slades Ferry Bancorp, Benjamin Franklin Bank, Central Bank, Mayflower Bank and Peoples Federal Savings Bank. The largest of those acquisitions was Benjamin Franklin, which had near $1 billion in assets.

By October 2016, Rockland Trust was wholly owned by Independent Bank Corp and had $7.5 billion in assets. It also employed around 1,000 people, and had a loan limit of $100 million. That month, the company acquired the Bank of Cape Cod. It had plans to begin offering wealth management services through its wealth management division. On October 20, 2016, it was reported that Rockland Trust Company would acquire Edgartown National Bank, with the merger expected to be complete by May 2017. The transaction was valued at about $24.5 million, according to the Vineyard Gazette. After the merger was finalized, it was reported the name of the Edgartown National Bank would change to Rockland Trust.

In 2017, CEO Chris Oddleifson was quoted saying that they would consider acquiring banks with as much as $3 billion to $4 billion assets. At the time, Rockland Trust had about $7.7 billion in assets. As of February 2018, Chris Oddleifson was CEO of Rockland Trust.

=== 2021 ===
In April 2021 Rockland Trust Company announced its acquisition of East Boston Savings Bank for $1.15 billion. Following this acquisition Rockland Trust total assets were estimated at $20 billion.

== Services and branches ==
The company continues to operate as a subsidiary of Independent Bank Corp, and remains based in Rockland, Massachusetts with branches in the state and Rhode Island. Corporate headquarters are in Hanover, Massachusetts. It has retail branches, commercial lending offices, investment management offices, and residential lending centers located in Eastern Massachusetts and Rhode Island. By October 2016, Rockland Trust employed around 1,000 people and had 85 branches.

Rockland Trust offers banking, investment, and insurance services to businesses and individuals.

== Notable acquisitions ==
- 1992 - Middleboro Trust Company
- 2000 - Four Sovereign Bank branches
- 2004 - Falmouth Cooperative Bank
- 2008 - Slades Ferry Trust Company
- 2009 - Benjamin Franklin Bank
- 2012 - Central Bank
- 2013 - Mayflower Bank
- 2015 - People's Federal Savings Bank
- 2016 - New England Bancorp, Inc., parent of Bank of Cape Cod
- 2017 - Island Bancorp, Inc., parent of Edgartown National Bank
- 2018 - Milford National Bank and Trust Company
- 2019 - Blue Hills Bank
- 2021 - East Boston Savings Bank

== Images ==
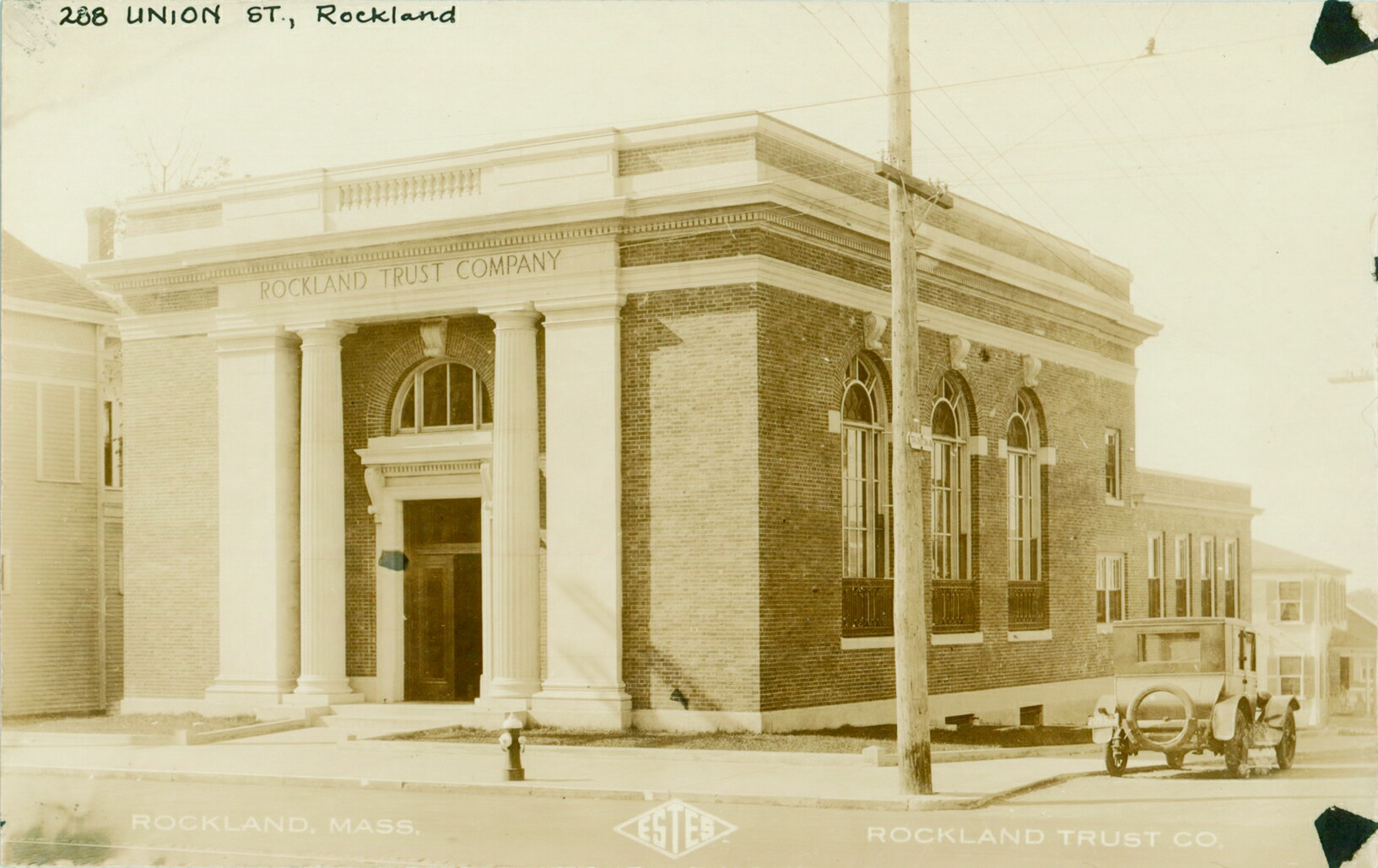
1924: after first set of renovations, including a large addition in the back

== See also ==
- Rockland Trust Company (building)
