= National Register of Historic Places listings in Woonsocket, Rhode Island =

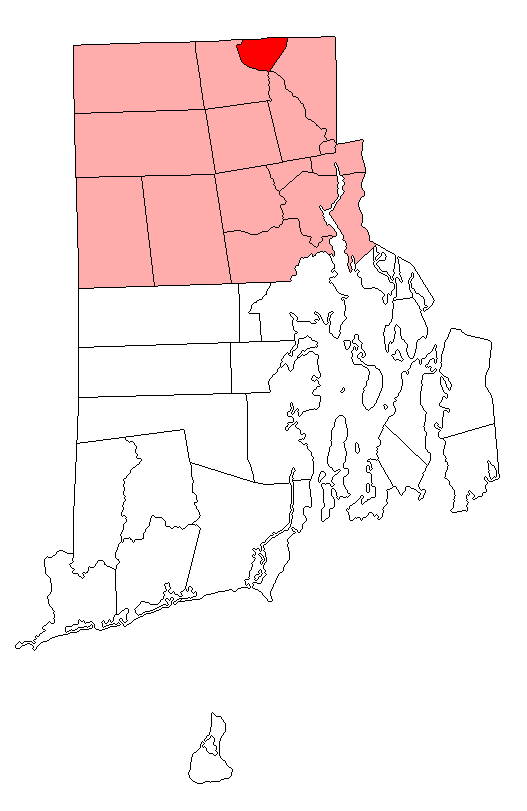
Location of Woonsocket in Providence County, Rhode Island

This is a list of National Register of Historic Places listings in Woonsocket, Rhode Island.

Included in the list are all properties and districts on the National Register of Historic Places in the city of Woonsocket, Rhode Island, United States. Woonsocket is home to 44 of the more than 400 properties and districts listed in Providence County. Properties and districts located in the county's other municipalities are listed separately. One Woonsocket listing, the Blackstone Canal, extends into other parts of Providence County, and appears on multiple lists. There is also one former listing.

Contents: Counties in Rhode Island

Bristol | Kent | Newport | Providence (Pawtucket | Providence (city) | Woonsocket) | Washington

This National Park Service list is complete through NPS recent listings posted May 1, 2026.

	Name on the Register	Image	Date listed	Location	Description
1	1761 Milestone	1761 Milestone	November 24, 1982 (#82000131)	640 S. Main St. 41°59′22″N 71°31′54″W	
2	Allen Street Historic District	Allen Street Historic District	September 13, 1990 (#90001349)	Allen St. 42°00′06″N 71°30′50″W	
3	John Arnold House	John Arnold House	November 24, 1982 (#82000132)	99 Providence St. 41°59′41″N 71°31′22″W	
4	Bernon Worsted Mill	Bernon Worsted Mill	June 10, 2005 (#05000585)	828 Park Ave. 41°59′38″N 71°30′50″W	
5	Blackstone Canal	Blackstone Canal	May 6, 1971 (#91001536)	From Steeple and Promenade Sts. in Providence to the Massachusetts border in North Smithfield; 41°55′16″N 71°25′21″W	Initial listing extended from Providence, through Pawtucket, and as far north as Lincoln; a 1991 expansion (#91001536) extended it to the state line; the canal itself extended into Worcester County, Massachusetts, where it is the subject of separate listings.
6	Cato Hill Historic District	Cato Hill Historic District	August 10, 1976 (#76002255)	Bounded by Main, Railroad, Arnold and Blackstone Streets, including portions of Cato, Church, Boyden, and all of Clarkin Lane and Cato Lane; 42°00′18″N 71°30′54″W	
7	Henry Darling House	Henry Darling House	November 26, 1982 (#82000136)	786 Harris Ave. 42°00′50″N 71°31′40″W	
8	Federal Street Historic District		October 9, 2024 (#100010921)	122, 142 & 160 Clinton Street and 1, 43, & 77 Federal Street; 42°00′18″N 71°30′42″W	
9	First Universalist Church		March 27, 2020 (#100005156)	78 Earle St. 42°00′27″N 71°30′44″W	
10	French Worsted Company Mill Historic District	French Worsted Company Mill Historic District	May 21, 2008 (#08000453)	153 Hamlet Ave. 42°00′10″N 71°30′00″W	Demolished in 2011.
11	Alphonse Gaulin Jr. House	Alphonse Gaulin Jr. House	November 24, 1982 (#82000137)	311 Elm St. 42°00′25″N 71°29′55″W	
12	Glenark Mills	Glenark Mills	May 15, 1989 (#89000409)	64 East St. 41°59′54″N 71°31′09″W	
13	Grove Street Elementary School	Grove Street Elementary School	November 24, 1982 (#82000138)	312 Grove St. 41°59′54″N 71°30′33″W	
14	Hanora Mills	Hanora Mills	November 24, 1982 (#82000139)	1 Main St. 42°00′02″N 71°30′58″W	
15	Harris Warehouse	Harris Warehouse	July 1, 1976 (#76000047)	61 Railroad St. 42°00′14″N 71°30′54″W	
16	Honan's Block and 112-114 Main Street	Honan's Block and 112-114 Main Street	August 3, 1989 (#89000941)	110-114 Main St. 42°00′08″N 71°30′53″W	
17	Hope Street School	Hope Street School	April 14, 2000 (#00000383)	40 Hope St. 41°59′57″N 71°31′13″W	
18	Island Place Historic District	Island Place Historic District	September 13, 1990 (#90001348)	Island Place and S. Main St. at Market Sq. 41°59′57″N 71°30′59″W	
19	Jenckes Mansion	Jenckes Mansion	November 24, 1982 (#82000140)	837-839 Social St. 42°00′44″N 71°30′07″W	
20	Jules Desurmont Worsted Company Mill	Jules Desurmont Worsted Company Mill	January 12, 2007 (#06001257)	84 Fairmount St. 42°00′09″N 71°31′21″W	
21	L'Eglise du Precieux Sang	L'Eglise du Precieux Sang	July 26, 1982 (#82000142)	94 Carrington Ave. and 61 Park Ave. 42°00′06″N 71°30′33″W	
22	L'Union Saint Jean-Baptist d' Amerique	L'Union Saint Jean-Baptist d' Amerique	March 12, 2018 (#100002194)	1 Social St. 42°00′21″N 71°30′43″W	
23	Lafayette Worsted Company Administrative Headquarters Historic District	Lafayette Worsted Company Administrative Headquarters Historic District	August 7, 2017 (#100001439)	134 & 148 Hamlet Ave. 42°00′08″N 71°30′04″W	
24	Linton Block	Linton Block	November 24, 1982 (#82000143)	3-5 Monument Sq. 42°00′19″N 71°30′48″W	Destroyed by fire in 2000.
25	Logee House	Logee House	November 24, 1982 (#82000001)	225 Logee St. 41°59′41″N 71°30′43″W	
26	Main Street Historic District	Main Street Historic District	April 18, 1991 (#91000461)	Roughly Main St. east of Market Sq. to Depot Sq. 42°00′09″N 71°30′52″W	
27	North End Historic District	North End Historic District	November 24, 1982 (#82000002)	Roughly bounded by Verry, Highland, Winter, and Summer Sts. 42°00′31″N 71°31′15″W	
28	Philmont Worsted Company Mill	Philmont Worsted Company Mill	April 19, 2006 (#06000296)	685 Social St. 42°00′38″N 71°30′07″W	
29	Pothier House	Pothier House	November 24, 1982 (#82000003)	172 Pond St. 42°00′27″N 71°30′42″W	
30	St. Andrews Episcopal Chapel	St. Andrews Episcopal Chapel	November 24, 1982 (#82000005)	576 Fairmont St. 42°00′03″N 71°31′54″W	
31	St. Ann's Church Complex	St. Ann's Church Complex	November 24, 1982 (#82000006)	Cumberland and Elm Sts. and Gaulin Ave. 42°00′27″N 71°30′08″W	
32	St. Charles Borromeo Church Complex	St. Charles Borromeo Church Complex	February 24, 1983 (#83000003)	N. Main, Daniels, and Earle Sts. 42°00′29″N 71°30′52″W	
33	Smith-Ballou House	Smith-Ballou House	June 6, 2003 (#03000184)	641 Harris Avenue; 42°00′45″N 71°31′28″W	
34	Smithfield Friends Meeting House, Parsonage & Cemetery	Smithfield Friends Meeting House, Parsonage & Cemetery	November 24, 1982 (#82000008)	126 Smithfield Rd. 41°59′21″N 71°31′49″W	
35	South Main Street Historic District	South Main Street Historic District	November 24, 1982 (#82000009)	Roughly bounded by Mason, Coe, Andrews St., and Bernice Ave. 41°59′37″N 71°31′35″W	
36	Stadium Building	Stadium Building	June 30, 1976 (#76000006)	329 Main St. 42°00′19″N 71°30′46″W	
37	U.S. Post Office	U.S. Post Office	May 30, 1979 (#79003774)	295 Main St. 42°00′17″N 71°30′46″W	Now part of YMCA
38	Frank Wilbur House	Frank Wilbur House	November 24, 1982 (#82000012)	1273 Park Ave. 41°59′08″N 71°30′59″W	
39	Woonsocket City Hall	Woonsocket City Hall	May 1, 1974 (#74000007)	169 Main St. 42°00′08″N 71°30′53″W	
40	Woonsocket Civil War Monument	Woonsocket Civil War Monument	November 24, 1982 (#82000013)	Monument Sq. 42°00′19″N 71°30′47″W	
41	Woonsocket Company Mill Complex	Woonsocket Company Mill Complex	May 7, 1973 (#73000005)	100-115 Front St. 42°00′05″N 71°30′46″W	
42	Woonsocket District Courthouse	Woonsocket District Courthouse	November 24, 1982 (#82000014)	24 Front St. 42°00′06″N 71°30′39″W	
43	Woonsocket Rubber Company Mill	Woonsocket Rubber Company Mill	May 1, 1989 (#89000334)	60-82 S. Main St. 42°00′00″N 71°31′02″W	
44	Woonsocket Senior High and Junior High Schools	Woonsocket Senior High and Junior High Schools	November 6, 2017 (#100001780)	357 Park Place; 42°00′15″N 71°30′16″W	

== Former listing ==
	Name on the Register	Image	Date listed	Date removed	Location	Description
1	Woonsocket Opera House		April 24, 1973 (#73002266)	July 22, 1976	37-41-45 N. Main St.	Also known as the Park Theatre. Destroyed by fire September 22, 1975.

== See also ==
- National Register of Historic Places listings in Providence County, Rhode Island
- List of National Historic Landmarks in Rhode Island
