= First Universalist Church (Woonsocket, Rhode Island) =

Historic church in Rhode Island, United States

- U.S. National Register of Historic Places
- Location within Rhode Island Location within the United States
- Location: 78 Earle St., Woonsocket, Rhode Island
- Coordinates: 42°0′27″N 71°30′44″W
- Area: 0.35 acres (0.14 ha)
- Built: 1924
- Architect: Gorham Henshaw
- Architectural style: Gothic Revival
- NRHP reference No.: 100005156
- Added to NRHP: March 27, 2020

The First Universalist Church is a former Universalist church at 78 Earle Street in Woonsocket, Rhode Island. Built in 1924 and enlarged in 1957, it is a good example of 20th-century Gothic Revival architecture. The congregation for which it was built was established in the 1820s, in part through the efforts of Hosea Ballou, an influential early Universalist minister who also had business interests in Woonsocket. The congregation was disbanded in 2007, and the building now houses the American-French Genealogical Society. It was listed on the National Register of Historic Places in 2020.

== Description and history ==
Woonsocket's former First Universalist Church stands a short way north of downtown Woonsocket, on a small parcel of land at the western corner of Shaw and Earle Streets. Its front section, the original 1924 church, is a two-story Gothic structure built out of buff brick, and set with its long access parallel to Shaw Street, with an ornate main entrance facing Earle Street. Extending along the Earle Street alignment is the single-story 1957 addition, which is separated from the original structure by a square tower, also built in 1957.

The history of Universalism in Woonsocket is entwined with the life of Hosea Ballou, one of the most influential figures in the rise of the denomination in the early 19th century. Ballou, a native of New Hampshire, preached widely across New England, and founded what became known as the Hanora Mills in 1828. Universalist groups began meeting in mill space around that time, and the first edifice of the First Universalist Church was constructed on Church and Main Streets in 1840. Its first minister, John Boyden, was a disciple of Hosea Ballou. The congregation grew in size, and construction of the present building in 1924 enabled further growth. The 1957 addition, Modernist in its design, was designed by Boston architect Arland A. Dirlam. The congregation declined over subsequent decades, and was disbanded in 2007. The building has since been acquired by the American-French Genealogical Society for its headquarters. The building is the last surviving reminder of the city's Universalist history.

== See also ==
- National Register of Historic Places listings in Providence County, Rhode Island
