= Historic mill villages of Woonsocket =

List of villages in Rhode Island, U.S.

The city of Woonsocket in the U.S. state of Rhode Island was established as a union of six mill villages along the Blackstone River. These villages are described in more detail below.

- Woonsocket Falls Village was founded in the 1820s, taking up much of the area around Market Square. Entrepreneurs built many factories in the area which were powered by Blackstone River water flowing to the factories from hand-dug trenches.
- Social Village was the site of the city's first textile mill. In 1810 Ariel, Abner and Nathan Ballou, Eber Barlett, Job and Luke Jenckes, Oliver Leland and Joseph Arnold started the Social Manufacturing Company manufacturing cotton thread in a small wooden mill on the Mill River near Social Street. Eventually, the Social Mill, Nourse Mill and American Wringer Company were built in the area.
- Jenckesville was founded 1822 by Job and Luke Jenckes when they sold their interest in the Social Manufacturing Company and constructed Woonsocket's first stone mill at 96 Mill Street.
- Hamlet Village was founded 1815 by General Edward Carrington, a creator of the Blackstone Canal. Carrington built a textile mill near Hamlet Avenue and Davidson Street.
- Globe Village was named after the Globe Mill located within it. Thomas Arnold, Thomas Paine and Marcel Shove started the Globe Manufacturing Company in 1827 which went bankrupt two years later, and was acquired by George Ballou in 1864 who built a new state-of-the-art textile mill in 1873. The Social Manufacturing Company bought Ballou's complex after his death, and the company operated the mill until "it was acquired by the Manville-Jenckes Company in the early 1900s. Manville-Jenckes operated the mill until 1927 when it was closed. The mill buildings were demolished in the 1940s but employee housing on Front and Lincoln Street still remains." Globe Park remains a popular recreation area.
- Bernon (originally Danville) was founded in 1827 by the Russell Manufacturing Company, which built a stone mill in the area. In 1832, Sullivan Dorr (father of Thomas Wilson Dorr) and Crawford Allen of Providence bought the Russell Manufacturing Company and formed the Woonsocket Mill Company and renamed the village Bernon. In 1833, Dorr and Allen built the Bernon Worsted Mill. Eventually, the site became the property of the Blackstone Valley Gas and Electric.

== References and external links ==
- Woonsocket Village info
- History of Providence County Rhode Island edited by Richard M. Bayles and published by W. W. Peston & Co., New York, 1891
- Images of America – Woonsocket written by Robert R. Bellerose and published by Arcadia Publishing, Dover, NH, 1997.
- Old Woonsocket – erastus & doc written by Alton Pickering Thomas, MD and published by Mowbray Company of Providence, RI in 1973.
- Statewide Historic Preservation Report for Woonsocket, Rhode Island published by the Rhode Island Historic Preservation Commission in September, 1976.
- Woonsocket, Rhode Island – A Centennial History 1888 - 1988 published by the Woonsocket Centennial Committee in 1988.
- Woonsocket – Highlights of History 1800-1976 written by Alton Pickering Thomas, MD and published by the Woonsocket Opera House Society in 1973.
