= United States Post Office (Woonsocket, Rhode Island) =

- U.S. Post Office
- U.S. National Register of Historic Places
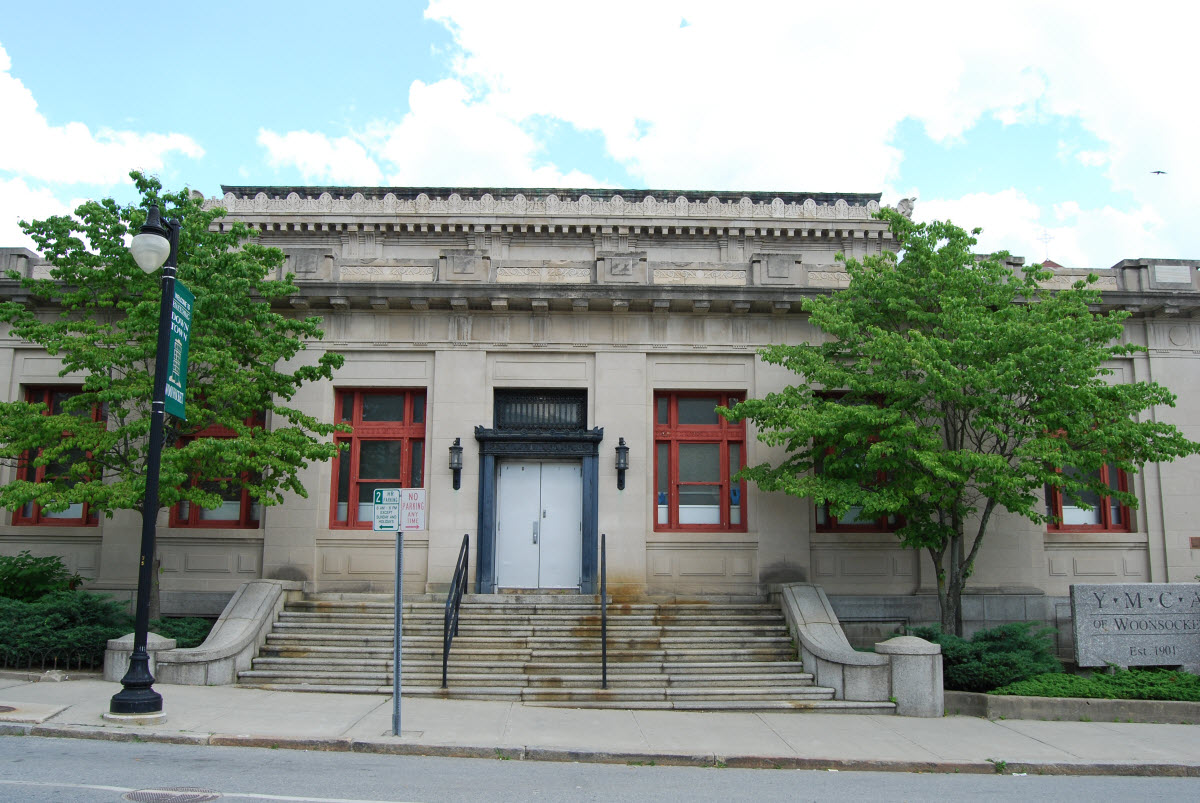

- Location within Rhode Island Location within the United States
- Location: Woonsocket, Rhode Island
- Coordinates: 42°0′17″N 71°30′46″W
- Built: 1910
- Architect: Louis Wetmore; J. K. Taylor
- Architectural style: Beaux Arts
- NRHP reference No.: 79003774
- Added to NRHP: May 30, 1979

The U.S. Post Office (now known as the Woonsocket YMCA) is a historic former post office building at 295 Main Street in Woonsocket, Rhode Island. The single-story masonry building was built 1910-12 and served as Woonsocket's main post office until 1975.

The building was added to the National Register of Historic Places in 1979. It is now part of the Woonsocket YMCA.

== See also ==
- National Register of Historic Places listings in Providence County, Rhode Island
