= Lafayette Worsted Company Administrative Headquarters Historic District =

- U.S. National Register of Historic Places
- U.S. Historic district
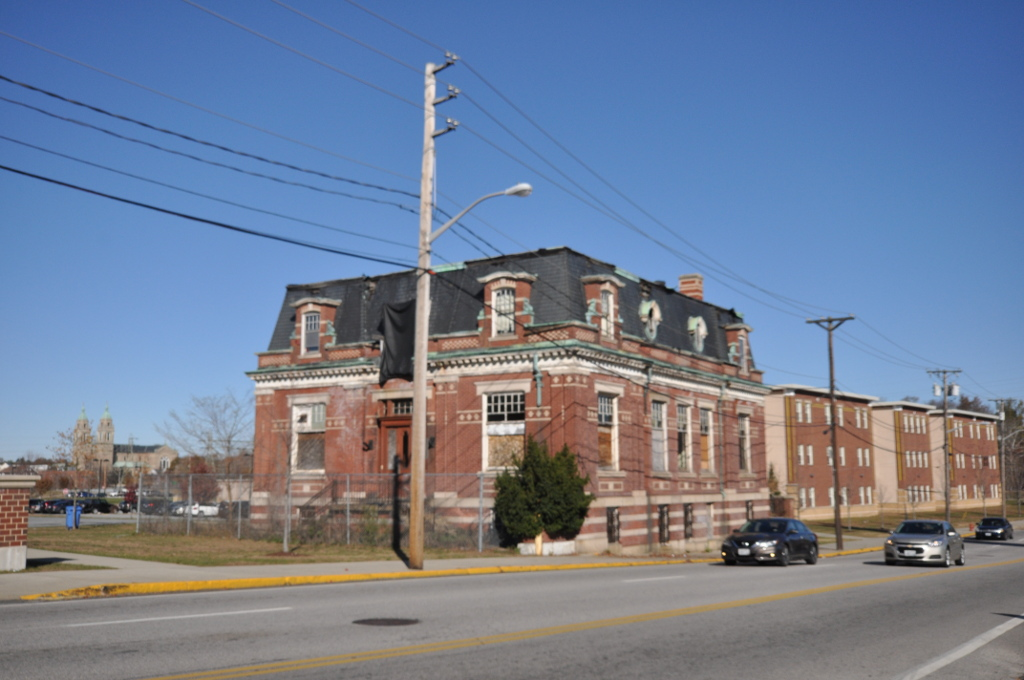

- Location within Rhode Island Location within the United States
- Location: 134 & 148 Hamlet Ave., Woonsocket, Rhode Island
- Coordinates: 42°0′8″N 71°30′4″W
- Area: 1.5 acres (0.61 ha)
- Built: c. 1920; 1923
- Architectural style: Second Empire; Georgian Revival
- NRHP reference No.: 100001439
- Added to NRHP: August 7, 2017

The Lafayette Worsted Company Administrative Headquarters Historic District encompasses the two surviving buildings of a once-extensive textile mill complex in Woonsocket, Rhode Island. Located near the Woonsocket Middle School on Hamlet Avenue are a former guest house, built about 1920, and the mill's 1923 administration building, an elaborate Second Empire brick building designed by Woonsocket architect Walter F. Fontaine. The Lafayette Worsted Mill, established in 1900, was one of three major local mills engaged in the French style of worsted wool production. Most of its buildings were demolished in 2008.

The district was listed on the National Register of Historic Places in 2017.

== See also ==
- National Register of Historic Places listings in Providence County, Rhode Island
