= Smith–Ballou House =

Historic house in Rhode Island, United States

- U.S. National Register of Historic Places
- The north face of the Smith–Ballou House in 2003

- Location within Rhode Island Location within the United States
- Location: Woonsocket, Rhode Island
- Coordinates: 42°0′45″N 71°31′28″W
- Area: 2 acres (0.81 ha)
- Built: 1906
- Architectural style: Queen Anne, Bungalow/Craftsman
- NRHP reference No.: 03000184
- Added to NRHP: June 06, 2003

The Smith–Ballou House is an historic house at 641 Harris Avenue in northwestern Woonsocket, Rhode Island. The 1906 house is listed on the National Register of Historic Places.

== History ==
The Smith–Ballou House was constructed in 1906 for two elderly sisters, Mary F. Smith (née Ballou) and Sarah J. Ballou. This 5,000-square-foot (460 m^{2}), three-story house combines Queen Anne and Arts & Crafts style influences, and retains a high degree of integrity of both design and materials. In the first 100 years, the house was owned and occupied by five families. The house initially stood on 5 acres (20,000 m^{2}) of land, subdivided in 1938 such that the house now stands on approximately two acres.

The house was surrounded by Norway Spruce and Blue Spruce trees. One of the trees was removed in 2007 due to infestation; a ring count confirmed that the tree was of the same age as the house. Only one Blue Spruce remains, though new plantings will eventually result in a return of the original landscaping. Extensive restoration was conducted in the early 2000s including repointing of the three chimneys and the 19-inch-thick granite foundation, new copper and slate on roof structures, and re-leading of the stained glass windows.

The house immediately to the south of the Smith–Ballou House is one of only two on the block that predate this house; it was built by Mary F. Smith's son (and Sarah J. Ballou's nephew), Stanley G. Smith. The two homes occupy a prominent hilltop location; siting, orientation, and outdoor living spaces suggest that the house originally commanded extensive views overlooking the west and south.

The Smith–Ballou House was listed on the National Register of Historic Places in 2003. The original color of the house was black stained cedar shakes for the siding with white trim.

== See also ==
- North End Historic District (Woonsocket, Rhode Island), which the house is just outside
- National Register of Historic Places listings in Providence County, Rhode Island
