= L'Union Saint Jean-Baptist d'Amerique (Woonsocket, Rhode Island) =

- L'Union Saint Jean-Baptiste d'Amerique
- U.S. National Register of Historic Places
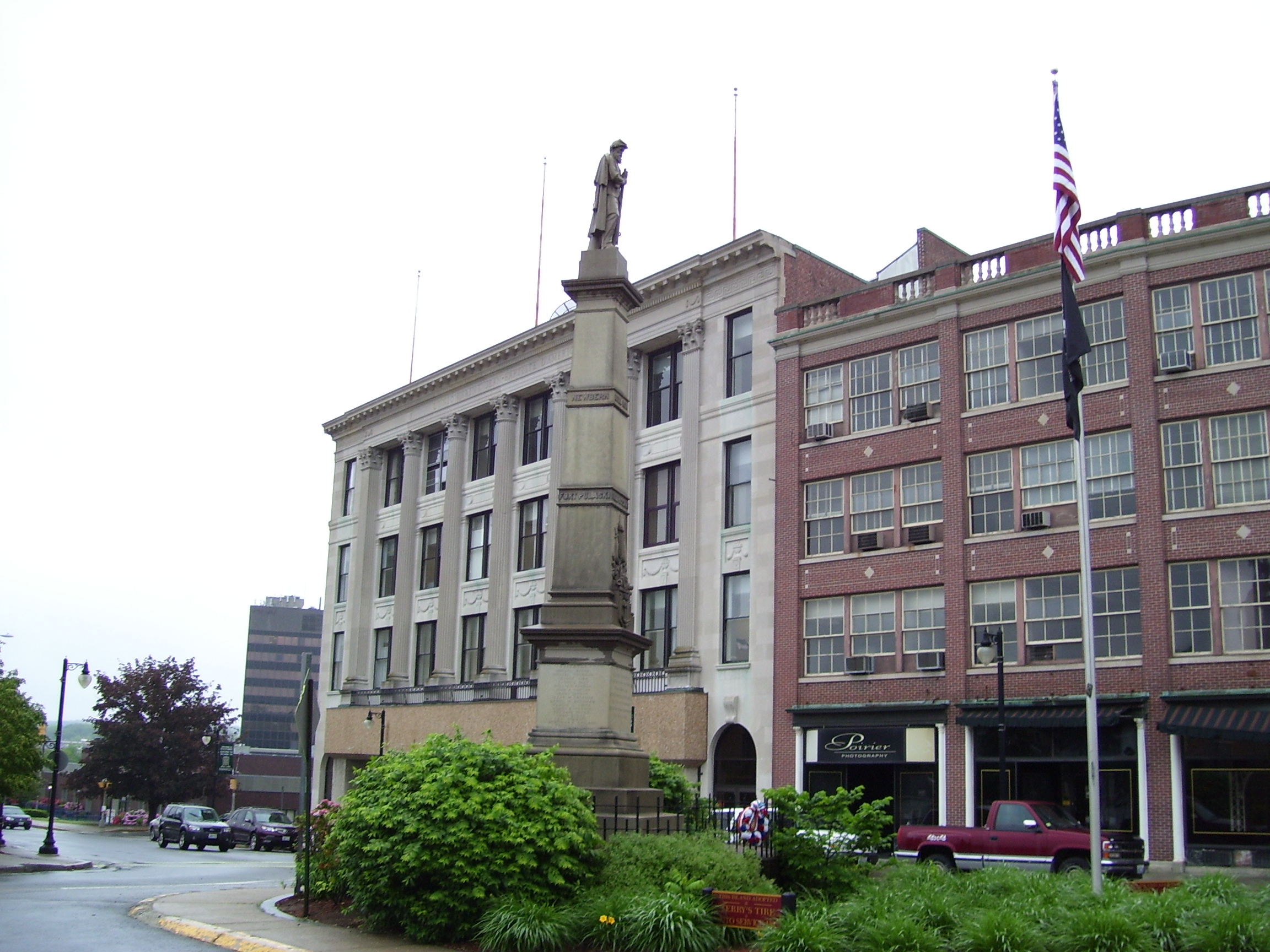
- Building directly behind the Civil War Memorial

- Location within Rhode Island Location within the United States
- Location: 1 Social St., Woonsocket, Rhode Island
- Coordinates: 42°0′21″N 71°30′43″W
- Area: less than one acre
- Built: 1926
- Architect: Walter F. Fontaine
- Architectural style: Classical Revival
- NRHP reference No.: 100002194
- Added to NRHP: March 12, 2018

The L'Union Saint Jean-Baptiste d'Amerique is a historic building at 1 Social Street in Woonsocket, Rhode Island. Built in 1926, it housed a fraternal benefit society for French Canadian Roman Catholic immigrants for many years, serving a significant immigrant population in the community. The building is also a prominent example of Classical Revival architecture, designed by a French Canadian immigrant architect, Walter F. Fontaine. The building was listed on the National Register of Historic Places in 2018.

== Description and history ==
The L'Union Saint Jean-Baptist d'Amerique building occupies a prominent site at the northern end of Woonsocket's Monument Square, at the southern corner of Social and Worrall Streets. It is a four-story masonry structure, built mainly out of brick but with a limestone facade. The facade faces west toward Social Street and Monument Square, and is dominated by monumental Corinthian columns and pilasters that rise from the second floor to an entablature beneath the projecting cornice. It is eight bays wide, with the outermost bays housing single sash windows, and the inner ones consisting of paired sash windows recessed between the columns. Panels of garlanded stone separate the windows in the inner bays. The ground-floor storefronts have a modern exterior, which has been applied over the original pressed metal storefronts.

L'Union Saint-Jean-Baptiste d’Amerique (USJB) was founded in 1900 to serve a burgeoning French Canadian immigrant population in New England and the United States, drawn by the prospect of employment in the many textile mills. In Woonsocket, for example, by 1900 fully 60% of the city's population was of French Canadian extraction, and by 1920 it was among the most French cities in the country. The USJB was a national organization which provided a support network for French Canadians, particularly supporting the continuation of French Canadian language and culture; its official language was French, and its membership was required to be Roman Catholic. The organization was originally headquartered in a building on Clinton Street, and had this building erected as its headquarters in 1926. It maintained its headquarters here until 1991, when it merged with Catholic Family Life Insurance.

== See also ==
- National Register of Historic Places listings in Providence County, Rhode Island
