= Woonsocket Senior High and Junior High Schools =

- U.S. National Register of Historic Places
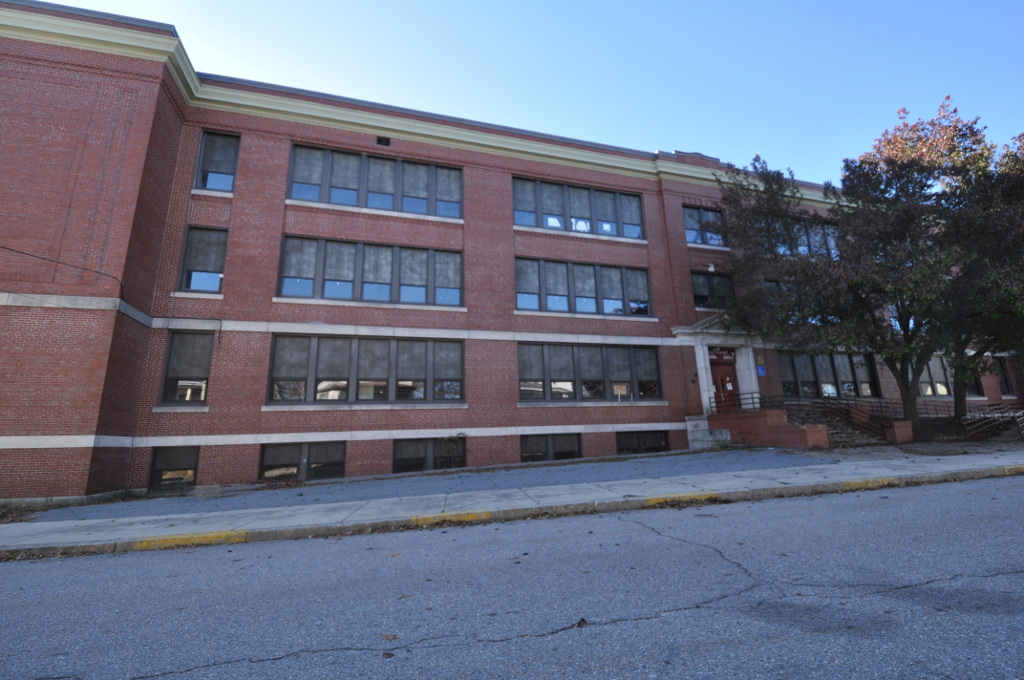
- Senior High School facade

- Location within Rhode Island Location within the United States
- Location: 357 Park Pl., Woonsocket, Rhode Island
- Coordinates: 42°0′15″N 71°30′16″W
- Built: 1914
- Architect: Classical Revival
- NRHP reference No.: 100001780
- Added to NRHP: November 6, 2017

The Woonsocket Senior High and Junior High Schools is a historic school complex at 357 Park Place in Woonsocket, Rhode Island. Built in 1914 and enlarged several times, it served as the city's high school until 1967, and as the Woonsocket Middle School until its closure in 2009. The building was listed on the National Register of Historic Places in 2017.

== Description and history ==
The former Woonsocket Senior High and Junior High Schools building is located in the city's Villa Nova neighborhood, south of the downtown, which is across the Blackstone River. It is a large E-shaped structure, present a long facade to the southeast, with wings extending to the northwest. The oldest portion of the building, its northeastern wing, was built in 1914 in the Classical Revival style, which was then continued in most of the subsequent additions and alterations to the building. An additional block of classrooms was added at the southern end of this wing in 1925, and the junior high school, an L-shaped structure, was added in 1927. At the center of the U shape created by these constructions is the 1952 Senior High School Gymnasium Annex. The most prominent entrance is that of the junior high school, facing southeast. It differs from the other construction in being mainly limestone, with four mammoth Doric pilasters supporting a wide lintel. The bays between the pilasters each house an entrance, above which are decorative panels incised (from left to right) with "Faith", "Hope", and "Charity".

Woonsocket was incorporated as a town in 1867 and as a city in 1888. Its first high school, built in 1877, was located on Boyden Street in a building that also housed elementary grades. In 1902, the high school took over the entire building, but it was judged inadequate for the purpose by the school committee. It was not until 1913 that land for this school was purchased, with the first building completed in 1915. It was designed by Walter Fontaine, a local architect, who also designed the 1925 addition and the junior high school. The 1952 gymnasium annex was designed by Fontaine's son Oliver. By the 1960s it was overcrowded, and the present Woonsocket High School was opened in 1972. This building remained in use, housing lower grades, until 2009.

== See also ==
- National Register of Historic Places listings in Providence County, Rhode Island
