= Stadium Building =

- U.S. National Register of Historic Places
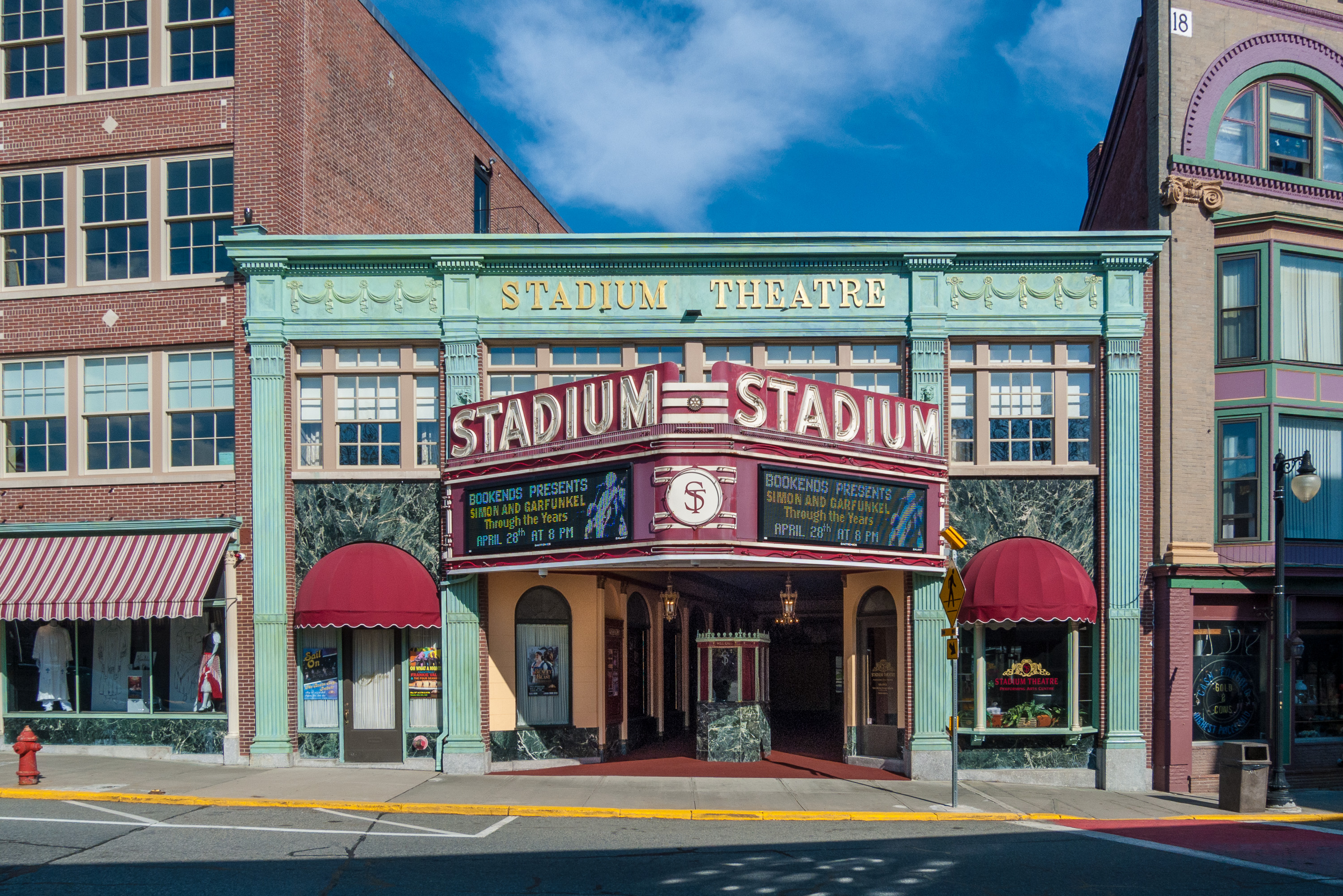

- Location within Rhode Island Location within the United States
- Location: Woonsocket, Rhode Island
- Coordinates: 42°0′19″N 71°30′46″W
- Built: 1926
- Architect: Perry & Whipple
- NRHP reference No.: 76000006
- Added to NRHP: June 30, 1976

The Stadium Theatre Performing Arts Centre & Conservatory is a historic movie theater and concert venue and commercial building at 28 Monument Square in Woonsocket, Rhode Island. The complex consists of two connected sections, one housing the theater, the other offices, both with retail spaces on the ground floor. The theater was designed by Perry and Whipple of Providence and built in 1926.

Initial funding came from Mrs. Norbert Champeau, a widow with interest in the theater, but the project was soon taken over by Arthur I. Darman, a local industrialist. Although it lacked the opulence of theaters in larger cities, it was one of the most elaborately decorated performance spaces in Woonsocket.

The theatre's name comes from the "stadium" style of seating, which allowed everyone in the audience a good view of the stage.

== History ==
The Stadium opened in 1926 as a vaudeville house. The declining theatre added to the National Register of Historic Places in 1976.

The theatre showed x-rated movies in 1980s and closed in 1985.

The building declined and decayed until Mayor Francis Lanctot started a campaign to save the building and raised over $3 million in donations. The renovated venue reopened in 2001.

The film There's Something About Mary by the Farrelly Brothers premiered in the Stadium in 1998.

In 2014, Rhode Island voters approved a bond measure to set aside $2 million to renovate the four-story structure adjacent to the theatre, to be used as dedicated space for costuming, sets, props, and performing arts classes.

== See also ==
- National Register of Historic Places listings in Providence County, Rhode Island
