= Woonsocket District Courthouse =

- U.S. National Register of Historic Places
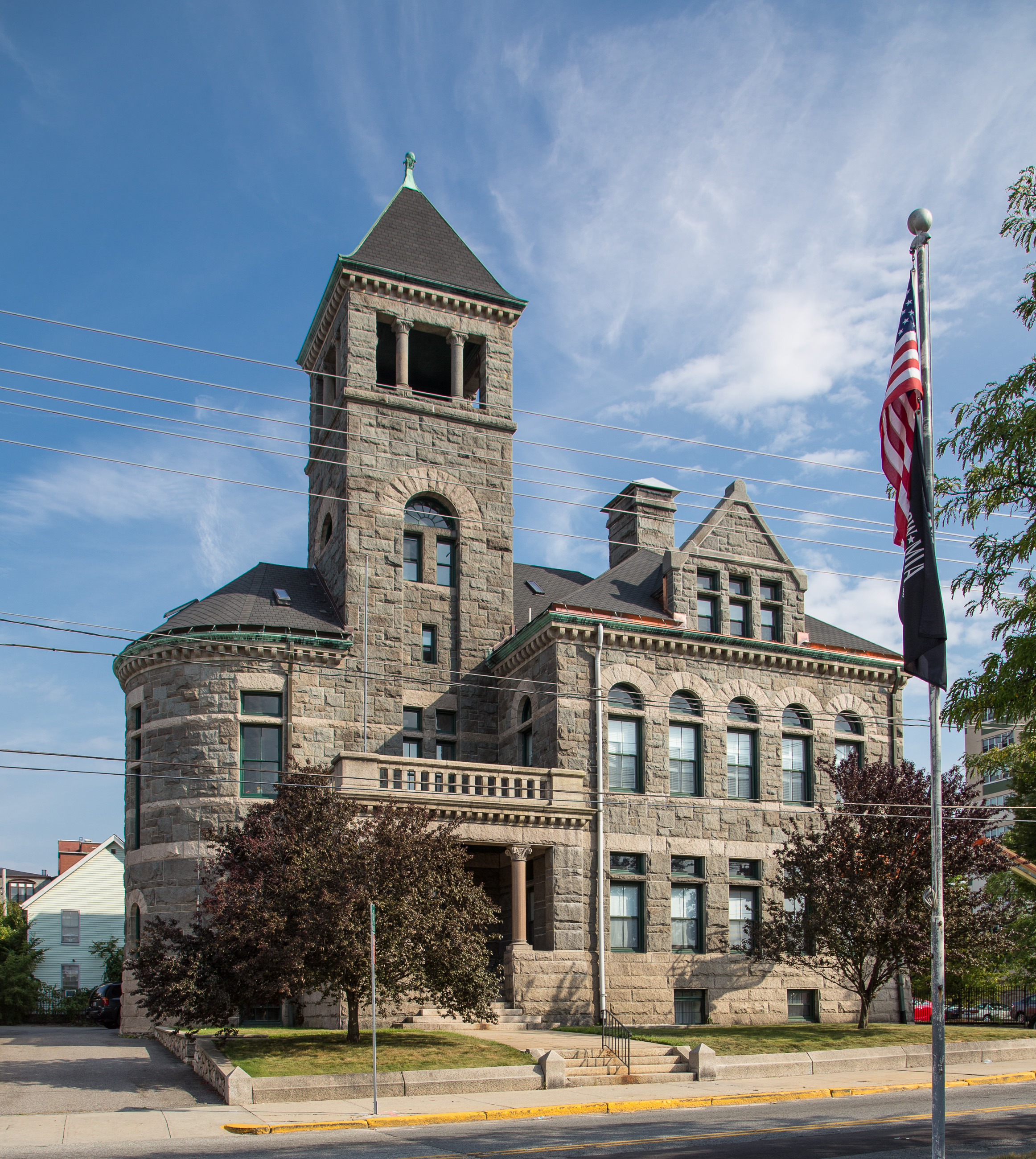

- Location within Rhode Island Location within the United States
- Location: Woonsocket, Rhode Island
- Coordinates: 42°0′6″N 71°30′39″W
- Built: 1894-96
- Built by: William F. Norton; Victor Allaire
- Architect: William R. Walker & Son
- Architectural style: Richardsonian Romanesque
- MPS: Woonsocket MRA
- NRHP reference No.: 82000014
- Added to NRHP: November 24, 1982

The former Woonsocket District Courthouse is a historic court building on 24 Front Street in Woonsocket, Rhode Island.

== History and architecture ==
The courthouse, a two-story stone structure, was designed in 1894 in a Romanesque style by architects William R. Walker & Son of Providence and built by contractors William F. Norton and Victor Allaire of Woonsocket. When completed in 1896 it housed the court of the Twelfth Judicial District, later reorganized as the Seventh Division. In 1990 that court was consolidated with the Fifth Division in Pawtucket, which later was consolidated with the Sixth Division. In 1992 the former courthouse was sold to the City of Woonsocket for $1, and in 2003 it was sold and renovated for residential uses. The building is now known as the Courthouse Condos.

The building is a well-designed, though late, example of the Richardsonian Romanesque style, with some Classical elements. It is typical of the civic buildings designed by its architects in smaller towns and urban centers across the state. In contrast the interiors, which have been preserved, are more consistently in the Classical style.

The courthouse was listed on the National Register of Historic Places in 1982.

== See also ==
- National Register of Historic Places listings in Providence County, Rhode Island
