= Harris Warehouse =

- U.S. National Register of Historic Places
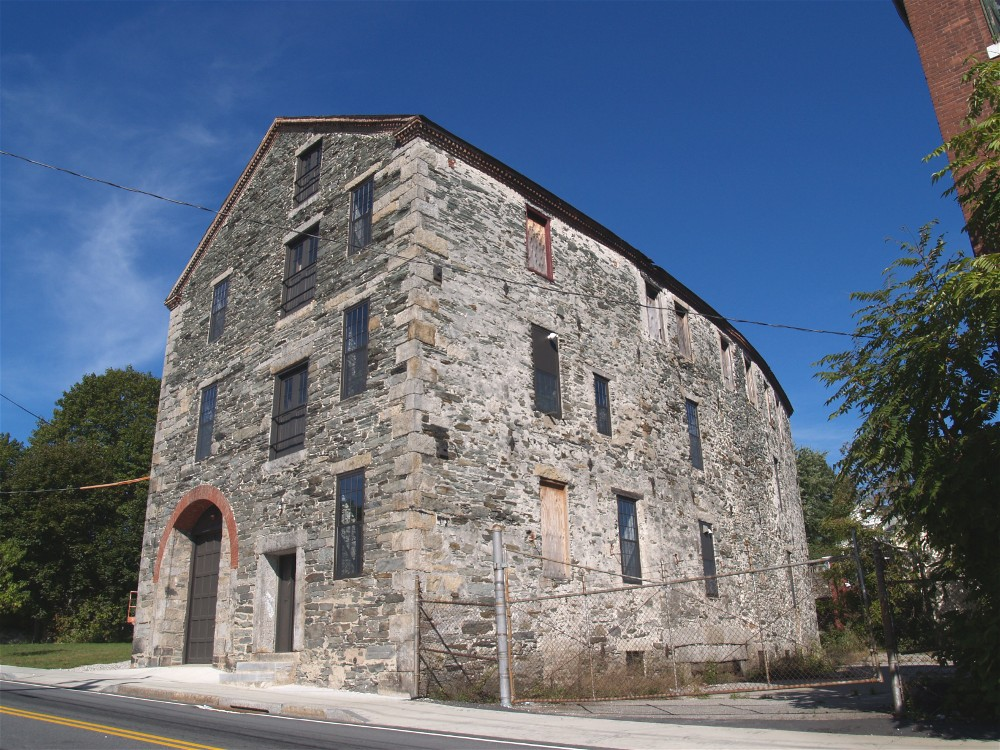

- Location within Rhode Island Location within the United States
- Location: Woonsocket, Rhode Island
- Coordinates: 42°0′14″N 71°30′54″W
- Built: 1855
- NRHP reference No.: 76000047
- Added to NRHP: July 1, 1976

The Harris Warehouse is an historic storage facility on 61 Railroad Street in Woonsocket, Rhode Island. The 3-1/2 story stone structure, built in 1855, by Edward Harris, a leading Woonsocket industrialist, rises abruptly from the street opposite the railroad tracks. The building is distinctive for its rubble stone construction, and its curved facade, designed to match the layout of the railroad spur on which it is located.

The warehouse was listed on the National Register of Historic Places in 1976.

== See also ==
- National Register of Historic Places listings in Providence County, Rhode Island
