= Henry Darling House =

Historic house in Rhode Island, United States

- U.S. National Register of Historic Places
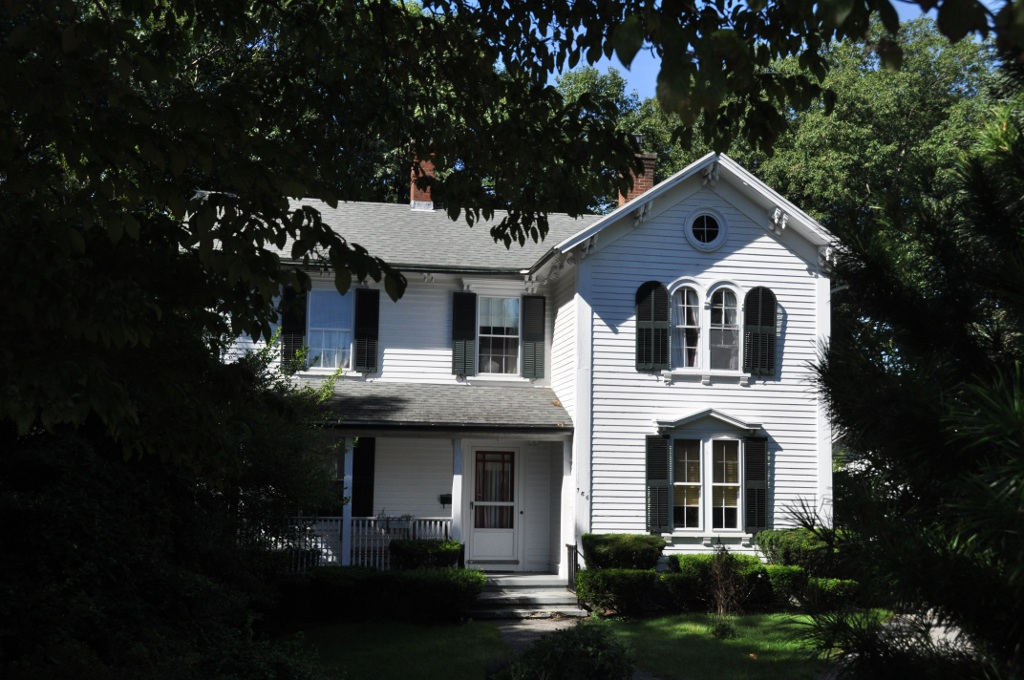

- Location within Rhode Island Location within the United States
- Location: Woonsocket, Rhode Island
- Coordinates: 42°0′50″N 71°31′40″W
- Built: 1865
- MPS: Woonsocket MRA
- NRHP reference No.: 82000136
- Added to NRHP: November 26, 1982

The Henry Darling House is an historic house located at 786 Harris Avenue in Woonsocket, Rhode Island. The two-story wood-frame house was constructed in 1865 by Henry Darling, a farmer, and was at that time on the rural outskirts of Woonsocket.

The house was listed on the National Register of Historic Places on November 26, 1982.

== See also ==
- National Register of Historic Places listings in Providence County, Rhode Island
