= Frank Wilbur House =

Historic house in Rhode Island, United States

- U.S. National Register of Historic Places
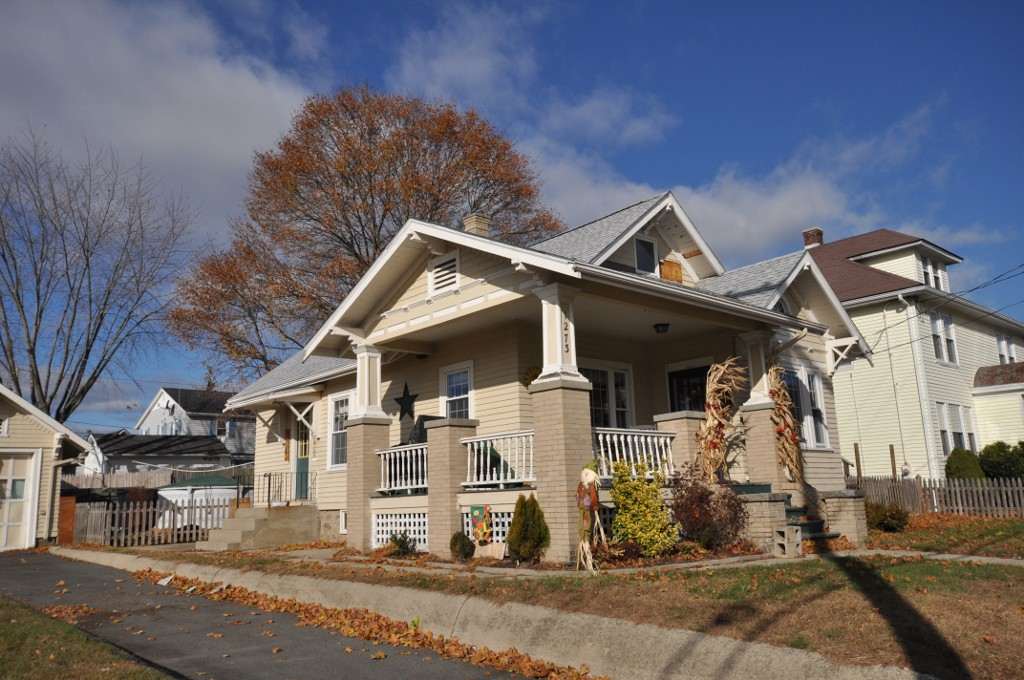

- Location within Rhode Island Location within the United States
- Location: 1273 Park Avenue, Woonsocket, Rhode Island
- Coordinates: 41°59′8″N 71°30′59″W
- Built: 1923
- Architectural style: Bungalow/Craftsman
- MPS: Woonsocket MRA
- NRHP reference No.: 82000012
- Added to NRHP: November 24, 1982

The Frank Wilbur House is a historic house in Woonsocket, Rhode Island, USA near Park Square, Rhode Island. Built c. 1923, this is an architecturally distinctive bungalow form with Japanese elements. It has a complex roof line with three gables and an L-shaped entrance porch with posts mounted on high yellow-brick piers. The front windows are organized in threes with small colored-glass panes flanking clear glass. Wilbur was a farmer who built this house between his farm and Woonsocket Agricultural Society fairgrounds, which is now Our Lady Queen of Martyrs Church.

The house was listed on the National Register of Historic Places in 1982.

== See also ==
- National Register of Historic Places listings in Providence County, Rhode Island
