= Woonsocket Civil War Monument =

- U.S. National Register of Historic Places
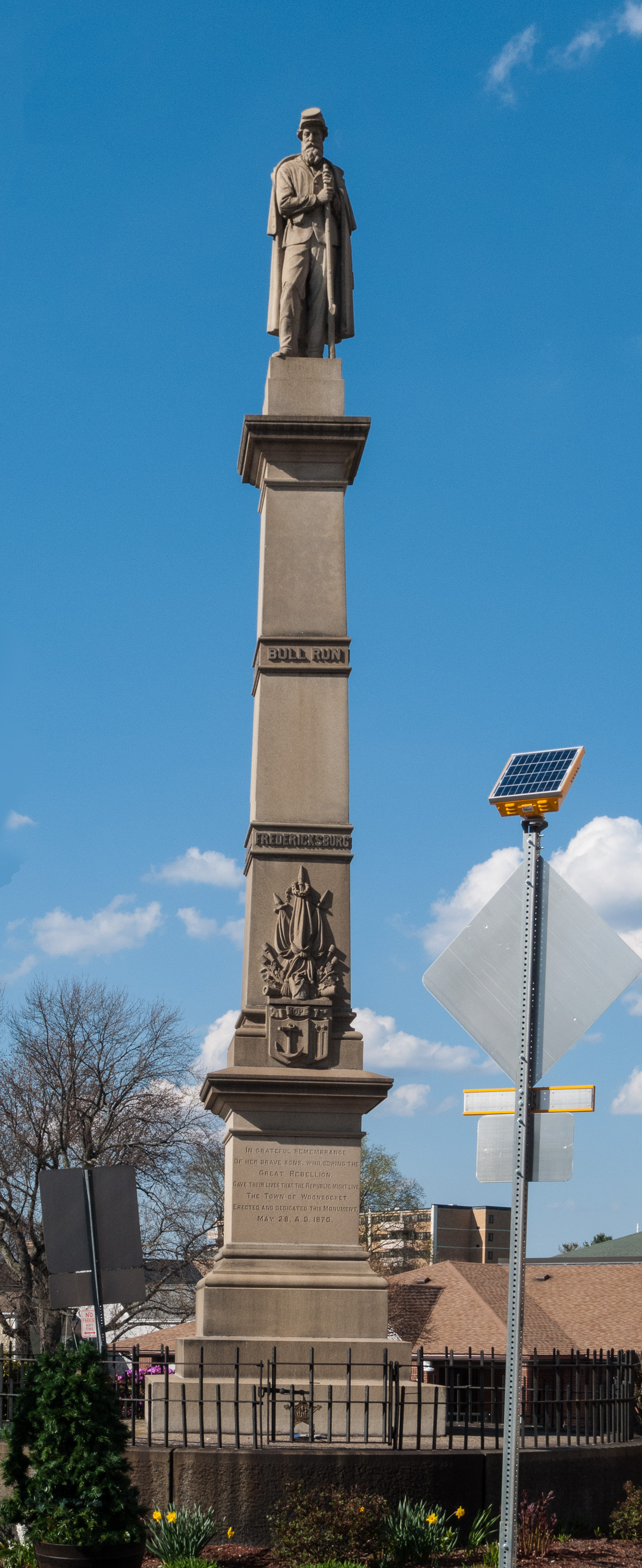

- Location within Rhode Island Location within the United States
- Location: Woonsocket, Rhode Island
- Coordinates: 42°0′19″N 71°30′47″W
- Built: 1868
- Architect: James G. Batterson
- MPS: Woonsocket MRA
- NRHP reference No.: 82000013
- Added to NRHP: November 24, 1982

The Woonsocket Civil War Monument is a historic site at Monument Square in Woonsocket, Rhode Island. It was built to memorialize thirty-nine fallen soldiers from Woonsocket who took part in the Civil War.

Built in 1868 by James G. Batterson, this Civil War memorial was the first Civil War monument constructed in Rhode Island. The monument is made out of granite and is topped with a statue of a Civil War soldier. The names of the battles in which Woonsocket soldiers fought are inscribed on the monument. The monument was added to the National Register of Historic Places in 1982.

== See also ==
- 1868 in art
- National Register of Historic Places listings in Providence County, Rhode Island
