= Logee House =

Historic house in Rhode Island, United States

- U.S. National Register of Historic Places
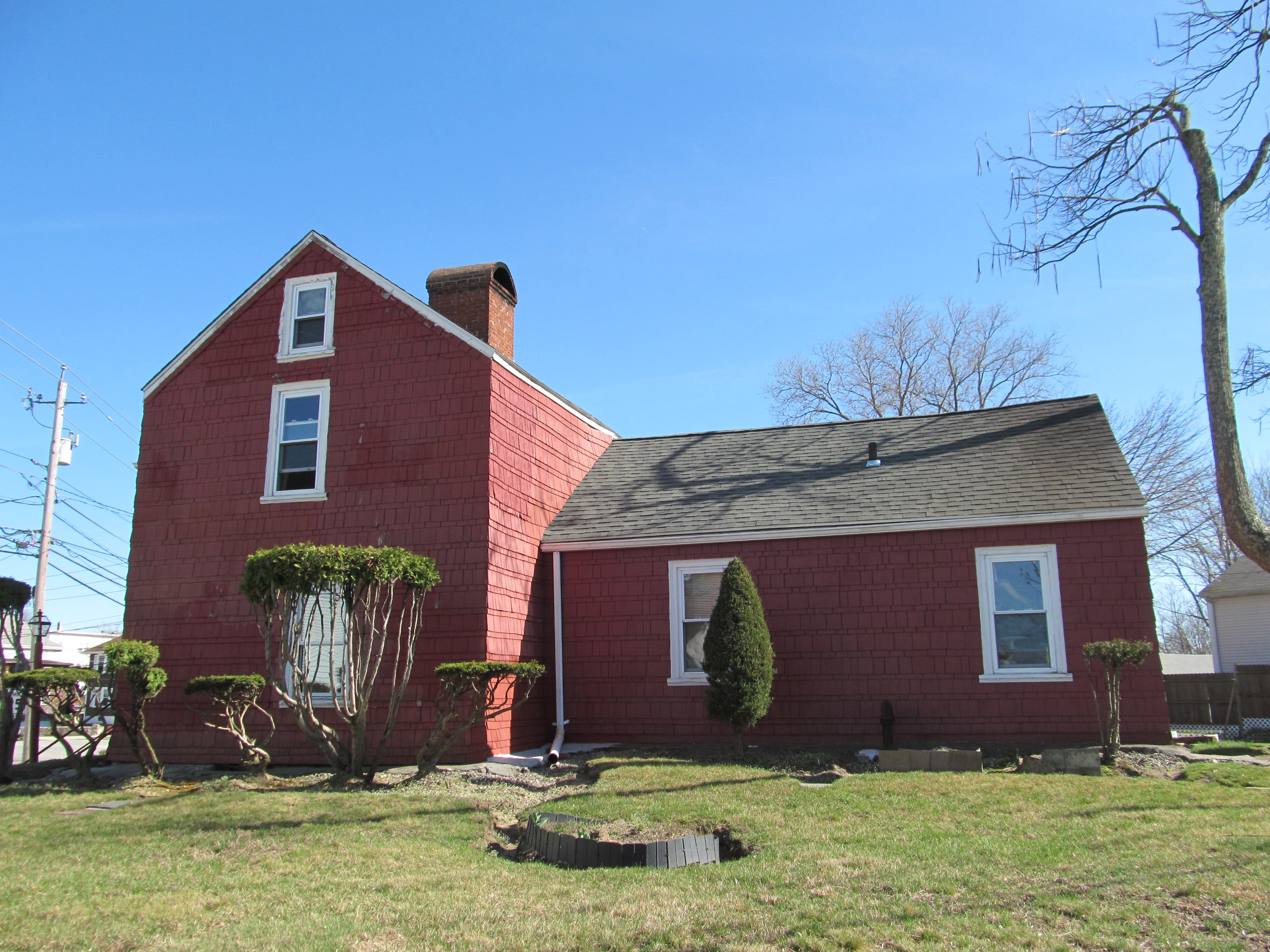
- Logee House

- Location within Rhode Island Location within the United States
- Location: Woonsocket, Rhode Island
- Coordinates: 41°59′41″N 71°30′43″W
- Built: 1729
- MPS: Woonsocket MRA
- NRHP reference No.: 82000001
- Added to NRHP: November 24, 1982

The Logee House is a historic house on 225 Logee Street in Woonsocket, Rhode Island. Built in 1729 by a French Huguenot family, this two-story wood-frame house is a rare early-18th-century house in the city, and one of its best-preserved. The main block follows a plan more typical of colonial Massachusetts houses, unsurprising given the land it stands on was once disputed between the two colonies. The main block has a central chimney, with single rooms on either side on both floors. An ell, probably 18th century in origin, extends from the rear, and a 20th-century porch adorns the front of the house.

The house was listed on the National Register of Historic Places in 1982.

== See also ==
- National Register of Historic Places listings in Providence County, Rhode Island
