= Jenckes Mansion =

Historic house in Rhode Island, United States

- U.S. National Register of Historic Places
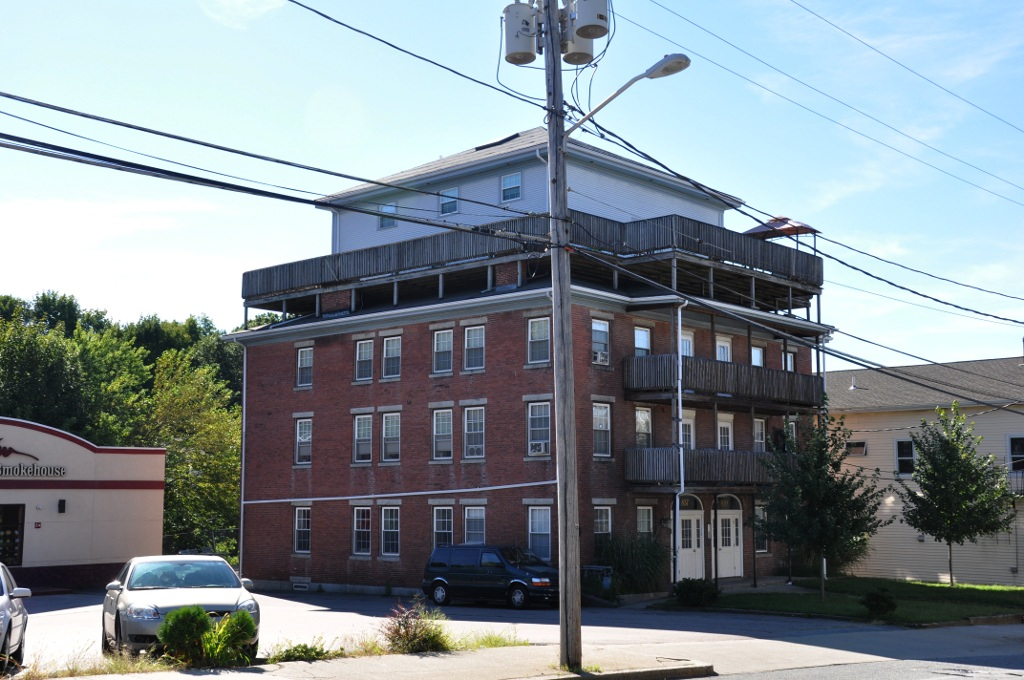

- Location within Rhode Island Location within the United States
- Location: 837 Social Street, Woonsocket, Rhode Island
- Coordinates: 42°0′44″N 71°30′7″W
- Built: 1828
- Architectural style: Federal
- MPS: Woonsocket MRA
- NRHP reference No.: 82000140
- Added to NRHP: November 24, 1982

The Jenckes Mansion is an historic house in Woonsocket, Rhode Island. This three-story brick double house was built in 1828 by the Jenckes family, owners of the mills around which this area of Woonsocket, known as Jenckesville, grew. The building exhibits late Federal styling, and is distinctive as a rare example of a period private residence with ballroom. This space, located on the building's attic space, was divided into residential spaces c. 1900, when the building was converted into a tenement house.

The designer of the house is not known, but the authors of the 1976 historical survey of Woonsocket architecture opine that it is comparable to the work of architect John Holden Greene in Providence.

The house was listed on the National Register of Historic Places in 1982.

== See also ==
- National Register of Historic Places listings in Providence County, Rhode Island
