= Philmont Worsted Company Mill =

- U.S. National Register of Historic Places
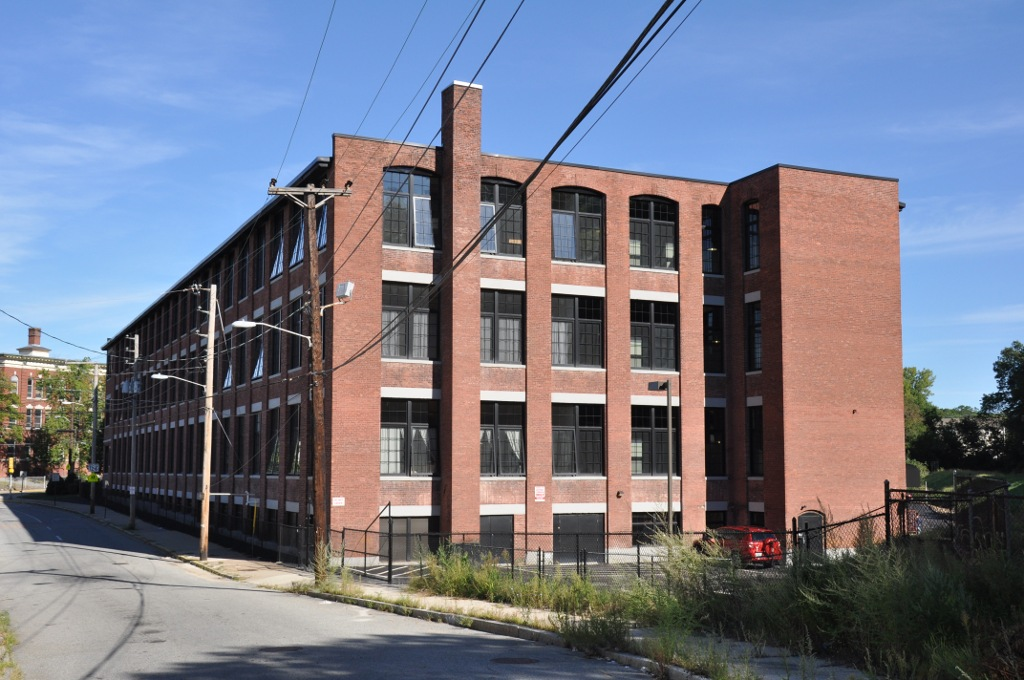

- Location within Rhode Island Location within the United States
- Location: Woonsocket, Rhode Island
- Area: 2.5 acres (1.0 ha)
- Built: 1919
- NRHP reference No.: 06000296
- Added to NRHP: April 19, 2006

The Philmont Worsted Company Mill is an historic mill building at 685 Social Street in Woonsocket, Rhode Island. The large three-story brick building was erected in 1919 by Joseph and Theofile Guerin, Belgian investors brought to Woonsocket by the promotional activities of Mayor Aram Pothier. Unusually for the Guerins, the mill used the "English system", instead of the French system of their other operations, for the production of worsted wool yarns. The Philmont Company was shuttered by the Great Depression in 1933, but the building was later used by other textile producers until 1955. The building has been converted to residences.

The building was listed on the National Register of Historic Places in 2006.

== See also ==
- National Register of Historic Places listings in Providence County, Rhode Island
