= Allen Street Historic District =

Historic district in Rhode Island, United States

- U.S. National Register of Historic Places
- U.S. Historic district
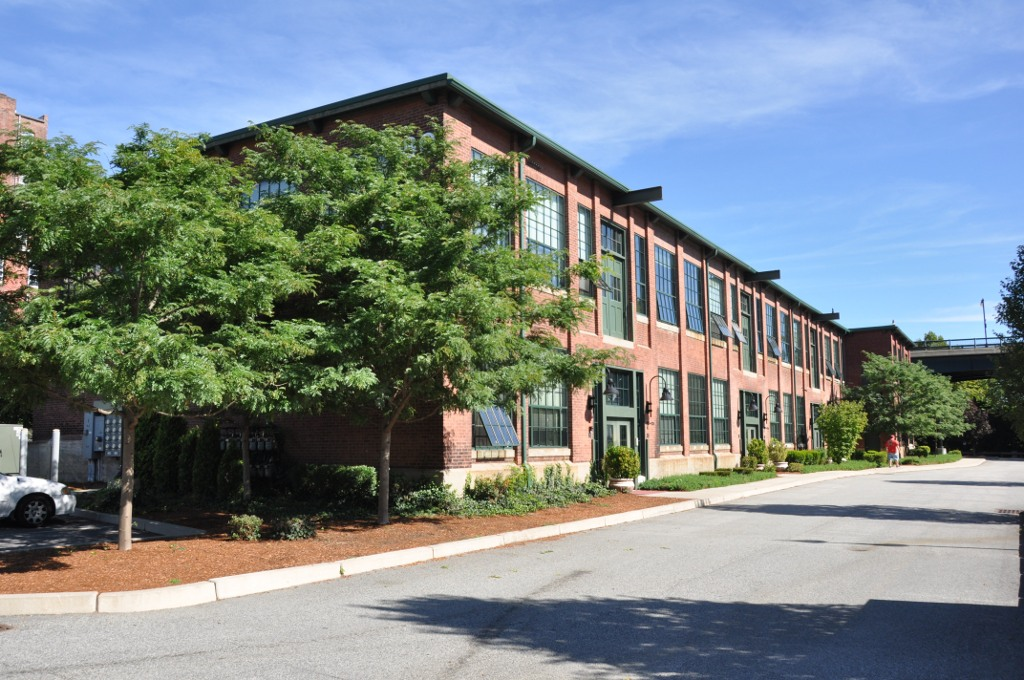

- Location within Rhode Island Location within the United States
- Location: Woonsocket, Rhode Island
- Coordinates: 42°0′6″N 71°30′50″W
- Built: 1860
- Architectural style: Mid 19th Century Revival, Late 19th And Early 20th Century American Movements, Late Victorian
- MPS: Woonsocket MPS
- NRHP reference No.: 90001349
- Added to NRHP: September 13, 1990

Allen Street Historic District is a historic district encompassing a collection of smaller textile mills in central Woonsocket, Rhode Island. The district extends on either side of Allen Street, a road isolated between Truman Drive (built in the mid-20th century) and the Blackstone River, and includes buildings dating from c. 1860 to c. 1930. Of the five textile mill buildings in the district, four are brick structures built between about 1900 and 1920; the oldest building in the district is the c. 1860 Pond's Warp Mill at 148 Bernon Street. The latter is also adjacent to a rare visible fragment of the once-extensive canal works (now mostly filled in and built over) that characterized the industrial center of Woonsocket. Many of the district's buildings have been converted to housing.

The district was added to the National Register of Historic Places in 1990.

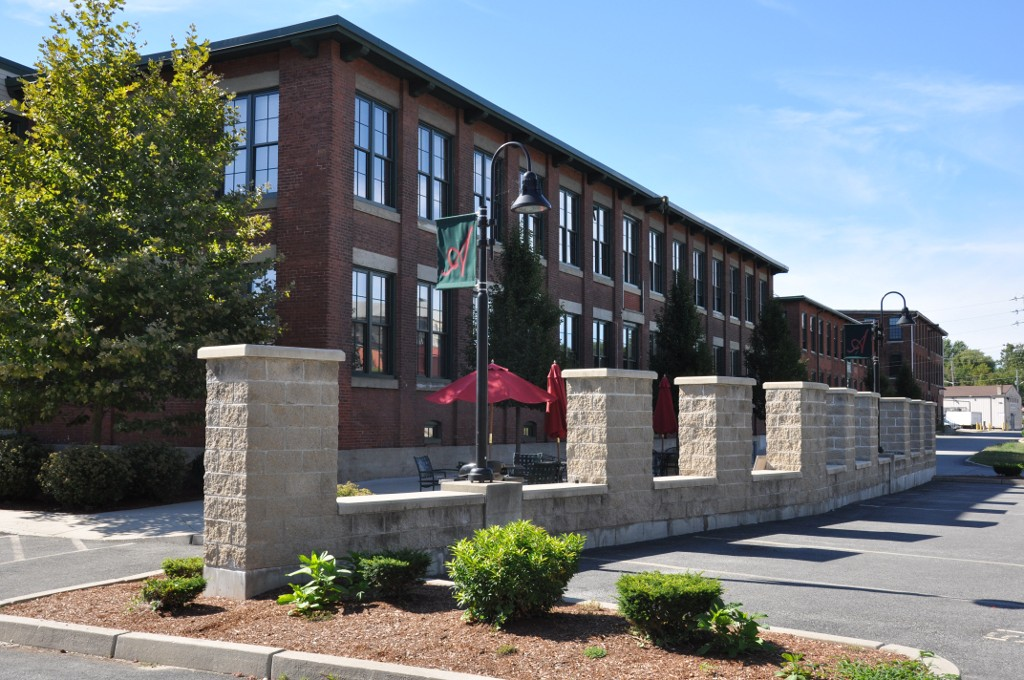

== See also ==
- National Register of Historic Places listings in Providence County, Rhode Island
