= Glenark Mills =

- U.S. National Register of Historic Places
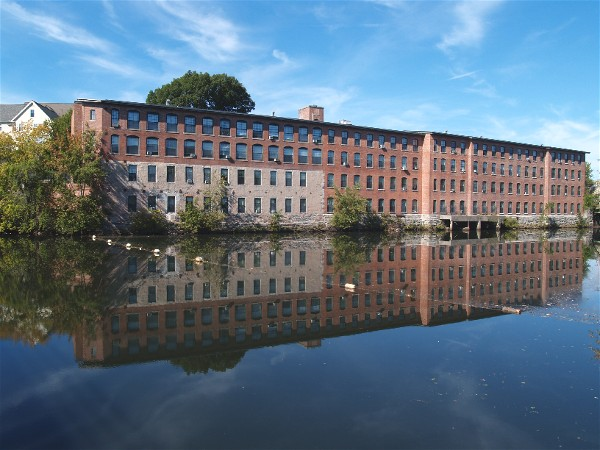
- Glenark Mill

- Location within Rhode Island Location within the United States
- Location: Woonsocket, Rhode Island
- Coordinates: 41°59′54″N 71°31′9″W
- Built: 1865
- Architect: Norton, William
- Architectural style: Late Victorian
- MPS: Woonsocket MRA
- NRHP reference No.: 89000409
- Added to NRHP: May 15, 1989

The Glenark Mills or Glenark Landing is a historic textile mill complex on 64 East Street in Woonsocket, Rhode Island. The original stone section of this mill was constructed 1865 by William Norton and was enlarged with a brick addition in 1885. Originally a cotton mill, the building was converted for use as a knitting mill and then as a worsted mill. It was added to the National Register of Historic Places in 1989.

The building has now been converted to apartments.

== See also ==
- National Register of Historic Places listings in Providence County, Rhode Island
