= Alphonse Gaulin Jr. House =

Historic house in Rhode Island, United States

- U.S. National Register of Historic Places
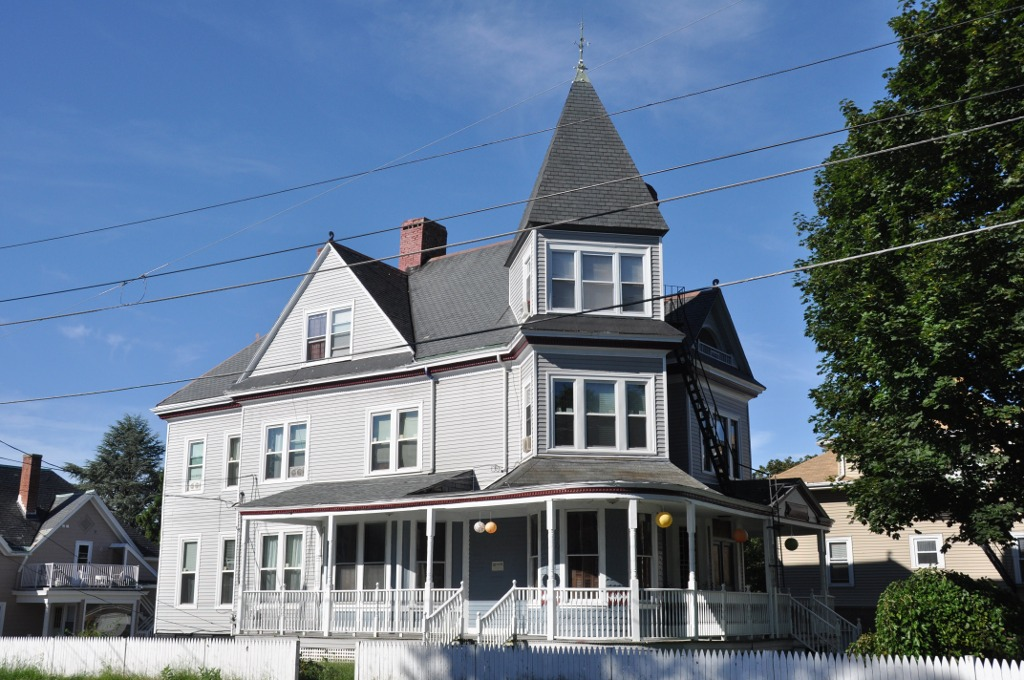

- Location within Rhode Island Location within the United States
- Location: 311 Elm Street, Woonsocket, Rhode Island
- Coordinates: 42°0′25″N 71°29′55″W
- Built: 1885
- Architectural style: Queen Anne
- MPS: Woonsocket MRA
- NRHP reference No.: 82000137
- Added to NRHP: November 24, 1982

The Alphonse Gaulin Jr. House is an historic house in Woonsocket, Rhode Island. The 2 1/2-story wood-frame house was built c. 1885 by Alphonse Gaulin Jr., one of the city's first wealthy French-Canadian residents and its mayor 1903–05. The house is one of the city's finest Queen Anne Victorians, exhibiting the asymmetrical massing, varying projections, and a square tower projecting diagonally from one corner.

The house was listed on the National Register of Historic Places in 1982.

== See also ==
- National Register of Historic Places listings in Providence County, Rhode Island
