= 1761 Milestone =

Mile marker in Woonsocket, Rhode Island

- U.S. National Register of Historic Places
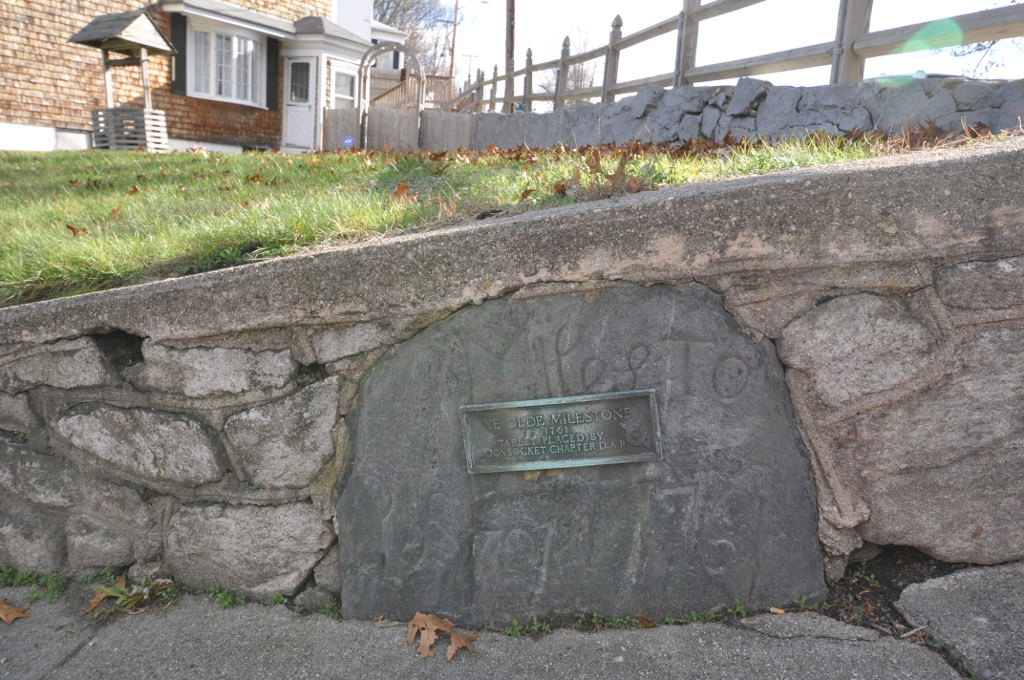

- Location within Rhode Island Location within the United States
- Location: 640 South Main Street, Woonsocket, Rhode Island
- Coordinates: 41°59′22″N 71°31′54″W
- Built: 1761
- MPS: Woonsocket MRA
- NRHP reference No.: 82000131
- Added to NRHP: November 24, 1982

The 1761 Milestone is a mile marker located at 640 South Main Street in Woonsocket, Rhode Island. The stone originally marked the junction of a Colonial highway from Great Road and an east–west route from Boston, Massachusetts to Connecticut. It was rediscovered during the installation of an electrical road (likely a tram). In 1898, it was restored to its original location by the local chapter of the Daughters of the American Revolution. The stone is embedded in a low retaining wall at the corner of South Main Street and Smithfield Road. It was added to the National Register of Historic Places on November 24, 1982, and is historically significant as a Colonial-era highway marker.

== History ==
The 1761 Milestone is a historic marker that marked the junction of a Colonial highway. In 1761, it was located at the intersection of Great Road from Providence, Rhode Island to Mendon, Massachusetts, and an east–west route from Boston, Massachusetts into Connecticut. Currently, it rests near the intersection of South Main Street and Smithfield Road (previously Great Road) and occupies the land designated by the Woonsocket Assessor as plat 4-C, lot 69.

The 2 feet (0.61 m) by 3 feet (0.91 m) marker is described by the National Register of Historic Places (NRHP) nomination form as an "odd-shaped piece of grey slate, somewhat broken and effaced". It bears a boldly cut inscription of an unknown stonecutter; the inscription is likened to 18th-century handwriting and lacks a calligraphic pattern. The marker reads "...Miles to Boston 1761".

The stone was unearthed during the installation of an "electrical road", according to a report to the Daughters of the American Revolution (DAR), which probably refers to a tramway; the Woonsocket chapter of the DAR restored it to its original location. Sometime later, the DAR placed a bronze plaque on the stone, but it was absent at the time of its nomination in 1982. The marker is currently mortared into a retaining wall at the edge of the sidewalk on 640 South Main Street at the intersection.

== Importance ==
The National Register of Historic Places nomination states that the marker is at its original site and is historically important because it is "the only extant Woonsocket property which well recalls this era in the early history of American overland transportation," and that there are "but a handful" of stones in Rhode Island which marked colonial highways. It was added to the National Register of Historic Places on November 24, 1982.

== See also ==
- National Register of Historic Places listings in Providence County, Rhode Island
