= Woonsocket Company Mill Complex =

- U.S. National Register of Historic Places
- U.S. Historic district
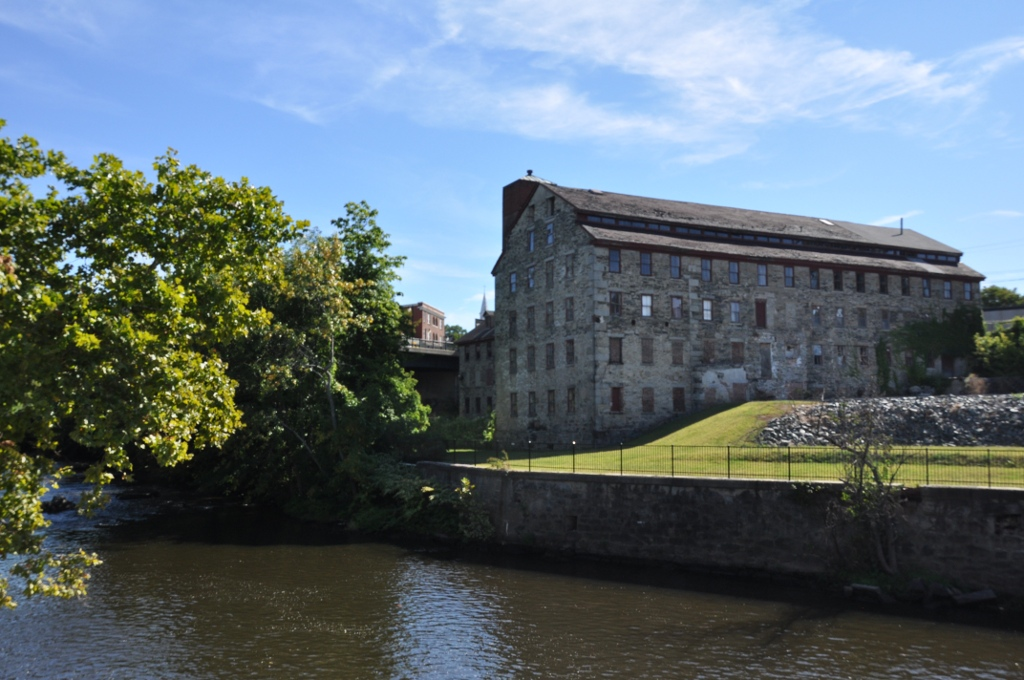

- Location within Rhode Island Location within the United States
- Location: Woonsocket, Rhode Island
- Coordinates: 42°0′5″N 71°30′46″W
- Architectural style: Greek Revival
- NRHP reference No.: 73000005
- Added to NRHP: May 7, 1973

The Woonsocket Company Mill Complex (also known as Hemond, Inc., Woonsocket Weaving Co., Blackstone Valley Electric) is a historic district encompassing one of the largest mill complexes in Woonsocket, Rhode Island. The district includes all of the buildings historically associated with the Woonsocket Company, a major manufacturer of cotton textiles in the 19th century. The complex is located along the eastern bank of the Blackstone River between Court and Bernon Streets. It includes three handsome stone mills, built between 1827 and 1859, and a power plant that was built on the site of the former #3 mill between 1890 and 1920, as well as the remnants of the canal that originally carried water to the buildings for power.

The district was listed on the National Register of Historic Places in 1973.

== See also ==
- National Register of Historic Places listings in Providence County, Rhode Island
