= Linton Block =

- U.S. National Register of Historic Places
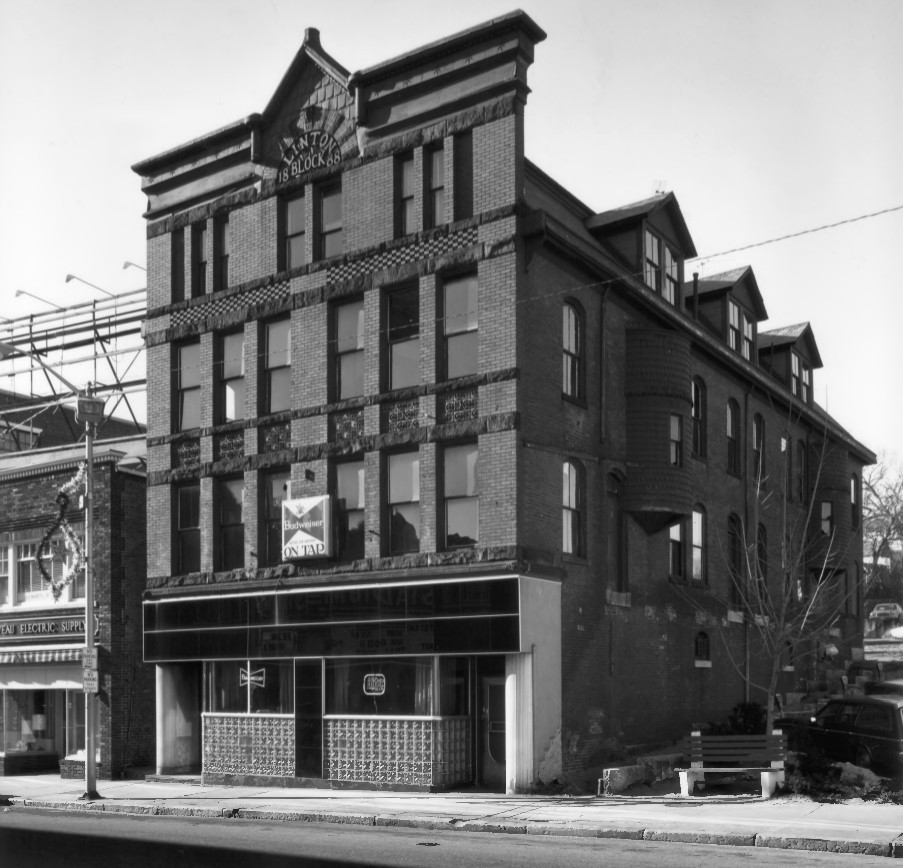
- 1981 photo

- Location within Rhode Island Location within the United States
- Location: 3–5 Monument Sq., Woonsocket, Rhode Island
- Coordinates: 42°0′19″N 71°30′48″W
- Built: 1888
- Architectural style: Queen Anne, Romanesque
- MPS: Woonsocket MRA
- NRHP reference No.: 82000143
- Added to NRHP: November 24, 1982

The Linton Block was a historic site in Woonsocket, Rhode Island.

It was a 4-storey office and domestic accommodation block built by Robert Linton in 1888 to house his drug store. Built in a Queen Anne/Romanesque style, the brick facade was ornamented with brickwork patterning and terra cotta panels and the side elevations embellished with cut shingles.

It was badly damaged by fire in 1890. It was added to the National Historic Register in 1982. It was destroyed by fire on March 22, 2000.

== See also ==
- National Register of Historic Places listings in Providence County, Rhode Island
