= St. Charles Borromeo Church Complex (Woonsocket, Rhode Island) =

Historic church in Rhode Island, United States

- U.S. National Register of Historic Places
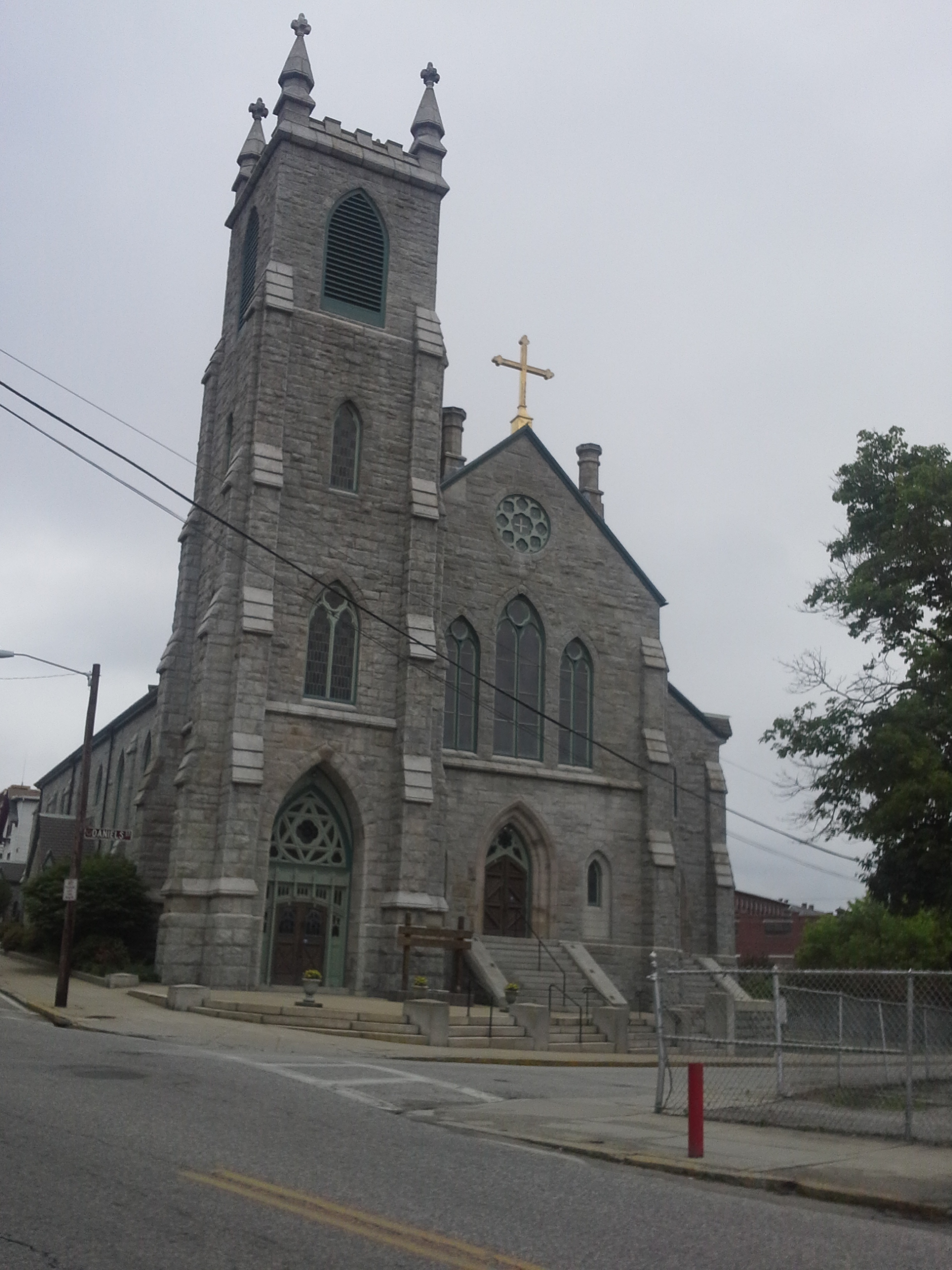

- Location within Rhode Island Location within the United States
- Location: Woonsocket, Rhode Island
- Coordinates: 42°0′29″N 71°30′52″W
- Area: 1.3 acres (0.53 ha)
- Architect: Keeley, Patrick C.
- Architectural style: Gothic
- MPS: Woonsocket MRA
- NRHP reference No.: 83000003
- Added to NRHP: February 24, 1983

The St. Charles Borromeo Church is a former Roman Catholic parish church in Woonsocket, Rhode Island, located on North Main Street. The parish of St. Charles was canonically suppressed January 12, 2020 and the congregation merged with that of the Church of All Saints, another parish of the Diocese of Providence, although the church remains open as an alternative worship space.

== History ==
The Gothic Revival-style church was designed by Patrick Keely and built 1867–71 to serve the area's Irish Catholic population. The complex also includes a clergy house (1881), school (1897), and convent (1868). All were listed on the National Register of Historic Places as St. Charles Borromeo Church Complex in 1983.

== See also ==
- National Register of Historic Places listings in Providence County, Rhode Island
