= South Main Street Historic District (Woonsocket, Rhode Island) =

Historic district in Rhode Island, United States

- U.S. National Register of Historic Places
- U.S. Historic district
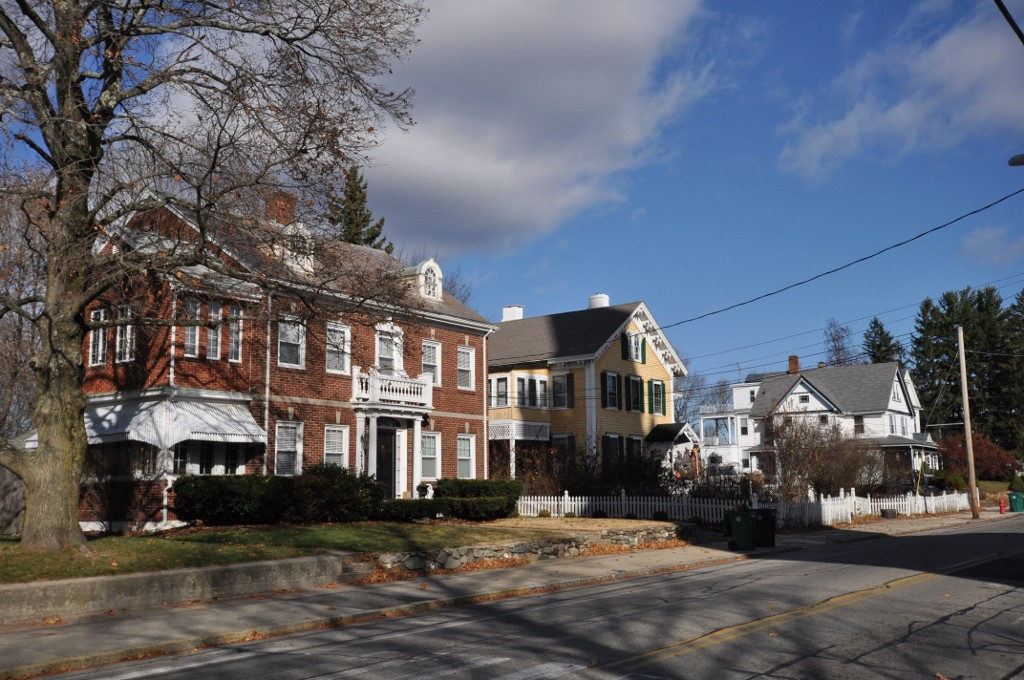
- Houses on South Main Street

- Location within Rhode Island Location within the United States
- Location: Woonsocket, Rhode Island
- Coordinates: 41.9934°N 71.5258°W
- Architectural style: Greek Revival, Queen Anne
- MPS: Woonsocket MRA
- NRHP reference No.: 82000009
- Added to NRHP: November 24, 1982

The South Main Street Historic District is a residential historic district in Woonsocket, Rhode Island. It extends along South Main Street between Mason Street on one end and Andrews and Bradford Streets on the other, and includes properties on adjacent streets, principally Ballou and North Ballou Streets. The district includes 65 main properties, most of which were built between 1880 and 1930, although there is a cluster of older properties (Greek Revival houses dating as far back as 1830) in the northern half of the district. The district typifies the American main road leading into a town, lined by landscaped lots with high-quality houses.

The district was listed on the National Register of Historic Places in 1982.

== See also ==
- National Register of Historic Places listings in Providence County, Rhode Island
