= Bernon Worsted Mill =

- U.S. National Register of Historic Places
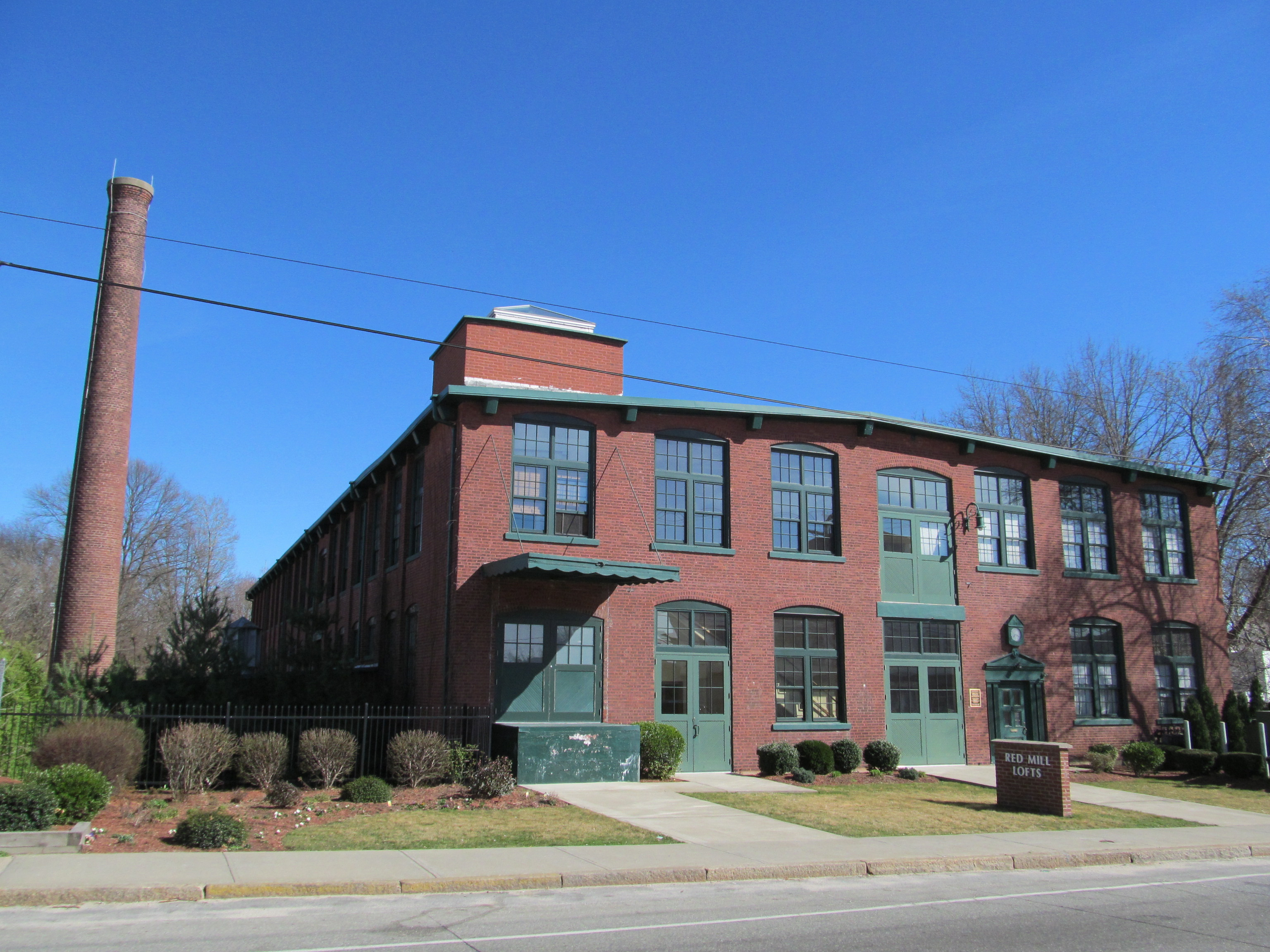
- Bernon Worsted Mill

- Location within Rhode Island Location within the United States
- Location: Woonsocket, Rhode Island
- Coordinates: 41°59′38″N 71°30′50″W
- Area: 4.37 acres (1.77 ha)
- Built: 1919
- NRHP reference No.: 05000585
- Added to NRHP: June 10, 2005

The Bernon Worsted Mill is an historic textile mill at 828 Park Avenue in Woonsocket, Rhode Island. It is a brick building, two stories tall, about 280 feet (85 m) in length. It was built in 1919 by Charles Augustus Proulx, and was operated as a producer of specialty custom worsted wool yarns, in what was then a sparsely populated part of the city. The building saw somewhat regular use in the manufacture of textiles until 2004.

The mill was added to the National Register of Historic Places in 2005. It was renovated into condominiums in 2005 known as the "Red Mill Lofts."

== See also ==
- National Register of Historic Places listings in Providence County, Rhode Island
