= North End Historic District (Woonsocket, Rhode Island) =

Historic district in Rhode Island, United States

- U.S. National Register of Historic Places
- U.S. Historic district
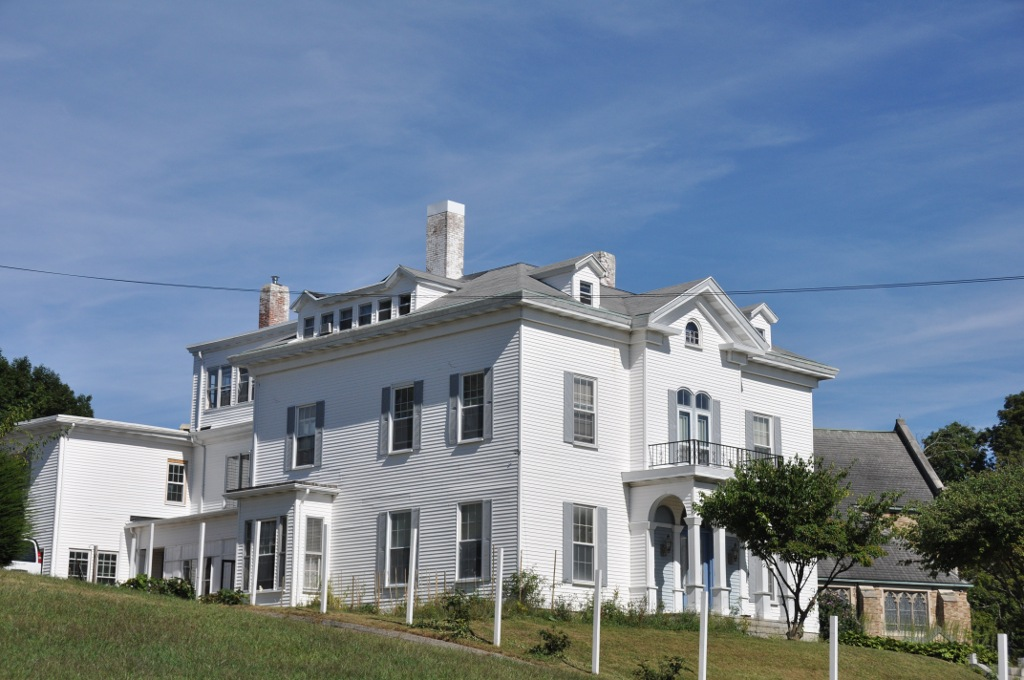

- Location within Rhode Island Location within the United States
- Location: Woonsocket, Rhode Island
- Coordinates: 42.0086°N 71.5208°W
- Architectural style: Colonial Revival, Queen Anne
- MPS: Woonsocket MRA
- NRHP reference No.: 82000002
- Added to NRHP: November 24, 1982

The North End Historic District is a historic district in Woonsocket, Rhode Island encompassing an affluent residential area developed predominantly between about 1880 and 1930. It is bounded by Harris Avenue on the west, Winter Street on the north, Summer and Prospect Streets to the east, and Spring and Blackstone Streets to the south. It is separated from Woonsockets commercial and industrial heart by a neighborhood of densely populated worker housing. Most of the district's 224 major buildings are of relatively high quality and in good condition, and are reflective of the architectural styles that predominated in the late 19th and early 20th centuries: Queen Anne Victorian, Colonial Revival, and Tudor Revival forms and styles are the most common seen.

The district was listed on the National Register of Historic Places in 1982.

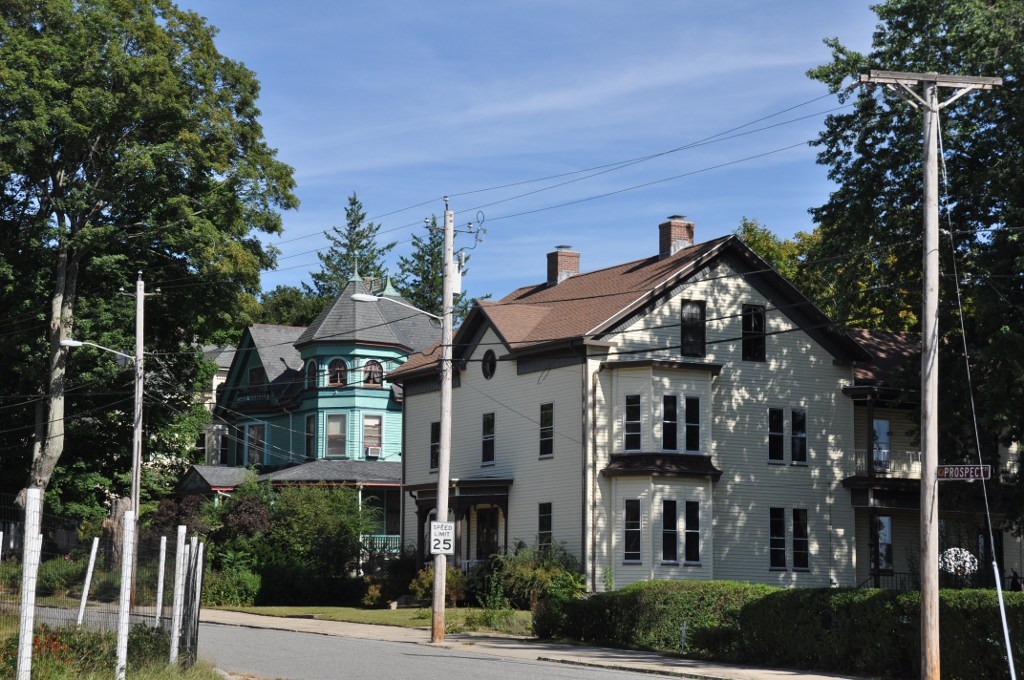

== See also ==
- National Register of Historic Places listings in Providence County, Rhode Island
