= Hanora Mills =

- U.S. National Register of Historic Places
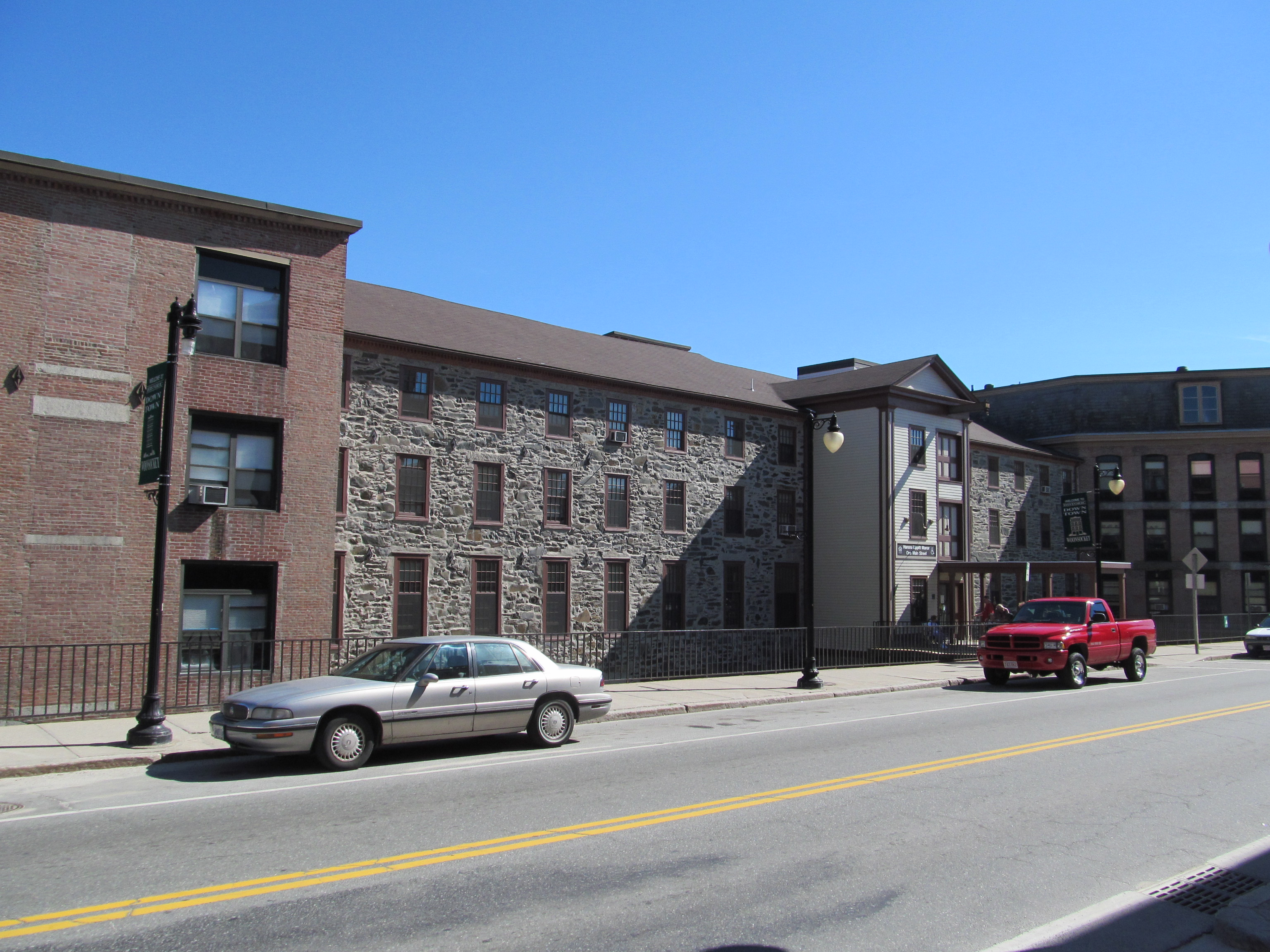
- Hanora Mills

- Location within Rhode Island Location within the United States
- Location: 1 Main Street, Woonsocket, Rhode Island
- Coordinates: 42°0′2″N 71°30′58″W
- Built: 1827
- Architectural style: Greek Revival
- MPS: Woonsocket MRA
- NRHP reference No.: 82000139
- Added to NRHP: November 24, 1982

The Hanora Mills (also known as the Hanora Lippitt Mills Apartments) are a historic textile mill complex in the center of Woonsocket, Rhode Island.

The oldest part of the mill complex was constructed in brick around 1827 by the Ballou family, and it was named Harrison Mills. The mill was a water powered facility with a specially dug trench. In the mid-nineteenth century, Henry Lippitt's company purchased the mill from the Ballous, and it became known as Lippitt Mills. There are various other buildings which were gradually constructed as the site expanded with the latest dating to the turn of the twentieth century. The mill was renamed Hanora Mills in the twentieth century after the Lippitts sold the site. The mills produced woolen textiles until 1975 when the facility was closed. Several of the buildings feature a Greek Revival style, and the whole site was added to the National Register of Historic Places in 1982. The historic mill buildings were renovated into apartments for the elderly in the 1980s.

== See also ==
- National Register of Historic Places listings in Providence County, Rhode Island
