= Woonsocket, Rhode Island =

City in Rhode Island, United States

Woonsocket
- City
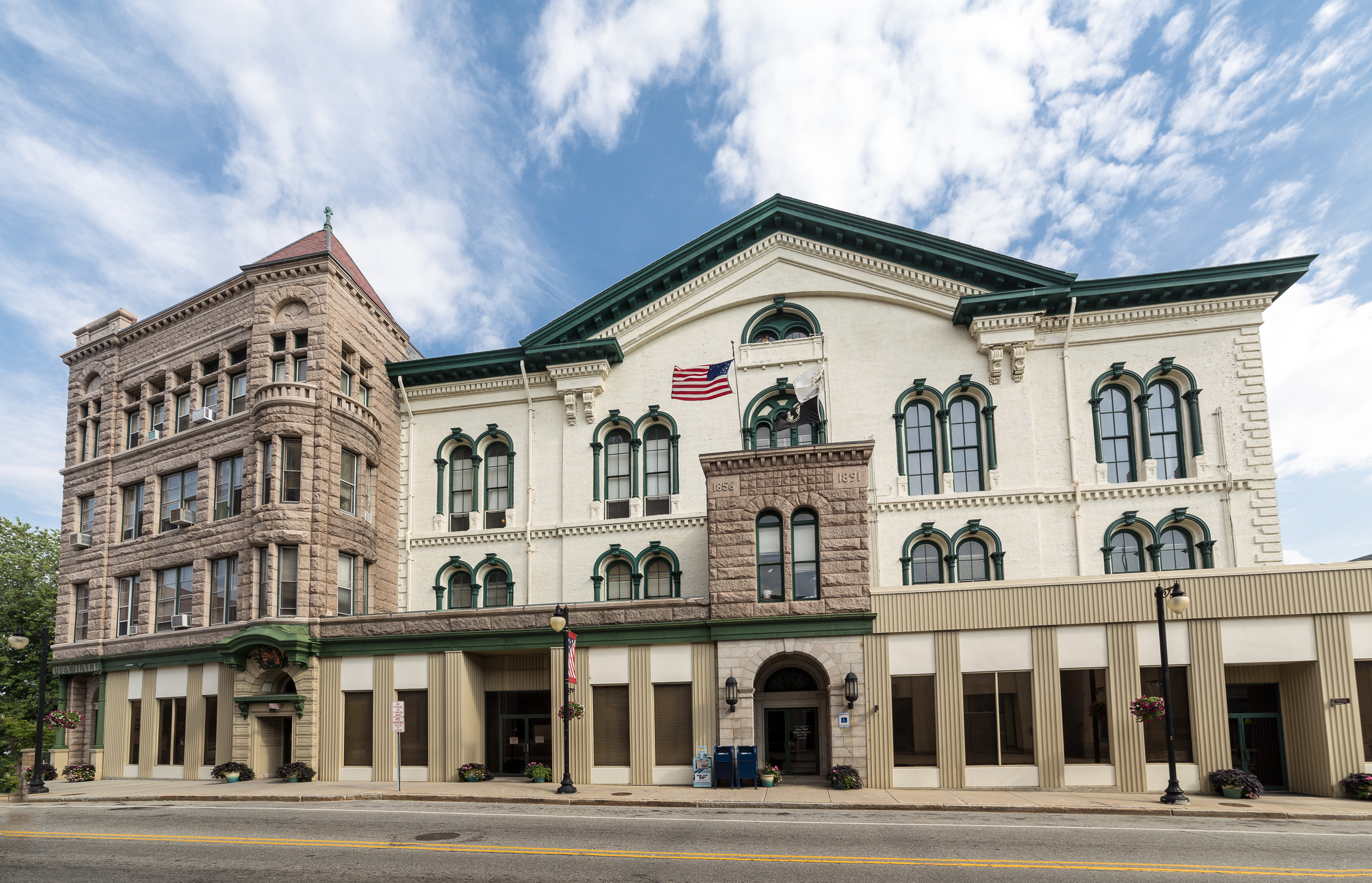
- Woonsocket's city hall

- Seal
- Motto: "A City on the Move"
- Location in Providence County and the state of Rhode Island
- Coordinates: 42°00′30″N 71°30′58″W
- Country: United States
- State: Rhode Island
- County: Providence
- Incorporated (town): 1867
- Incorporated (city): 1888

Government
  - Type: Mayor-council
  - Mayor: Christopher Beauchamp

Area
  - Total: 7.93 sq mi (20.55 km^{2})
  - Land: 7.75 sq mi (20.06 km^{2})
  - Water: 0.19 sq mi (0.48 km^{2})
- Elevation: 194 ft (59 m)

Population (2020)
  - Total: 43,240
  - Density: 5,582.5/sq mi (2,155.42/km^{2})
- Time zone: UTC−5 (Eastern)
  - Summer (DST): UTC−4 (Eastern)
- ZIP Code: 02895
- Area code: 401
- FIPS code: 44-80780
- GNIS feature ID: 1219339
- Website: https://www.woonsocketri.gov/

Woonsocket (/wʊnˈsɒkɪt, wən-/ wuun-SOK-it, wən-), is a city in Providence County, Rhode Island, United States. The population was 43,240 at the 2020 census, making it the sixth largest city in the state. Being Rhode Island's northernmost city, Woonsocket lies directly south of the Massachusetts state line and constitutes part of both the Providence metropolitan area and the larger Greater Boston Combined Statistical Area.

The city is the corporate headquarters of CVS Health, a pharmacy services provider. It is home to Landmark Medical Center, the Museum of Work and Culture, and the American-French Genealogical Society.

== History ==
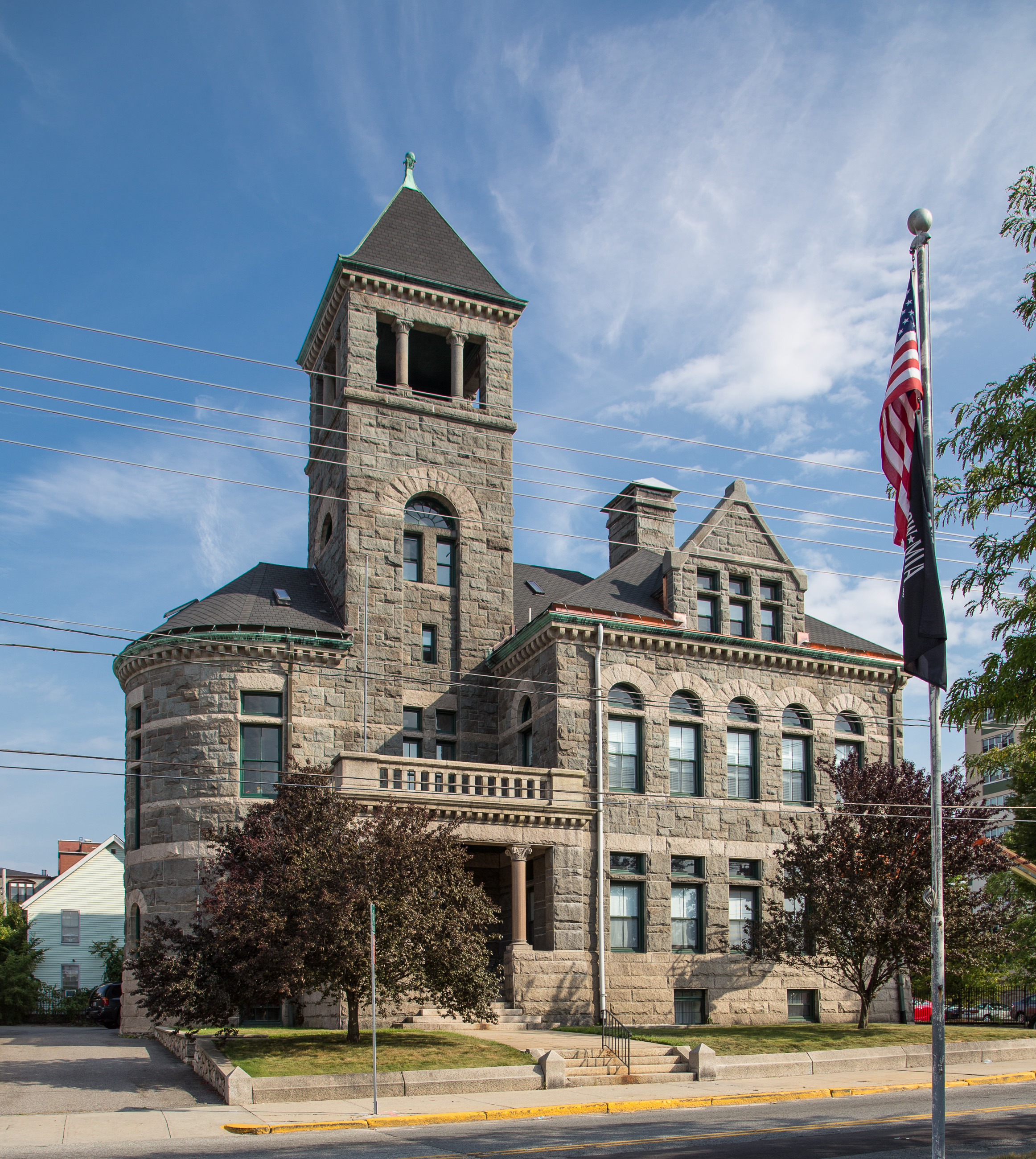
Woonsocket District Courthouse, built in 1894

Before the arrival of European settlers in northern Rhode Island during the 17th century, today's Woonsocket region was inhabited by three Native American tribes: the Nipmuc (Cowesett), Wampanoag, and Narragansett. In 1661, the English theologian Roger Williams purchased the area from the "Coweset and Nipmucks", and in a letter referred to modern day Woonsocket as Niswosakit.

Other possible derivations of the name include several Nipmuc geographic names from nearby Massachusetts. These include Woonksechocksett, from Worcester County meaning "fox country", and Wannashowatuckqut, also from Worcester County, meaning "at the fork of the river". Another theory proposes that the city was named after Woonsocket Hill in neighboring North Smithfield.

Woonsocket Falls Village was founded in the 1820s. Its fortunes expanded as the Industrial Revolution developed in nearby Pawtucket. With the Blackstone River providing ample water power, the region became a prime location for textile mills. In 1831 Edward Harris built his first textile mill in Woonsocket.

The town of Woonsocket was not established until 1867, when three villages in the town of Cumberland, namely Woonsocket Falls, Social and Jenckesville, officially became the town of Woonsocket. In 1871, three additional industrial villages from Smithfield—Hamlet, Bernon, and Globe—were added to the town, establishing its present boundaries. Woonsocket was incorporated as city in 1888.

The growth of industries and associated jobs attracted numerous immigrants, predominantly Québecois and French-Canadians from other provinces. When the Société Saint-Jean-Baptiste d'Holyoke organized a national cultural and benefit society in 1899, the Union Saint-Jean-Baptiste d'Amérique, Woonsocket, with its proximity to several industrial areas having large French-Canadian populations, was chosen for the organization's headquarters.

By 1913, a survey by the American Association of Foreign Language Newspapers found the city had to have the sixth-largest population of French or French-Canadian foreign nationals in the country. In the decades that followed this population grew, and by time the local textile industry were shuttered during the Great Depression, ethnic French Canadians comprised 75 percent of the population. French-language newspapers were published; radio programs, movies, and most public conversations were conducted in French. As recently as 1980, 70% of Woonsocket's population was of French-Canadian descent. The New England French language their ancestors spoke gradually vanished from public discourse.

Throughout the 20th century the city's fortunes ebbed and flowed with national trends. During the Great Depression the textile economy of Woonsocket came to an effective standstill; however, it was revived during World War II. The city became a major center of fabric manufacturing for the war effort, including production of military uniforms.

In the postwar years, the Woonsocket economy diversified as manufacturing declined, and other commercial sectors, such as retail, technology and financial services took hold. In the early 1980s Woonsocket was struggling with high unemployment rates.

Beginning in 1979, Woonsocket sponsored Autumnfest, an annual cultural festival that takes place on Columbus Day weekend, at World War II Veteran's Memorial State Park. It has become one of the city's most popular events, attracting thousands of attendees.

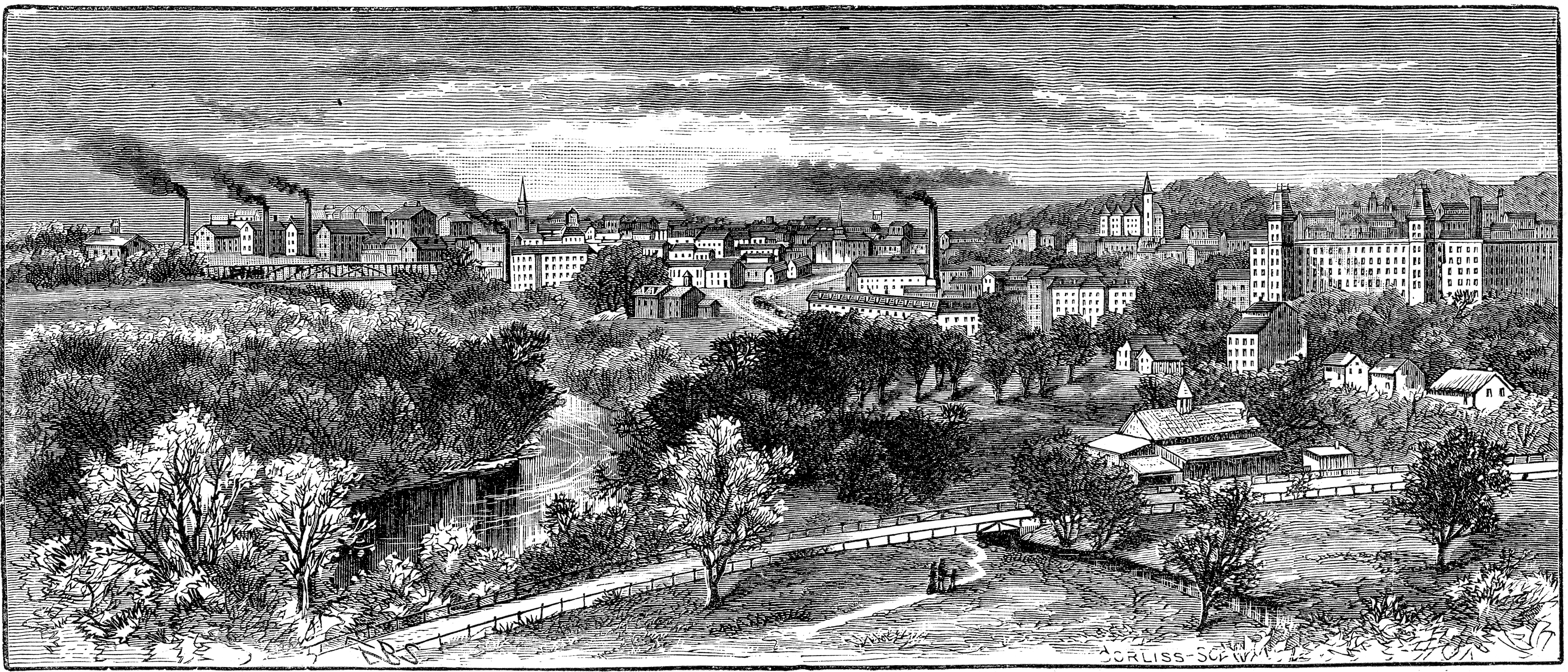
Woonsocket from the East, 1886 engraving

Woonsocket Medical Corporation, founded in 1839 by Dr. Seth Arnold

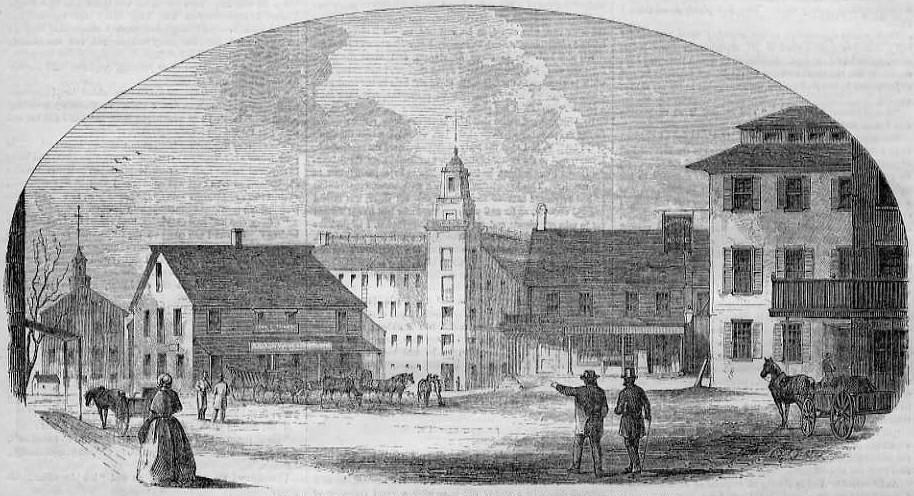
Woonsocket in 1855

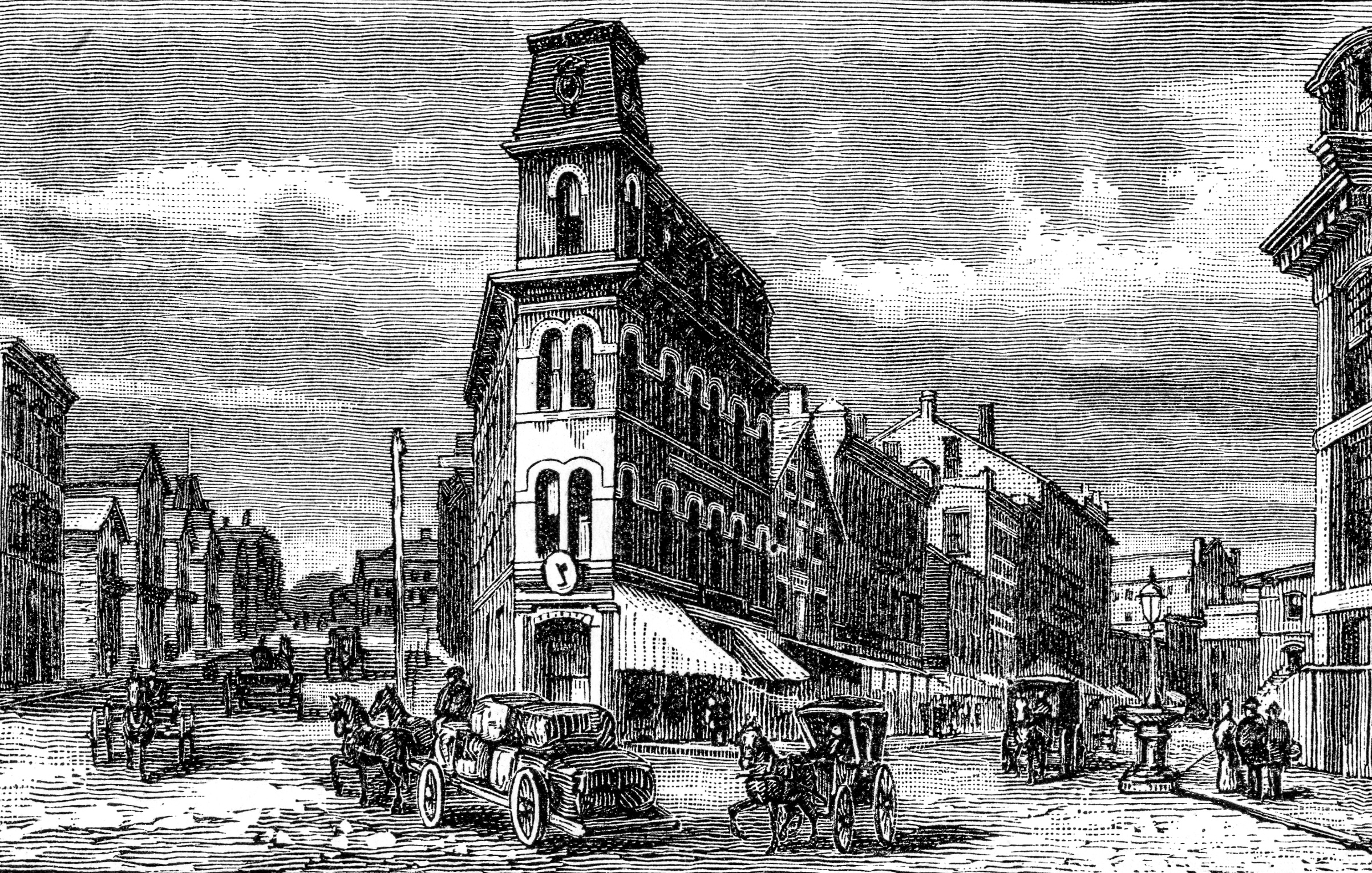
Woonsocket, 1886 engraving

== Geography ==
According to the United States Census Bureau, the city has a total area of 8.0 square miles (21 km^{2}), of which 7.7 square miles (20 km^{2}) is land and 0.3 square miles (0.78 km^{2}) (3.14%) is water. Woonsocket is drained by the Blackstone River. Adjacent communities include Blackstone and Bellingham, Massachusetts, along with Cumberland and North Smithfield, Rhode Island.

=== Climate ===
Woonsocket has a strong humid continental climate (Köppen Dfa) with four distinct seasons. Being influenced by both the sea and the interior during winter, diurnal temperature variation is relatively high, with days most often being above freezing before severe frosts hit at night.

Climate data for Woonsocket, Rhode Island (1991–2020 normals, extremes 1967–present)
Month	Jan	Feb	Mar	Apr	May	Jun	Jul	Aug	Sep	Oct	Nov	Dec	Year
Record high °F (°C)	71 (22)	73 (23)	82 (28)	96 (36)	97 (36)	97 (36)	101 (38)	102 (39)	97 (36)	86 (30)	80 (27)	73 (23)	102 (39)
Mean daily maximum °F (°C)	37.8 (3.2)	39.9 (4.4)	47.3 (8.5)	59.8 (15.4)	69.9 (21.1)	78.5 (25.8)	84.0 (28.9)	82.5 (28.1)	75.4 (24.1)	63.9 (17.7)	53.4 (11.9)	43.0 (6.1)	61.3 (16.3)
Daily mean °F (°C)	28.3 (−2.1)	30.5 (−0.8)	37.8 (3.2)	48.9 (9.4)	58.9 (14.9)	67.9 (19.9)	73.6 (23.1)	72.1 (22.3)	64.9 (18.3)	52.9 (11.6)	43.3 (6.3)	33.8 (1.0)	51.1 (10.6)
Mean daily minimum °F (°C)	18.8 (−7.3)	21.1 (−6.1)	28.2 (−2.1)	38.0 (3.3)	47.9 (8.8)	57.3 (14.1)	63.3 (17.4)	61.7 (16.5)	54.4 (12.4)	42.0 (5.6)	33.2 (0.7)	24.6 (−4.1)	40.9 (4.9)
Record low °F (°C)	−8 (−22)	−11 (−24)	−2 (−19)	18 (−8)	26 (−3)	38 (3)	44 (7)	43 (6)	29 (−2)	18 (−8)	9 (−13)	0 (−18)	−11 (−24)
Average precipitation inches (mm)	4.37 (111)	3.67 (93)	4.89 (124)	4.71 (120)	3.64 (92)	4.26 (108)	3.62 (92)	4.01 (102)	4.17 (106)	5.08 (129)	4.22 (107)	5.27 (134)	51.91 (1,319)
Average snowfall inches (cm)	12.3 (31)	10.7 (27)	7.6 (19)	1.9 (4.8)	0.0 (0.0)	0.0 (0.0)	0.0 (0.0)	0.0 (0.0)	0.0 (0.0)	0.1 (0.25)	1.0 (2.5)	7.9 (20)	41.5 (105)
Average precipitation days (≥ 0.01 in)	11.5	10.1	10.9	11.9	12.8	11.4	10.7	10.3	10.1	11.4	10.2	11.2	132.5
Average snowy days (≥ 0.1 in)	5.2	4.3	2.7	0.4	0.0	0.0	0.0	0.0	0.0	0.0	0.5	3.0	16.1
Source: NOAA

== Demographics ==
Historical population
Census	Pop.	Note	%±
1870	11,527		—
1880	16,050		39.2%
1890	20,830		29.8%
1900	28,204		35.4%
1910	38,126		35.2%
1920	43,496		14.1%
1930	49,376		13.5%
1940	49,303		−0.1%
1950	50,211		1.8%
1960	47,080		−6.2%
1970	46,820		−0.6%
1980	45,914		−1.9%
1990	43,877		−4.4%
2000	43,224		−1.5%
2010	41,186		−4.7%
2020	43,240		5.0%
U.S. Decennial Census

=== 2020 census ===
As of the 2020 census, Woonsocket had a population of 43,240. The population density was 5,582.2 inhabitants per square mile (2,155.3/km^{2}). There were 19,754 housing units at an average density of 2,550.2 per square mile (984.6/km^{2}). The median age was 37.2 years; 21.9% of residents were under the age of 18 and 14.5% of residents were 65 years of age or older. For every 100 females there were 95.4 males, and for every 100 females age 18 and over there were 92.7 males.

100.0% of residents lived in urban areas, while 0.0% lived in rural areas.

Racial composition as of the 2020 census
Race	Number	Percent
White	27,850	64.4%
Black or African American	3,399	7.9%
American Indian and Alaska Native	267	0.6%
Asian	2,502	5.8%
Native Hawaiian and Other Pacific Islander	28	0.1%
Some other race	4,167	9.6%
Two or more races	5,027	11.6%
Hispanic or Latino (of any race)	9,086	21.0%

There were 18,287 households in Woonsocket, of which 27.8% had children under the age of 18 living in them. Of all households, 30.2% were married-couple households, 24.7% were households with a male householder and no spouse or partner present, and 33.9% were households with a female householder and no spouse or partner present. About 34.6% of all households were made up of individuals and 11.1% had someone living alone who was 65 years of age or older.

The average household size was 2.5 and the average family size was 3.2.

The percent of those with a bachelor’s degree or higher was estimated to be 12.4% of the population.

The 2016–2020 5-year American Community Survey estimates show that the median household income was $44,310 (with a margin of error of +/− $2,816) and the median family income was $55,818 (+/− $4,785). Males had a median income of $38,889 (+/− $2,065) versus $27,544 (+/− $2,343) for females. The median income for those above 16 years old was $33,424 (+/− $2,183). Approximately, 15.0% of families and 21.0% of the population were below the poverty line, including 34.8% of those under the age of 18 and 15.1% of those ages 65 or over.

=== 2010 census ===
At the 2010 census Woonsocket had a population of 41,186. The population was 71.3% non-Hispanic white, 14.2% Hispanic or Latino, 6.4% African American, 5.4% Asian, 0.4% Native American and 4.3% reporting two or more races.

=== 2000 census ===
At the 2000 census, there were 43,224 people, 17,750 households, and 10,774 families residing in the city. The population density was 5,608.8 inhabitants per square mile (2,165.6/km^{2}). There were 18,757 housing units at an average density of 2,433.9 per square mile (939.7/km^{2}). The racial makeup of the city was 83.14% White, 4.44% African American, 0.32% Native American, 4.06% Asian, 0.03% Pacific Islander, 4.86% from other races, and 3.14% from two or more races. Hispanic or Latino of any race were 9.32% of the population.

Woonsocket is a part of the Providence metropolitan area, which has an estimated population of 1,622,520.

There were 17,750 households, out of which 31.2% had children under the age of 18 living with them, 39.4% were married couples living together, 16.2% had a female householder with no husband present, and 39.3% were non-families. Of all households, 32.7% were made up of individuals, and 12.5% had someone living alone who was 65 years of age or older. The average household size was 2.37 and the average family size was 3.02.

In the city, the population was spread out, with 25.8% under the age of 18, 9.2% from 18 to 24, 30.0% from 25 to 44, 19.7% from 45 to 64, and 15.2% who were 65 years of age or older. The median age was 35 years. For every 100 females, there were 91.2 males. For every 100 females age 18 and over, there were 86.8 males.

The median income for a household in the city was $30,819, and the median income for a family was $38,353. Males had a median income of $31,465 versus $24,638 for females. The per capita income for the city was $16,223. About 16.7% of families and 19.4% of the population were below the poverty line, including 31.3% of those under age 18 and 14.7% of those age 65 or over. In March 2013, The Washington Post reported that one-third of Woonsocket's population used food stamps, putting local merchants on a "boom or bust" cycle each month when EBT payments were deposited.

At the 2000 census, 46.1% of Woonsocket's population were identified as being of French or French-Canadian ethnic heritage. The city has referred to itself as La ville la plus française aux États-Unis, 'the most French city in the United States'.

== Arts and culture ==
=== Historic sites ===
Properties and districts in Woonsocket listed on National Register of Historic Places:

- 1761 Milestone
- Allen Street Historic District
- Alphonse Gaulin Jr. House (1885)
- Bernon Worsted Mill (1919)
- Cato Hill Historic District
- Frank Wilbur House (1923)
- Glenark Mills (1865)
- Grove Street Elementary School (1876)
- Hanora Mills (1827)
- Harris Warehouse (1855)
- Henry Darling House (1865)
- Honan's Block and 112–114 Main Street (1879)
- Hope Street School (1899)
- Island Place Historic District
- Jenckes Mansion (1828)
- John Arnold House (1712)
- L'Eglise du Precieux Sang (1873)
- Linton Block (1888)
- Logee House (1729)
- Main Street Historic District
- North End Historic District
- Philmont Worsted Company Mill (1919)
- Pothier House (1881)
- Smith-Ballou House (1906)
- Smithfield Friends Meeting House, Parsonage and Cemetery (1719/1881)
- South Main Street Historic District
- St. Andrews Episcopal Chapel (1894)
- St. Ann's Church Complex (1913)
- St. Charles Borromeo Church Complex (1867)
- Stadium Building (1925)
- Union Village Historic District
- Woonsocket City Hall (1856)
- Woonsocket Civil War Monument (1868)
- Woonsocket Company Mill Complex
- Woonsocket Depot Square (1847)
- Woonsocket District Courthouse (1894)
- Woonsocket Rubber Company Mill (1857)

== Notable people ==
- Greg Abate, jazz musician
- Norm Abram, master carpenter, TV host/personality
- Nicholas Alahverdian, child welfare reform advocate, scammer, and convicted sex offender
- Jonathan Earle Arnold, politician
- Lisa Baldelli-Hunt, politician
- Rocco Baldelli, former baseball player and former manager of the Minnesota Twins
- Latimer Whipple Ballou, congressman
- Bryan Berard, hockey player
- Brian Boucher, hockey player
- Josephine Byrd, civil rights activist
- Charls Carroll, comedian
- Percy Daniels, populist politician
- Marcel Desaulniers, chef
- Eddie Dowling, actor, screenwriter and songwriter
- Allen Doyle, golfer
- Denise Duhamel, poet
- Susan Eisenberg, voice artist
- Eileen Farrell, opera soprano
- Marie Rose Ferron, stigmatist
- Ernest Fortin, theology professor
- Stuart Gitlow, physician
- Edward Harris, manufacturer, philanthropist, and abolitionist
- Gabby Hartnett, baseball player and manager
- Michelle Holzapfel, woodworking artist
- Ambrose Kennedy, congressman
- Clem Labine, baseball player
- Nap Lajoie (1874-1959), baseball player
- Neil Lanctot, historian and author
- Francis Leo Lawrence (1937–2013), college president
- William C. Lovering, congressman
- James McAndrews, congressman
- J. Howard McGrath, politician
- Dave McKenna, jazz pianist
- Susan Menard, politician
- Isabelle Ahearn O'Neill, Rhode Island's first woman legislator
- Edwin O'Connor, radio personality and novelist
- Aram J. Pothier, governor
- Duke Robillard, blues guitarist
- Christopher Robinson, congressman
- Nick Rochefort, comedian
- Mathieu Schneider, NHL hockey player
- Andre Soukhamthath, mixed martial artist
- Bill Summers, umpire

== Filming location ==
Woonsocket has served as a filming location for several movies, including Lost in Woonsocket (2007), Hachi: A Dog's Tale (2009), and The Purge: Election Year (2016).

== See also ==
- Woonsocket High School
- Woonsocket station
