= Oliver W. Fontaine =

American architect

Oliver Walter Fontaine
- Born: November 27, 1900; Woonsocket, Rhode Island
- Occupation: Architect

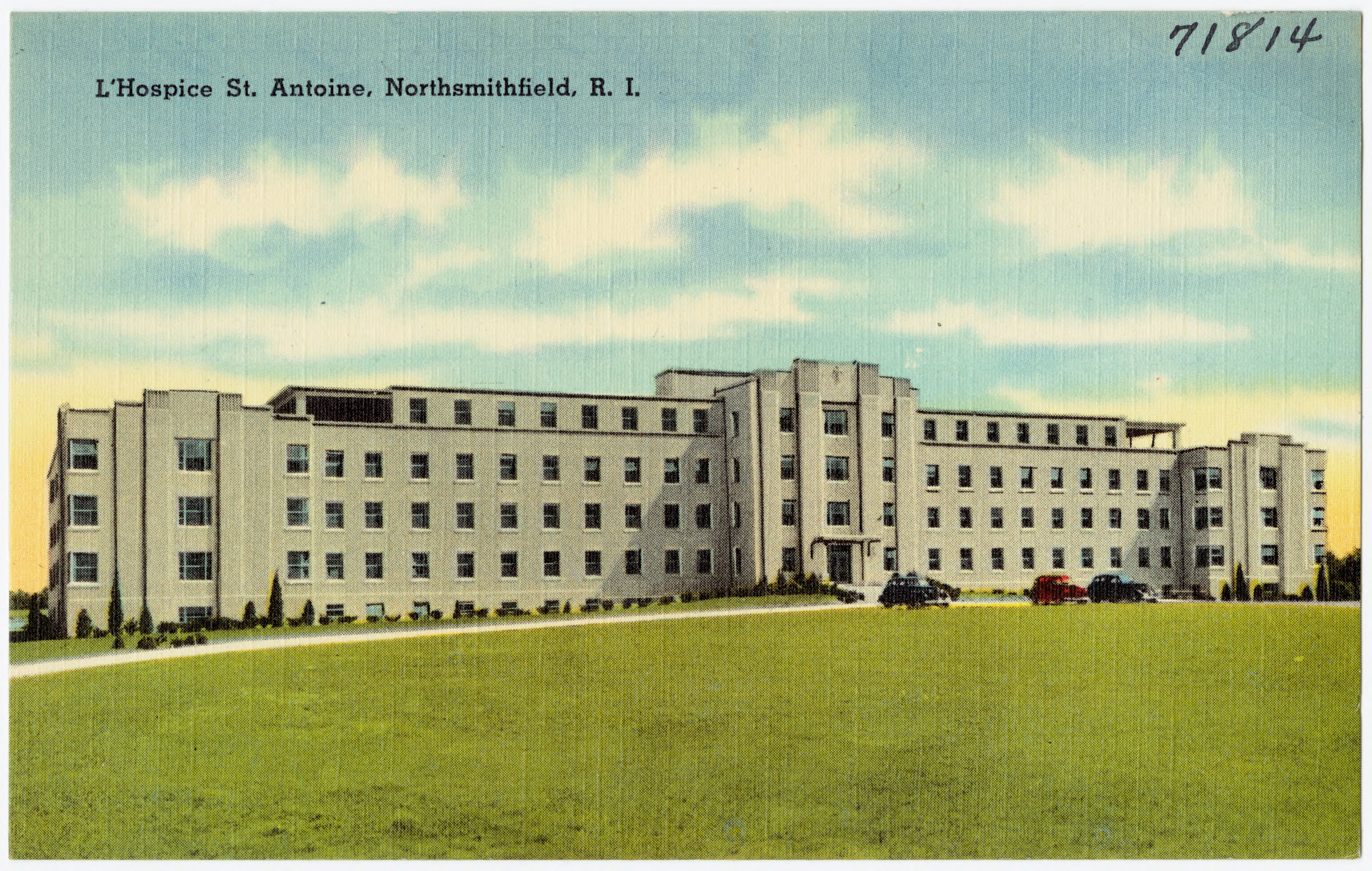
St. Antoine Hospice, North Smithfield, 1939.

Oliver W. Fontaine (born 1900) was an American architect from Woonsocket, Rhode Island.

== Biography ==
Oliver Fontaine was born in late 1900 in Woonsocket, Rhode Island to local architect Walter F. Fontaine, then at the beginning of his successful career. He attended the Lowell Textile School, and entered the Fontaine office in 1921, along with his brother, Paul N. Fontaine. In 1935 they were admitted to the firm as partners, as Walter F. Fontaine & Sons. The partnership remained until 1938, when Walter Fontaine died when the Hurricane of 1938 destroyed the family summer home. The firm, now Walter F. Fontaine, Inc., existed until 1942, when Paul joined the war effort.

Upon his brother's departure, Oliver Fontaine established his own Woonsocket office. He practiced alone until 1967, when he added Charles Seavor as partner. Seavor had been a designer in the office since at least 1963, and would lead the office in the 1970s.

Architect Joseph M. Mosher also worked for the Fontaine office in the 1930s and 1940s.

== Architectural works ==
=== Walter F. Fontaine, Inc., 1938–1942 ===
- 1939 – St. Antoine Hospice, 10 Rhodes Ave, North Smithfield, Rhode Island
  - Demolished.
- 1940 – Morin Heights, Woonsocket, Rhode Island
- 1941 – Convent for St. Aloysius R. C. Church, 323 Rathbun St, Woonsocket, Rhode Island
- 1942 – Bristol Worsted Mills, 345 Thames St, Bristol, Rhode Island

=== Oliver W. Fontaine, 1942–1967 ===
- 1948 – Barry Memorial Field, 44 Smithfield Rd, Woonsocket, Rhode Island
- 1950 – Woonsocket High School Gymnasium, 357 Park Pl, Woonsocket, Rhode Island
- 1952 – Ste Jeanne d'Arc School, 68 Dracut St, Lowell, Massachusetts
- 1955 – St. Louis de France R. C. Church, 221 W 6th St, Lowell, Massachusetts
- 1955 – St. Mary's R. C. School, 30 Broad St, Marlborough, Massachusetts
- 1959 – St. James R. C. School, 57 Division St, Manville, Rhode Island
- 1960 – St. Joseph's R. C. School, 1210 Mendon Rd, Woonsocket, Rhode Island
- 1961 – St. Blaise R. C. Church, 1158 S Main St, Bellingham, Massachusetts
- 1961 – St. Frances Xavier Cabrini R. C. Church, 27 Hood Rd, North Scituate, Massachusetts
- 1962 – St. Anne R. C. School, 20 Como Rd, Hyde Park, Massachusetts
- 1963 – Hope Library, 374 North Rd, Hope, Rhode Island
- 1964 – St. Vincent de Paul R. C. School, 6 St Vincent de Paul St, Anthony, Rhode Island
- 1964 – Ste. Chretienne Academy (Former), 11 Harrison Rd, Salem, Massachusetts
  - Now part of the south campus of Salem State University.
- 1966 – Convent for St. Joseph's R. C. Church, 22 Lyman St, Waltham, Massachusetts
  - Demolished.

=== Oliver W. Fontaine Associates, from 1967 ===
- 1969 – Joseph L. McCourt Middle School, 45 Highland Ave, Cumberland, Rhode Island

=== Seavor Associates ===
- 1974 – Our Lady, Queen of Martyrs, R. C. Church, 1409 Park Ave, Woonsocket, Rhode Island
- 1974 – Marquette Credit Union Building, 191 Social St, Woonsocket, Rhode Island
  - To this day, this is the tallest building in Woonsocket.
