= Willard Kent =

American architect

Willard C. Kent
- Born: October 27, 1851; Marshfield, Massachusetts
- Died: 1924; Narragansett Pier, Rhode Island
- Occupation: Architect
- Buildings: Woonsocket Opera House

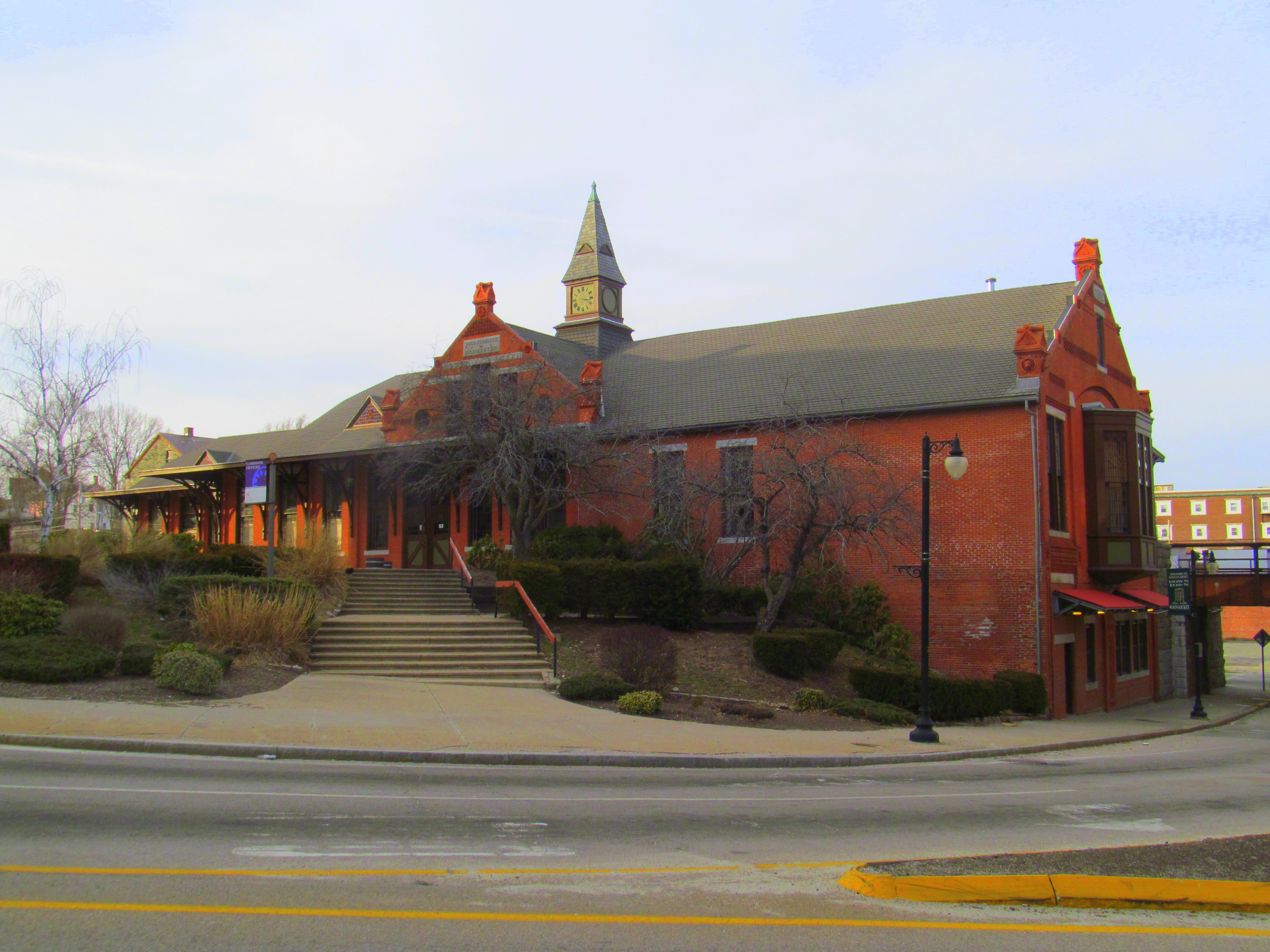
Woonsocket Depot, Woonsocket, 1882.

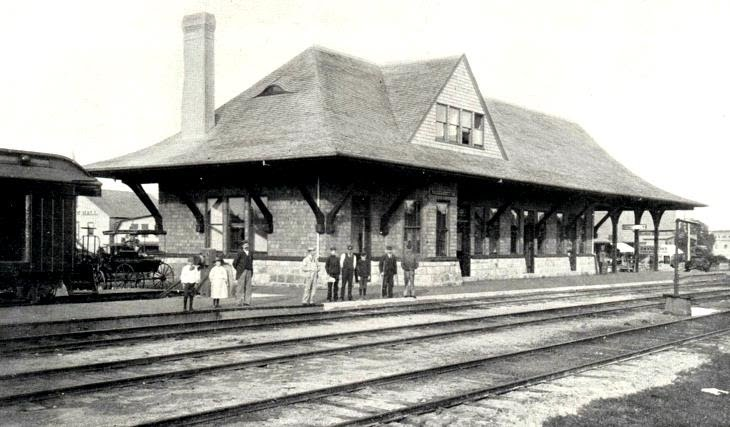
Station, Narragansett Pier, 1896.

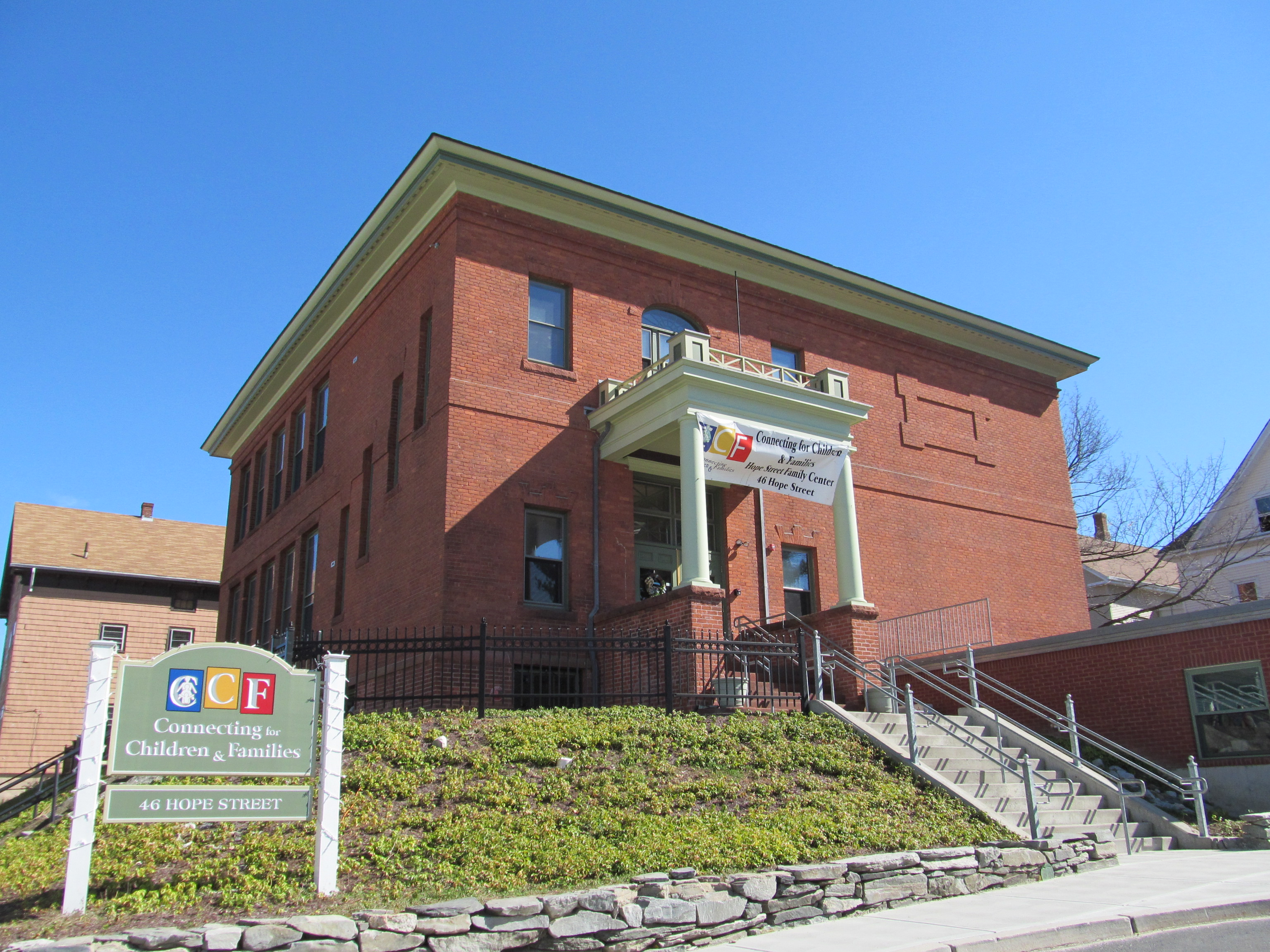
Hope Street School, Woonsocket, 1899.

Willard Kent (1851–1924) was an architect and engineer of Woonsocket, Rhode Island.

== Life and career ==
He was born on October 27, 1851, in Marshfield, Massachusetts. His parents were Warren Kent, a builder, and Eliza Weston Kent.

As a young man in 1875, Kent took a job with John W. Ellis, a Woonsocket engineer who was also the chief engineer of the Providence & Worcester Railroad. In that capacity, Ellis was responsible for the design and construction of the local train station (1882), and Kent may have thus had a hand in the design. He remained with Ellis until 1884, when he opened an office in Woonsocket for the practice of engineering. Later in the 1880s he expanded his practice to include architecture. Later he opened an office in Narragansett Pier, where he would eventually also live on a permanent basis.

Kent is also notable as the teacher of Walter F. Fontaine. Kent also trained Roland A. Thayer, an important member of Lockwood, Greene & Co., from 1891 to 1896.

== Work ==
As an architect, Kent generally remained in the mainstream. His early works were in the Romanesque Revival, Queen Anne, and Shingle styles. In the 1890s he utilized the Colonial Revival, and his latest works trended toward the eclectic. Perhaps his most important building was the Woonsocket Opera House, begun in 1887 and completed the following year. The building was used for many functions aside from its auditorium, including functioning as an annex to the Monument House, a neighboring hotel. Lysander W. Elliott, owner of the hotel, also managed the opera house. Designed in the Romanesque style, it was one of the largest buildings yet built in the city. While restoration was being planned, it was destroyed by a fire in 1975.

A contemporary, but rural, example of Kent's work is the Rocky Brook Reservoir Pumping Station in Peace Dale, which still stands. In his book Buildings of Rhode Island, architectural historian William H. Jordy calls it "a picturesque attempt for industrial rusticity". The building reuses many of the design moves Kent made in the opera House, but in a more laid back, playful way. It was designed and built in 1889.

A later work is the Hope Street School, in the Constitution Hill neighborhood of Woonsocket. Unlike his ornate designs of the 1880s, his work in the 1890s was often marked by severe simplicity. This is exemplified in this school, where the only major ornamental elements are the Doric portico and the heavy cornice. Other than this, the design relies on window openings for architectural interest.

== List of works ==
- 1882 - Woonsocket Depot, 1 Depot Sq, Woonsocket, Rhode Island
  - A contributing resource to the NRHP-listed Main Street Historic District.
- 1883 - Willard Kent house, 21 Summer St, Woonsocket, Rhode Island
  - A contributing resource to the NRHP-listed North End Historic District.
- 1887 - Woonsocket Opera House, 37 N Main St, Woonsocket, Rhode Island
  - Burned in 1975.
- 1889 - Rocky Brook Reservoir Pumping Station, 1464 Kingstown Rd, Peace Dale, Rhode Island
- 1896 - Narragansett Pier Railroad Station, 145 Boon St, Narragansett Pier, Rhode Island
- 1897 - Willard Kent house, 203 Providence St, Woonsocket, Rhode Island
- 1898 - George W. Cresson cottage, Rose Lea, 410 Ocean Rd, Narragansett Pier, Rhode Island
  - A contributing resource to the NRHP-listed Ocean Road Historic District.
- 1898 - Willard Kent cottage, Four Gables, 12 S Pier Rd, Narragansett Pier, Rhode Island
- 1899 - Hope Street School (former), 40 Hope St, Woonsocket, Rhode Island
  - NRHP-listed.
- 1904 - Masonic Temple, 64 Columbia St, Wakefield, Rhode Island
  - Designed by Willard Kent, architect, with W. Howard Walker, advisory architect. Demolished.
- 1917 - Joel N. Bense house, 103 Glen Rd, Woonsocket, Rhode Island
  - A contributing resource to the NRHP-listed North End Historic District.
- 1924 - Fifth Avenue School, 25 5th Ave, Narragansett Pier, Rhode Island
  - This building currently serves as the Town Hall.
