= Hope Street School =

- U.S. National Register of Historic Places
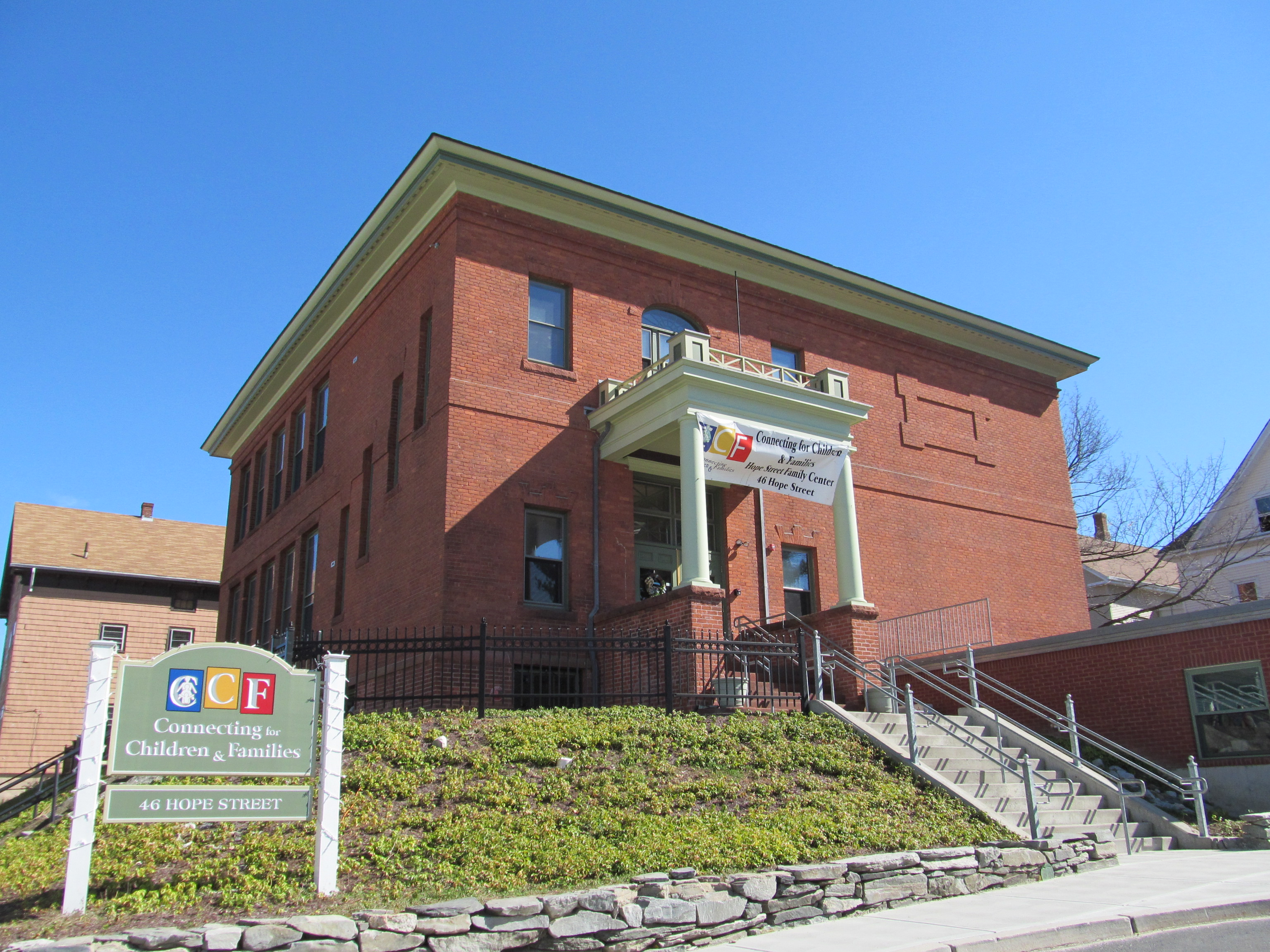
- Hope Street School

- Location within Rhode Island Location within the United States
- Location: Woonsocket, Rhode Island
- Coordinates: 41°59′58″N 71°31′12″W
- Built: 1899
- Architect: Kent, Willard; Norton & Kennedy
- NRHP reference No.: 00000383
- Added to NRHP: April 14, 2000

The Hope Street School is an historic school building at 46 Hope Street in Woonsocket, Rhode Island. The 2 1/2-story brick school building was designed by Willard Kent and built in 1899 by Norton & Kennedy. Its western entrance has a wooden portico supported by Doric columns; a similar portico on its eastern entrance was removed. The building was used as a public school until 1978.

The building was listed on the National Register of Historic Places in 2000.

== See also ==
- National Register of Historic Places listings in Providence County, Rhode Island
