= French Worsted Company Mill Historic District =

Historic district in Rhode Island, United States

- U.S. National Register of Historic Places
- U.S. Historic district
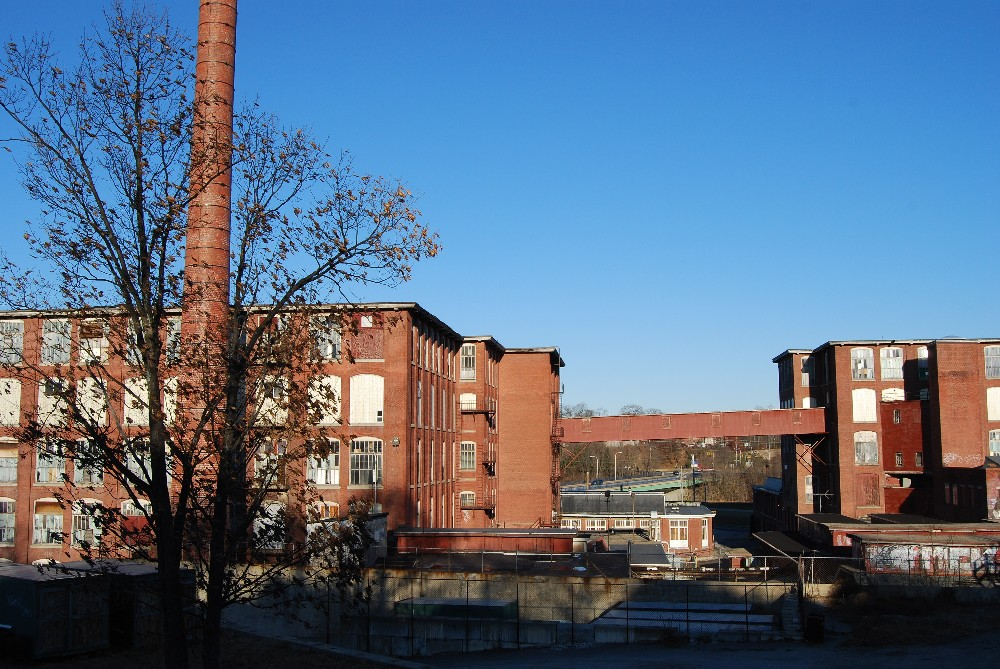

- Location within Rhode Island Location within the United States
- Nearest city: Woonsocket, Rhode Island
- Area: 6.7 acres (2.7 ha)
- Built: 1906-1939
- Architect: Fontaine & Kinnicutt
- NRHP reference No.: 08000453
- Added to NRHP: May 21, 2008

The French Worsted Company Mill Historic District encompassed a historic mill complex in Woonsocket, Rhode Island. Bounded by Hamlet Avenue, Davison Avenue, and Manville Road, a complex of sixteen brick buildings was built between 1906 and the late 1920s. The complex was home to the French Worsted Company, a manufacturer established with funds from French investors brought over by Aram Pothier, the Quebec-born mayor of Woonsocket. The company engaged in the manufacture of fine worsted wool yarns. The company survived the Great Depression and competition from Southern mills, but finally failed in 1969. The buildings were then converted to a variety of light manufacturing interests.

The mill district was added to the National Register of Historic Places on May 21, 2008. It was demolished in 2012.
