= St. Matthew's Church (Central Falls, Rhode Island) =

Historic church in Rhode Island, United States

- U.S. National Register of Historic Places
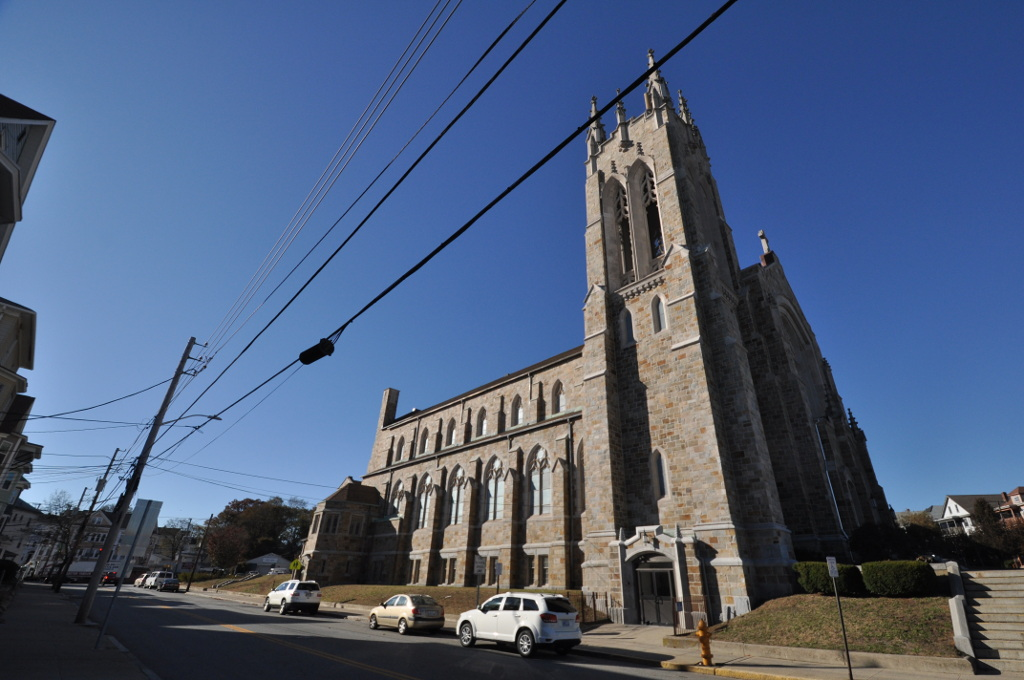
- The church in November 2017

- Location within Rhode Island Location within the United States
- Location: 1030 Dexter St., Central Falls, Rhode Island
- Coordinates: 41°53′21″N 71°24′7″W
- Built: 1929
- Architect: Walter F. Fontaine
- Architectural style: Late Gothic Revival
- MPS: Central Falls MRA
- NRHP reference No.: 79000008
- Added to NRHP: April 6, 1979

St. Matthew's Church, currently known as the Holy Spirit Parish, is an historic Roman Catholic church at 1030 Dexter Street in Central Falls, Rhode Island located within the Diocese of Providence.

== Description ==
The stone church was designed by Walter F. Fontaine and completed in 1929. Its design was based on French Gothic styling. It is built of Weymouth granite, with limestone trim. The interior is richly decorated, and features artwork by Guido Nincheri and stained glass windows by Mommejean de Paris. The church was built to serve the growing French-Canadian population of Central Falls.

The church was listed on the National Register of Historic Places in 1979.

== See also ==
- Catholic Church in the United States
- Catholic parish church
- Index of Catholic Church articles
- National Register of Historic Places listings in Providence County, Rhode Island
- Pastoral care
