= Sacred Heart Parish Complex (Lawrence, Massachusetts) =

- U.S. National Register of Historic Places
- U.S. Historic district
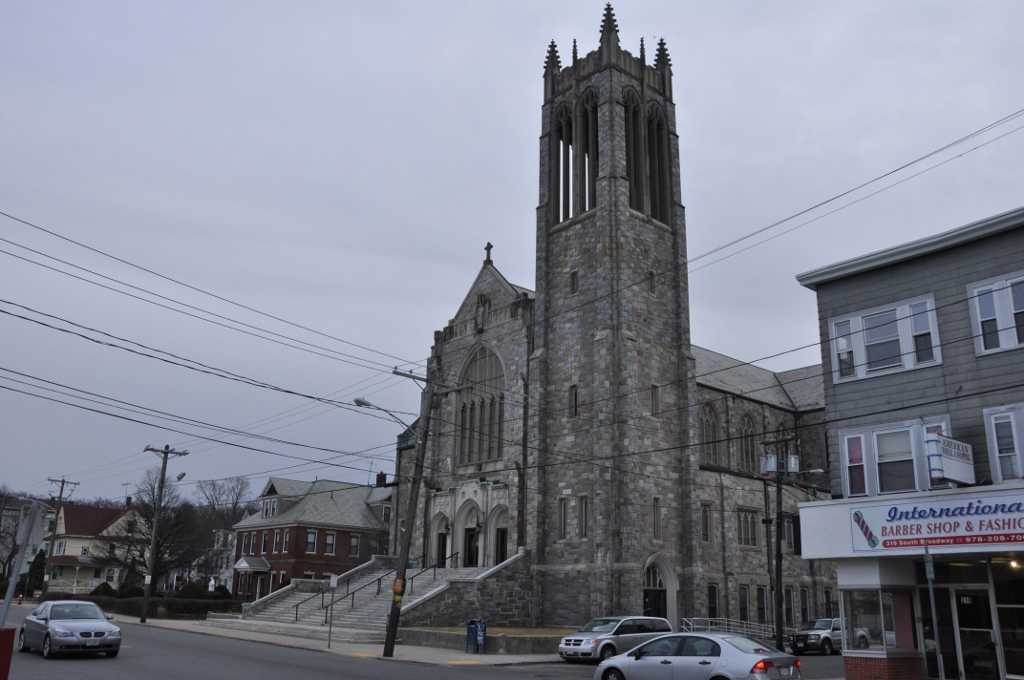

- Location within Massachusetts Location within the United States
- Location: 321 S. Broadway, Lawrence, Massachusetts
- Coordinates: 42°41′22″N 71°9′32″W
- Area: 2 acres (0.81 ha)
- Built: 1899-1925
- Architect: Walter F. Fontaine; Joseph G. Morissette
- Architectural style: Romanesque Revival; Gothic Revival; Colonial Revival
- NRHP reference No.: 11000853
- Added to NRHP: November 29, 2011

The Sacred Heart Parish Complex is a historic former Roman Catholic church complex located at 321 S. Broadway in Lawrence, Massachusetts. It consists of five buildings built between 1899 and 1936, including a fine Gothic Revival stone church. A historic district encompassing the complex was listed on the National Register of Historic Places on November 29, 2011. The complex was sold by the Roman Catholic Archdiocese of Boston in 2004 in order to help pay for the liabilities related to the sex abuse scandal, payouts for the scandal so far is approximately $4,000,000,000 (4 billion) church wide.

== Description and history ==
The Sacred Heart complex is located in South Lawrence, on the west side of South Broadway, the major north-south artery through the area. It covers about 2 acres (0.81 ha) between Groton and Hawley Streets, occupying all but the western part of a complete city block. The complex includes five buildings: two schools (one Romanesque Revival built 1899, the other Colonial Revival built 1926), and a convent (1920), rectory (1924), and church (1935–36). The church was designed by Woonsocket, Rhode Island architect Walter F. Fontaine in association with Joseph G. Morissette of Lawrence. The schools and rectory are built out of brick, while the convent is stuccoed on the exterior, and the church is an elaborate example of Gothic Revival architecture in multicolored ashlar granite.

Between the 1899 school and the convent is a small grotto that is also part of the complex. In 2004 the Catholic church consolidated seven parishes in Lawrence down to three, and this complex was sold to Sagrado Corazon LLC. The schools and convent have been converted to residential use, while the church and rectory are leased to a sedevacantist Traditionalist Catholic Dominican order. The complex as of 2017 is a vibrant traditional Catholic community. Restoration of the Church and rectory is on-going and a new brick cloister garden area has recently been built.

== See also ==
- National Register of Historic Places listings in Lawrence, Massachusetts
