= Walter F. Fontaine =

American architect

Walter Francis Fontaine
- Born: January 12, 1871; Fitchburg, Massachusetts
- Died: September 21, 1938 (aged 67); Charlestown, Rhode Island
- Occupation: Architect
- Spouse: Obeline Lucier Fontaine
- Practice: Stone, Carpenter & Willson; Fontaine & Kinnicutt; Walter F. Fontaine & Sons

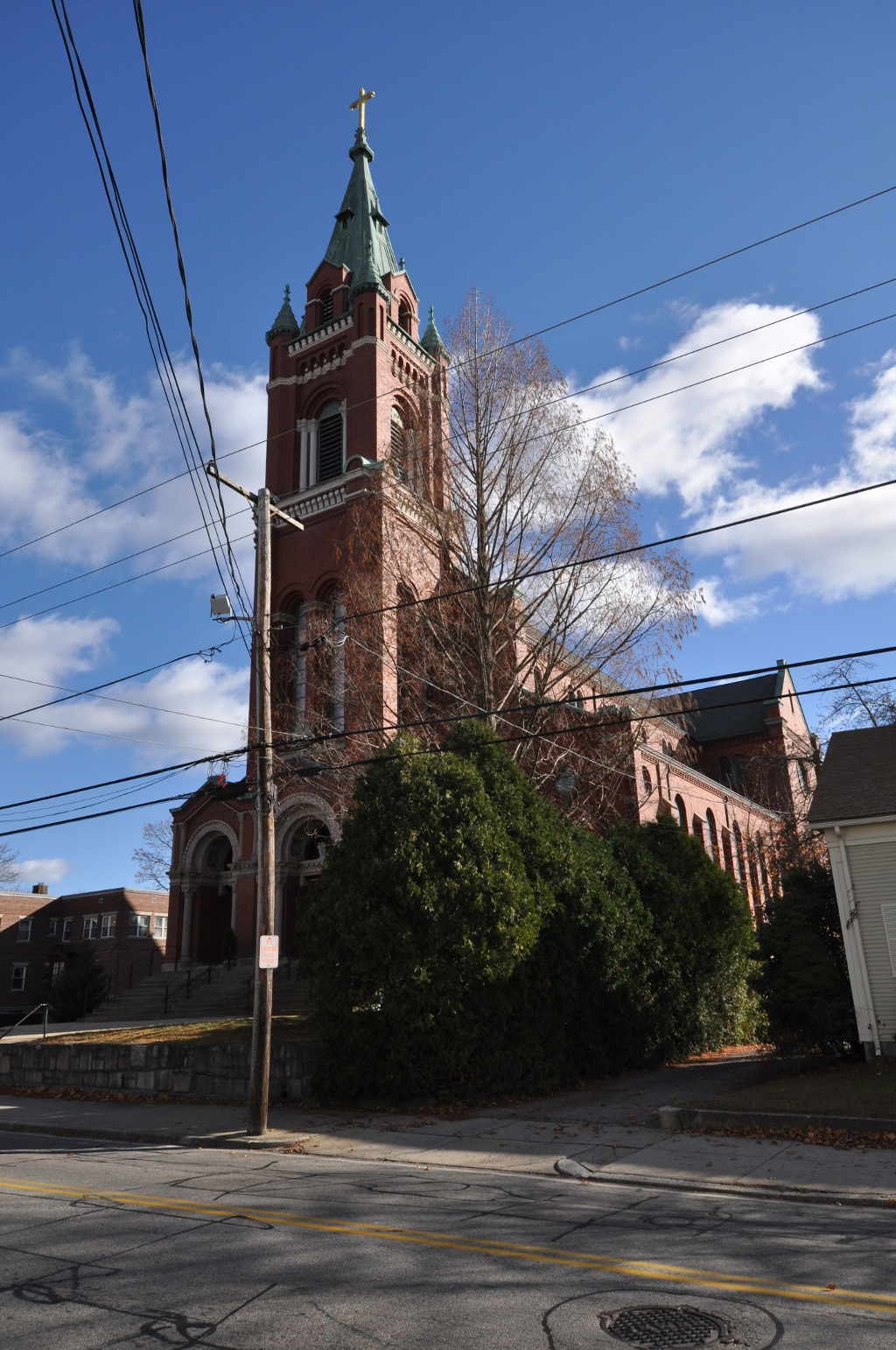
Holy Family Church, Woonsocket, 1909.

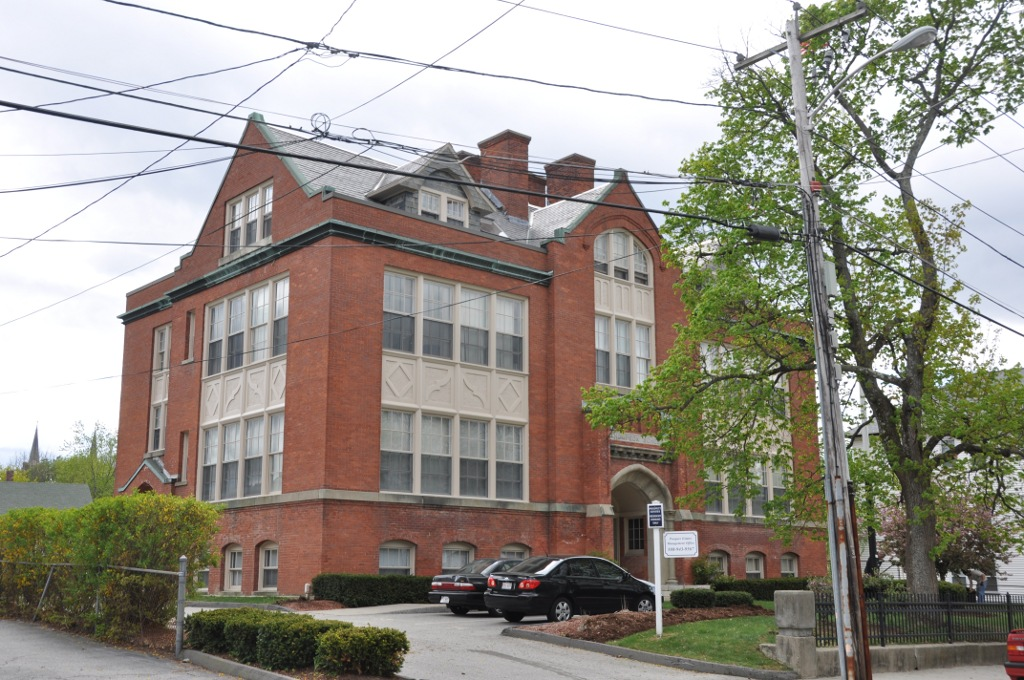
Thompson School, Webster, 1912.

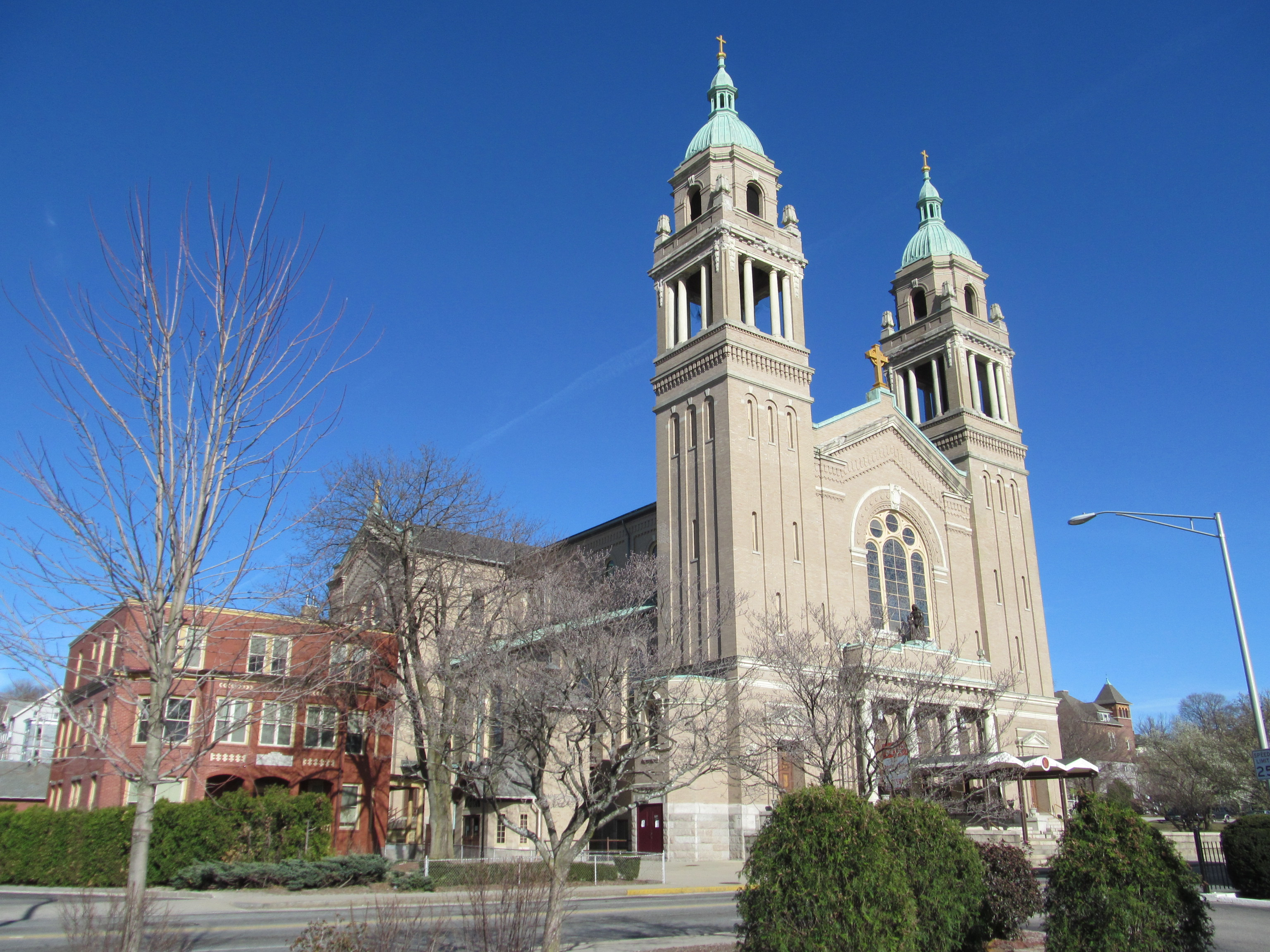
St. Ann's Church, Woonsocket, 1913.

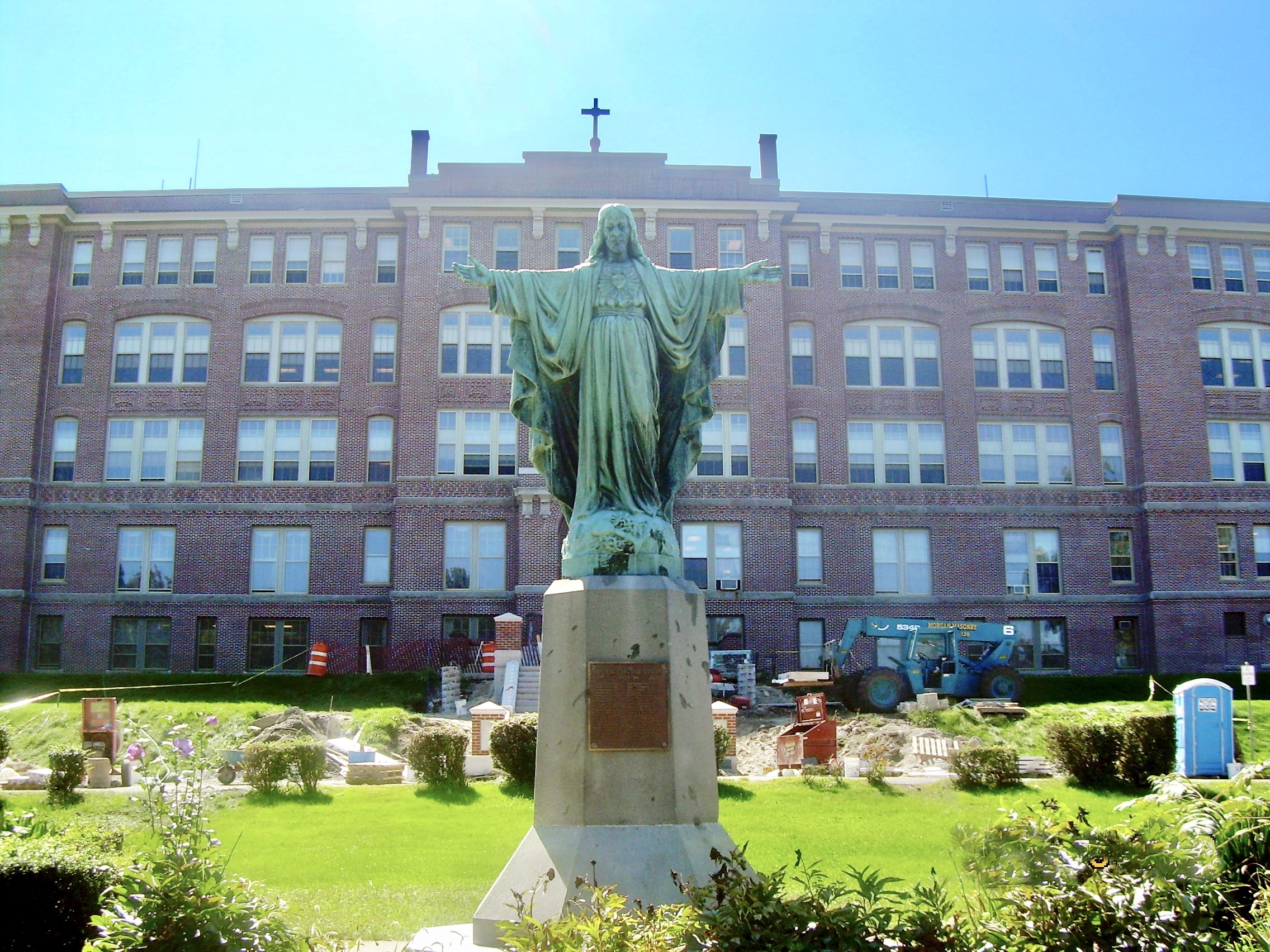
Mount St. Charles Academy, Woonsocket, 1922.

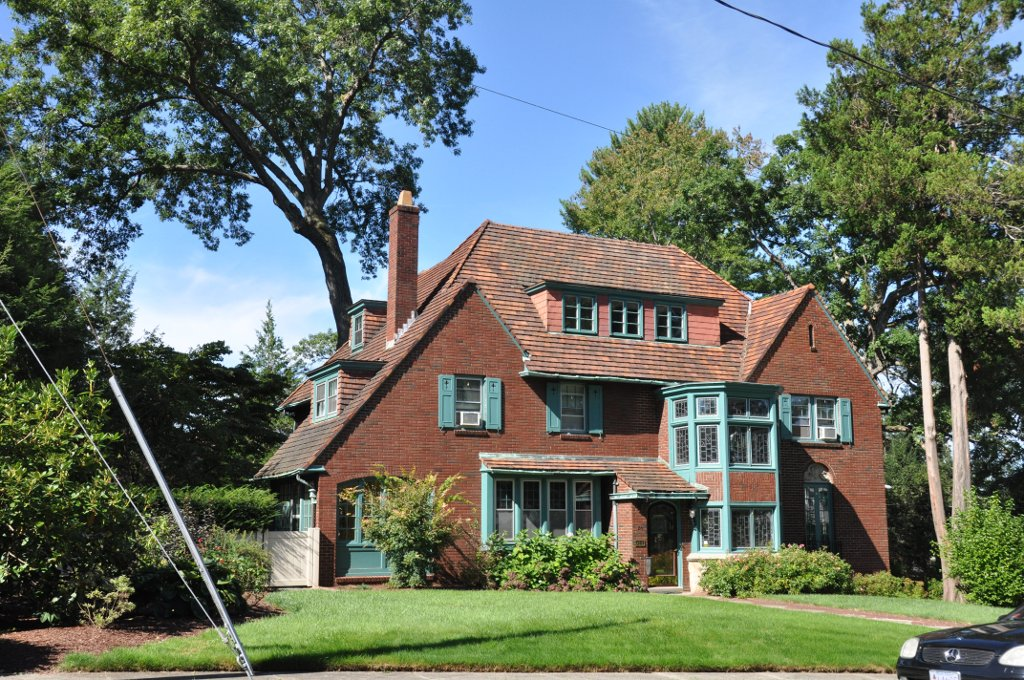
W. F. Fontaine House, Woonsocket, 1925.

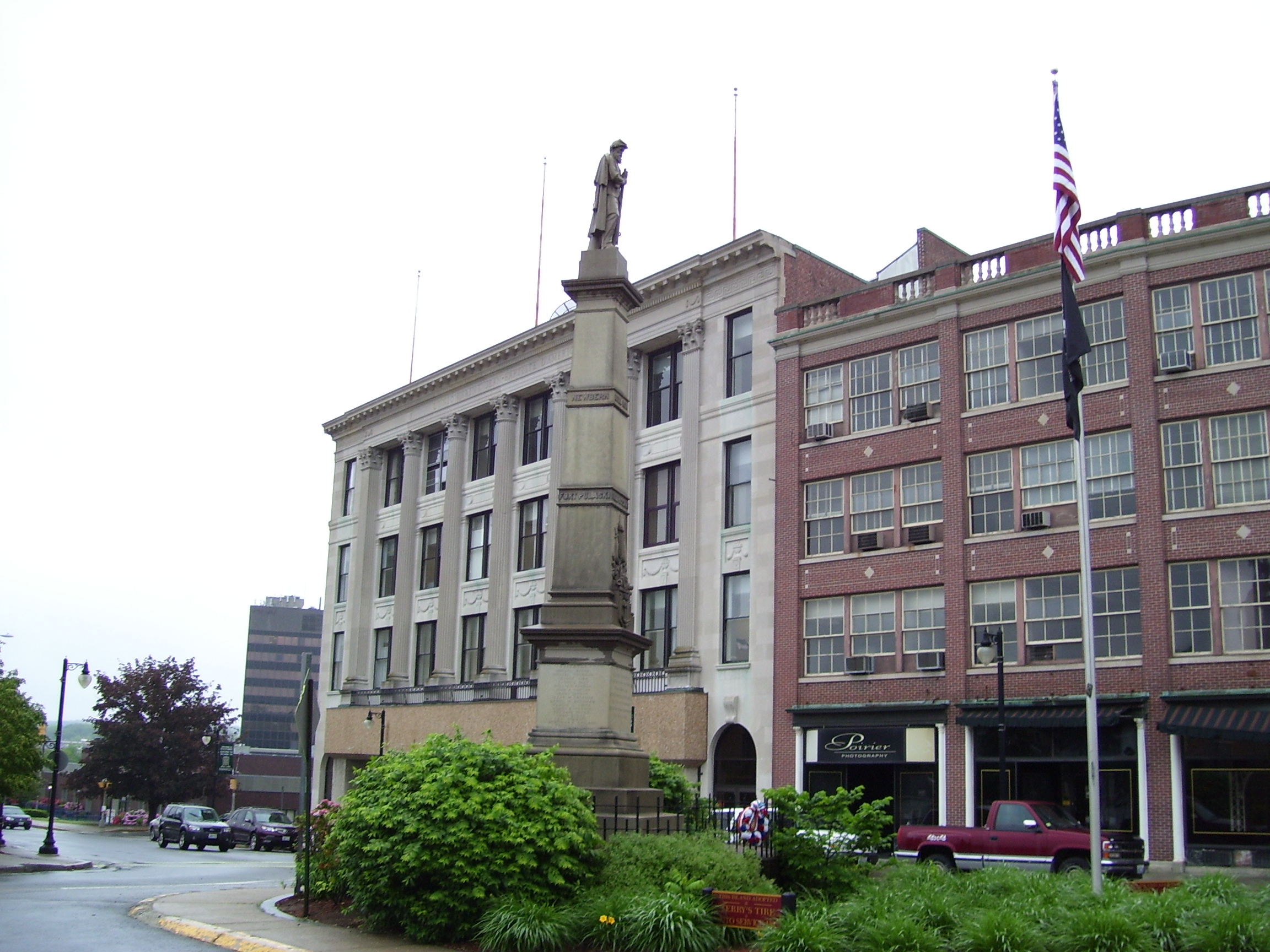
Union St.-Jean Baptiste d'Amerique Building, Woonsocket, 1926.

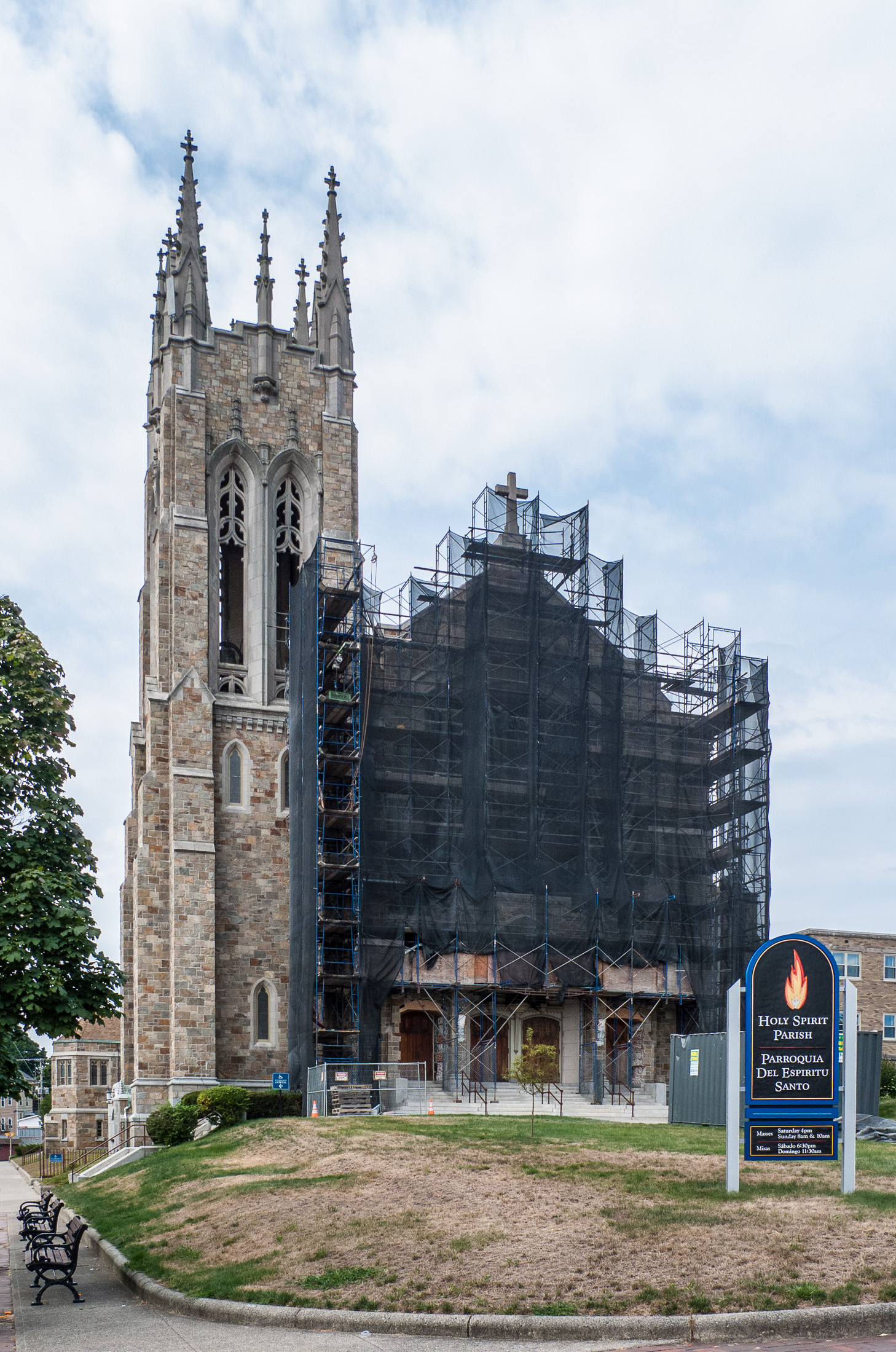
St. Matthew's Church, Central Falls, 1929.

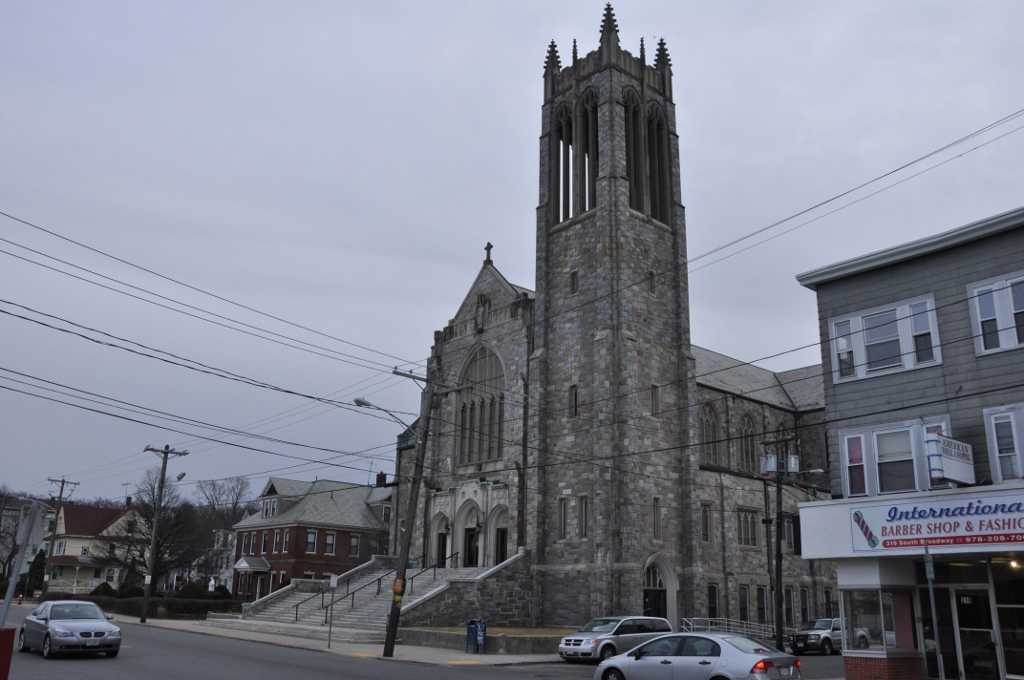
Sacred Heart Church, Lawrence, 1934.

Walter F. Fontaine (January 12, 1871 – September 21, 1938) was an American architect of French Heritage from Woonsocket, Rhode Island.

== Early life ==
Fontaine was born in Fitchburg, Massachusetts in 1871 to parents that had moved there from Woonsocket. When he was a young child, his family moved back to Woonsocket, where his father, John B. Fontaine (1836-1895) was a prominent building contractor.

He was educated in the local schools, and began his architectural training in 1887 in the office of Willard Kent, a local architect.

== Career ==
After additional training in Europe in 1893, he worked for the Providence firm of Stone, Carpenter & Willson. Near the end of his time there, he was responsible for the construction supervision of that firm's Providence Public Library and Union Trust Co. Building.

In 1901 he returned to Woonsocket where he opened his own office. Beginning in 1903, he worked with Elmer H. Kinnicutt as Fontaine & Kinnicutt. This association ended upon Kinnicutt's death in January 1910. In 1921, his two sons, Oliver W. and Paul N. Fontaine began working for him. By this time Joseph M. Mosher was also associated with the office. In 1935, both sons became partners in the newly reorganized firm of Walter F. Fontaine & Sons. It remained as such until the elder Fontaine's death.

Fontaine was a member of the AIA and served for a time as Vice President of the Rhode Island chapter. He was also a member of the Rhode Island State Planning Board.

=== Legacy ===
After their father's death, his sons reorganized the firm as Walter F. Fontaine, Inc. It remained as such until 1942, when Paul left to participate in the war effort. In his brother's absence, Oliver opened his own office, which remained active into the 1970s. Several of his buildings have been included in the National Register of Historic Places.

== Personal life ==
Fontaine and his wife, Obeline Lucier Fontaine (1869–1938), died during the Hurricane of 1938 at their summer home in Charlestown, Rhode Island.

== Architectural works ==
While in private practice, 1901-1903:

- Commercial Block, 99-113 Main St., Woonsocket, RI (1902)
- Central Police Station (Former), 139 Front St., Woonsocket, RI (1903)

Fontaine & Kinnicutt, 1903-1910:

- St. Mary R. C. Church, 46 Valley St., Willimantic, CT (1903) - This church suffered a major fire in May 2013, but expects to rebuild.
- St. Aloysius R. C. Church, 2 Beck St., Newburyport, MA (1904)
- Malcolm Campbell House, 129 Lyman St., Woonsocket, RI (1905)
- Our Lady of Good Help R. C. Church, 1063 Victory Hwy., Mapleville, RI (1905)
- Our Lady of Lourdes R. C. School, 211 Carleton St., Providence, RI (1905)
- French Worsted Mills, 153 Hamlet Ave., Woonsocket, RI (1906) - Demolished 2012.
- Ervin Dunn House, 168 Woodland Rd., Woonsocket, RI (1907)
- St. Lawrence R. C. Church, 624 Woonasquatucket Ave., Centerdale, RI (1907)
- St. Matthew R. C. School, 909 Lonsdale Ave., Central Falls, RI (1907)
- First M. E. Church, 17 Federal St., Woonsocket, RI (1908)
- Notre Dame R. C. High School (Former), 62 Fales St., Central Falls, RI (1908)
- St. Casimir R. C. Church, 228 Child St., Warren, RI (1908–09) - Demolished.
- Elisha D. Clarke House, 144 Woodland Rd., Woonsocket, RI (1909)
- Holy Family R. C. Church, 414 S. Main St. Woonsocket, RI (1909)
- Pothier School, 1044 Social St., Woonsocket, RI (1909)

Private practice, 1910-1935:

- Y. M. C. A. Building, 43 Federal St., Woonsocket, RI (1910–11)
- Mt. St. Francis Orphanage, 4 St. Joseph St., Woonsocket, RI (1911)
- Edward T. Mee House, 253 Harris Ave., Woonsocket, RI (1912)
- Theron Metcalf School, 45 Winter St., Franklin, MA (1912–13)
- Thompson School, 10 Prospect St., Webster, MA (1912–13)
- Edmond H. Guerin House, 190 Glen Rd., Woonsocket, RI (1913) - The most expensive private home Fontaine designed.
- Woonsocket High School, 357 Park Pl., Woonsocket, RI (1913)
- Children's Building, Rhode Island State Sanatarium (Zambarano Hospital), Pascoag, RI (1914–15)
- St. Ann R. C. Church, 84 Cumberland St., Woonsocket, RI (1913–14)
- Ralph E. Carpenter House, 217 Woodland Rd., Woonsocket, RI (1915)
- Charles A. Proulx House, 183 Glen Rd., Woonsocket, RI (1915)
- American Paper Tube Co. Factory, 93 Hazel St., Woonsocket, RI (1916)
- McFee School, 108 High St., Woonsocket, RI (1916)
- Our Lady of Good Help R. C. School, 1063 Victory Hwy., Mapleville, RI (1916)
- St. Charles Borromeo R. C. Church, 176 Dexter St., Providence, RI (1916)
- Fifth Avenue School, 65 5th Ave., Woonsocket, RI (1917)
- Goldmark Knitting Co. Mill, 43 Railroad St., Woonsocket, RI (1917)
- St. Joseph R. C. Church, 191 Bucknam St., Everett, MA (1917) - Demolished.
- Blackstone High School, 86 Main St., Blackstone, MA (1919) - Demolished.
- Convent for Notre Dame R. C. Church, 626 Broad St., Central Falls, RI (1919)
- Laurier Theatre, 17 Cumberland St., Woonsocket, RI (1919) - Demolished.
- St. Louis de Gonzague R. C. Church (Remodeling), 48 W. Hollis St., Nashua, NH (1920–22) - Mostly demolished 1976.
- St. Anthony R. C. School, 190 Ashley Blvd., New Bedford, MA (1921)
- Mt. St. Charles Academy, Logee St., Woonsocket, RI (1922–24)
- St. Michael the Archangel Ukrainian Catholic Church, 394 Blackstone St., Woonsocket, RI (1922)
- Woonsocket Commercial School, 77 Federal St., Woonsocket, RI (1922)
- Sacred Heart R. C. School, Richards Ave., North Attleborough, MA (1923)
- St. Cecilia R. C. Church, 1253 Newport Ave., Pawtucket, RI (1923–24)
- Convent for St. Ann R. C. Church, 138 Elm St., Woonsocket, RI (1924)
- Walter F. Fontaine House, 211 Glen Rd., Woonsocket, RI (1925) - The architect's own home.
- Our Lady of Good Counsel R. C. School, 59 Pleasant St., Phenix, RI (1926)
- Union St.-Jean Baptiste d'Amerique Building, 1 Social St., Woonsocket, RI (1926)
- Woonsocket Jr. High School, 357 Park Pl., Woonsocket, RI (1926–27) - Actually a very large addition to the 1913 high school.
- Hospital, Rhode Island State Sanitarium, Pascoag, RI (1927–28)
- St. Joseph R. C. Church, 208 S. Main St., Attleboro, MA (1927–28)
- Bellingham Public Library, 10 Common St., Bellingham, MA (1929)
- St. Matthew R. C. Church, 1030 Dexter St., Central Falls, RI (1929)
- St. James R. C. Church, 33 Division St., Manville, RI (1930–32)
- Chris the King R. C. Church, 120 Legris Ave., Centerville, RI (1932–33) - Burned 1954.
- Convent for St. Matthew R. C. Church, 189 Wellington St., Fall River, MA (1932–33)
- St. Charles Borromeo R. C. School, 155 Harrison St., Providence, RI (1932–33)
- Convent for St. John R. C. Church, St. John St., Arctic, RI (1933–34) - Demolished.
- Sacred Heart R. C. Church, 321 S. Broadway, Lawrence, MA (1934–36)

Walter F. Fontaine & Sons, 1935-1938:

- Nurses' Home, Rhode Island State Sanitarium, Pascoag, RI (1935–36)
- Our Lady of Victories R. C. Church, 130 Prospect St., Woonsocket, RI (1935–36)
- Slatersville School, 83 Greene St., Slatersville, RI (1935–36)
- St. John R. C. Church, 20 Washington St., Arctic, RI (1936–40)
- St. Luke R. C. Church, 108 Washington Rd., Barrington, RI (1936) - Altered beyond recognition.
- St. Joseph R. C. Church, 1200 Mendon Rd., Woonsocket, RI (1938) - The last building Fontaine designed before his death.
