= Thompson School (Webster, Massachusetts) =

- U.S. National Register of Historic Places
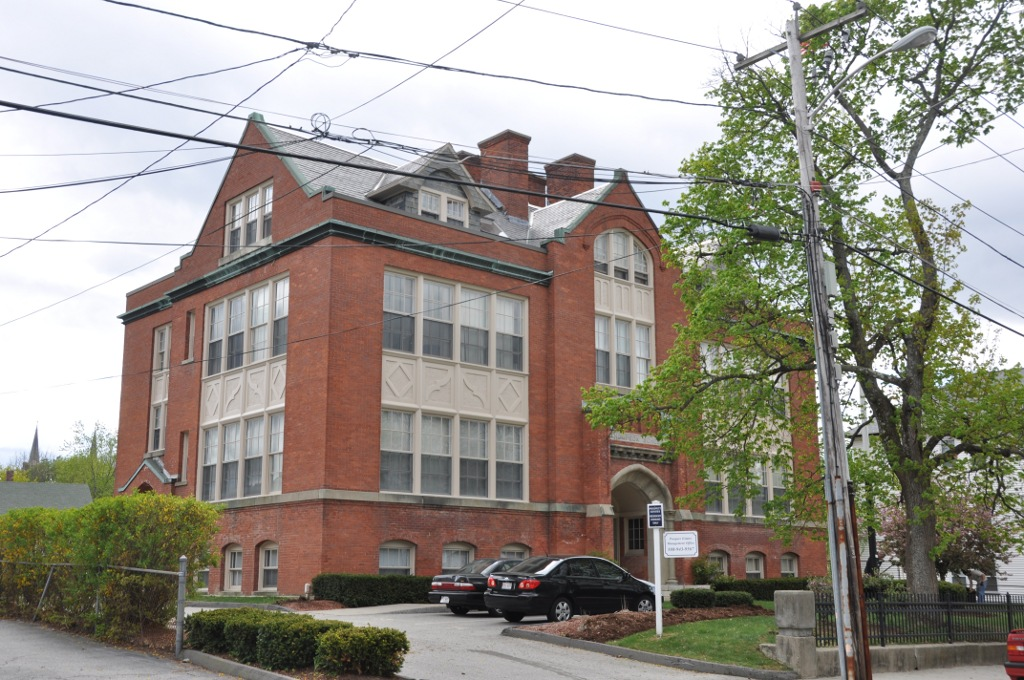

- Location within Massachusetts Location within the United States
- Location: Webster, Massachusetts
- Coordinates: 42°3′2″N 71°52′42″W
- Built: 1912
- Architect: Walter F. Fontaine
- Architectural style: Tudor Revival
- NRHP reference No.: 89000436
- Added to NRHP: June 7, 1989

The Thompson School is a historic school building on Prospect Street in Webster, Massachusetts. The 2 1/2-story English Revival brick building was constructed in 1912–13 to a design by Walter F. Fontaine, a leading architect from nearby Woonsocket, Rhode Island. It was named for Dr. John A. Thompson, who served on the local school committee from 1907 until his death in 1916.

The school building was listed on the National Register of Historic Places in 1989. It has been converted to residential use.

== See also ==
- National Register of Historic Places listings in Worcester County, Massachusetts
