= St. Ann's Church Complex (Woonsocket, Rhode Island) =

Historic church in Rhode Island, United States

- U.S. National Register of Historic Places
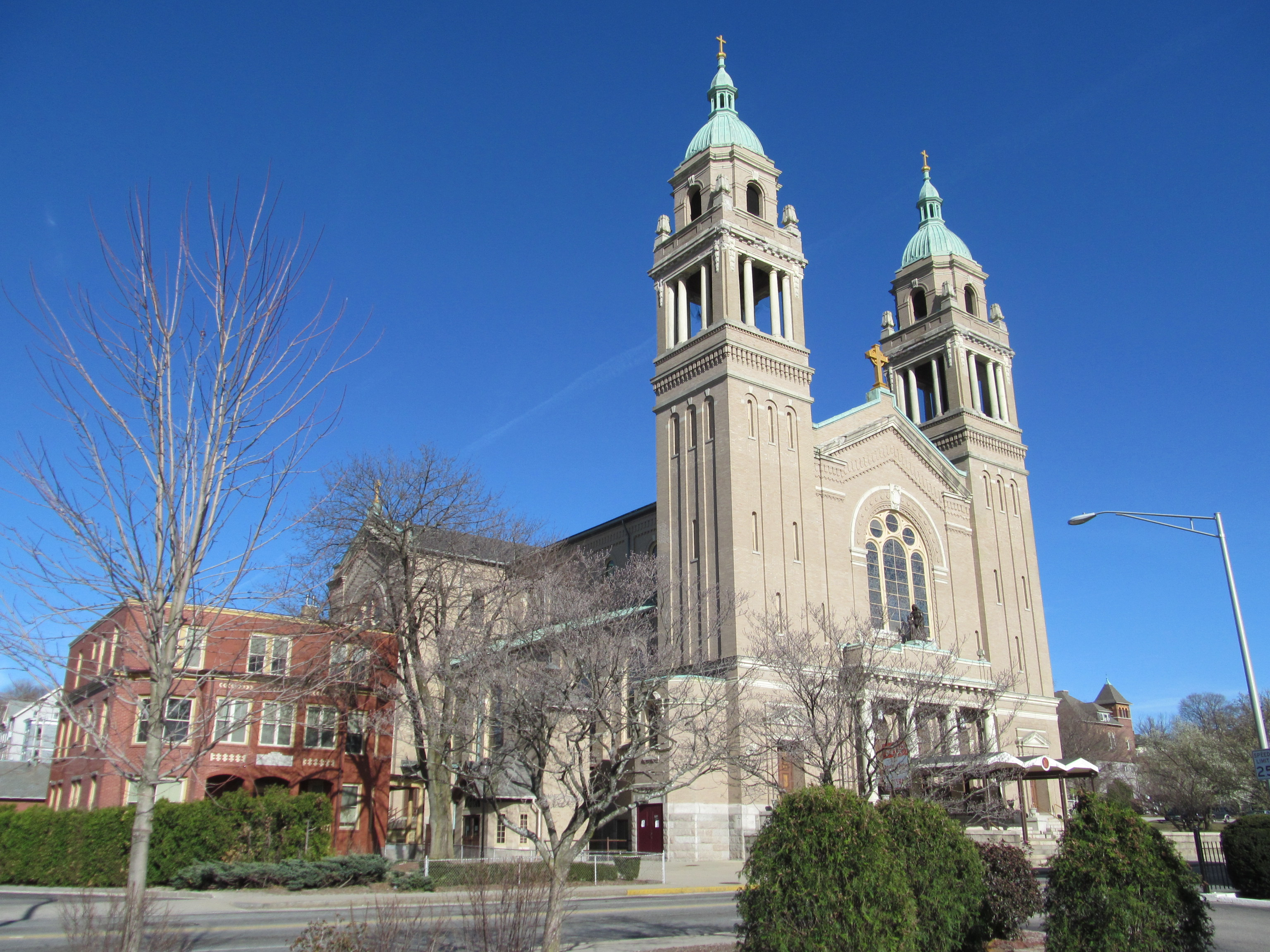
- St. Ann's Church

- Location within Rhode Island Location within the United States
- Location: Woonsocket, Rhode Island
- Coordinates: 42°0′27″N 71°30′8″W
- Built: 1913
- Architect: Walter F. Fontaine
- Architectural style: Renaissance
- MPS: Woonsocket MRA
- NRHP reference No.: 82000006
- Added to NRHP: November 24, 1982

St. Ann's Church Complex is now a historic cultural center in Woonsocket, Rhode Island on Cumberland Street. It was formerly a Roman Catholic church within the Diocese of Providence. It is notable for containing the largest collection of frescoes in North America.

== Description ==
The Renaissance style church was designed by Walter F. Fontaine to serve Woonsocket's French-Canadian community. Construction began in 1913 and the first mass was held in 1918. The complex originally encompassed a church, school, convent, parish house and a gymnasium that doubled as a theater. The total cost was $150,000.

In the 1920s, over 40 stained glass windows, designed and produced by French artists, were installed. In the 1940s, Guido Nincheri began work on painting frescoes on the ceilings and interior walls. Over the next eight years, Nincheri covered the interior with the frescoes, using Woonsocket residents as models. When he finished, St. Ann's contained the largest collection of frescoes in North America.

The church closed in October 2000 and later reopened as the St. Ann's Arts and Cultural Center. The St. Ann's complex was added to the National Register of Historic Places in 1982.

== See also ==
- Catholic Church in the United States
- Catholic parish church
- Index of Catholic Church articles
- National Register of Historic Places listings in Providence County, Rhode Island
- Pastoral care
