= Joseph M. Mosher =

American architect (1888–1967)

Joseph Marshall Mosher
- Born: 1888
- Died: 1967 (aged 78–79)
- Occupation: Architect

Joseph M. Mosher (1888–1967) was an American architect practicing in Rhode Island during the mid-20th century. He designed many churches and schools around southern New England, after being associated with the office of Walter F. Fontaine for many years.

== Life ==
Much of Joseph Marshall Mosher's life is unknown, with him first appearing circa 1921 as an architect in the office of Woonsocket architect Walter Fontaine, a major ecclesiastical architect. At that time he was noted as an alum and instructor in architecture at the Rhode Island School of Design. He remained with the Fontaine firm and its successors until about 1946, when he established his own office in Providence. During the early 1950s he took his son, Joseph Mosher Jr., into the firm, which became Joseph M. Mosher & Son. There may have been a second son involved as well. Mosher retired from the firm circa 1960. He died in 1967.

By 1961, Joseph Marshall Jr., a 1948 graduate of Brown University, had reestablished the firm as Joseph M. Mosher Associates. He served as the firm's head until his death in January 1991.

== Architectural works ==
=== Churches ===
The earliest known building that Mosher fully designed was in 1936, while a designer in the employ of Walter F. Fontaine & Sons. This was St. Luke's in Barrington, a chaste Gothic Revival church. Mosher's design eschewed commonplace materiality, substituting textured clapboarding for stone. In later years, the church was altered almost completely beyond recognition. Also for Fontaine's firm, Mosher had charge of the final phases of St. Cecilia's in Pawtucket, completed in 1946.

After breaking off from the Fontaine firm in 1946, Mosher embarked on a series of churches of his own. The earliest of these was St. Catherine of Siena, in Little Compton, a plain Colonial Revival building. It has been altered, but maintains its proportions. Also designed in 1946 but not completed for several more years was the Congregation Ahavath Sholom synagogue in Providence. Completed in 1949, it was Mosher's first International Style work, enhanced in 1962 by an addition by Ira Rakatansky.

Mosher's next project was for St. Anne's church in New Bedford, a much more academic Colonial Revival composition, complete with portico and pediment. Built in 1948, it has been vacant for several years and its fate is in question. Following in 1949 is St. Alexander, in Warren. Ambrose J. Murphy had begun the church in 1933, but only built the basement. Here, Mosher combined several Italian and Spanish precedents for his design, for a Mediterranean feel. The following year he built Sacred Heart, at East Providence, in the Byzantine Revival style. His last revivalist work was built in 1952, in the form of St. Lucy's in Middletown. It was a small, simple Gothic Revival church, similar in style to the older St. Luke's, though this time executed in standard brick and concrete.

With the addition of Joseph Mosher Jr., the office took a much more modernist turn. The first of these churches was Ascension, an episcopal parish in Cranston. Built in 1955, this church has a more conservative approach to modernism, discarding the traditional ornament but maintaining the traditional facade hierarchy. Next was Christ the King, at Centreville in West Warwick. The old church, burned in 1954, was built in 1932-33 and designed by Fontaine, possibly with Mosher's assistance. The design of this church ignores tradition almost completely, maintaining only a tall, steep roof. Built almost concurrently with Christ the King was St. Pius, in Westerly. This church was very similar to Ascension, but executed in stone.

=== Religious schools ===
Mosher designed a number of buildings for parochial schools throughout the region. In 1951 Mosher designed St. Augustine's School in Providence, a severe Jacobethan Revival building, though it exemplifies the asymmetry of mid-20th century design. In 1958 Mosher & Son designed the Immaculate Conception School in New Bedford. It is devoid of ornament, with the exception of a stylized panel above the main entrance on Davis Street. That same year they designed Raymond Hall, the second dormitory built on the Providence College campus. At the time, the new building was noted as containing the first air-conditioned college dining hall in New England. In 1959 they designed St. Philip School in Greenville, a single-story version of the New Bedford school.

Another Fontaine project Mosher had control over was the original St. Antoine Hospice in North Smithfield, a project of Woonsocket's Precious Blood Church. Design began in 1937, and construction in 1939. Mosher also supervised construction of this now-demolished, Art Deco project.

=== Secular work ===
In the 1950s and 60s Mosher & Son were hired to design two schools in Providence. First of these was the old Vocational Technical School of Rhode Island, of 1955. Now demolished, this was a spread-out International Style campus, in a dense neighborhood north of downtown. Second was the Harry Kizirian Elementary School on Camden Avenue, a long and low brick school. It may be noted for its entrance canopy, a simpler version of the one that may be seen on Veterans Memorial High School in Warwick.

A few years later, Mosher Associates designed the Smithfield High School, opened in 1966. This was designed as a group of intersecting planes, with a central courtyard.
