= Island Place Historic District =

Historic district in Rhode Island, United States

- U.S. National Register of Historic Places
- U.S. Historic district
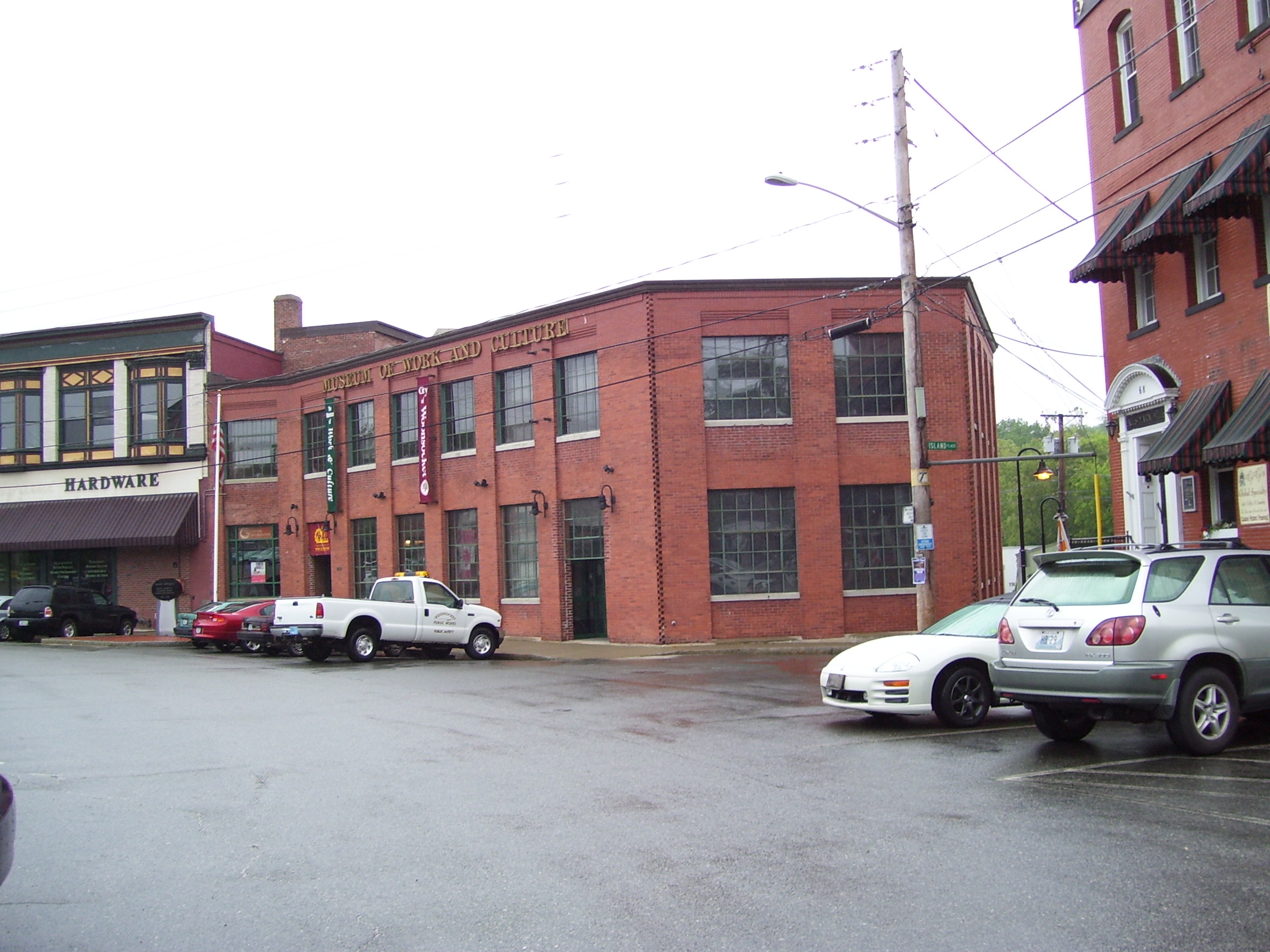
- Museum of Work and Culture

- Location within Rhode Island Location within the United States
- Location: Woonsocket, Rhode Island
- Coordinates: 41°59′57″N 71°30′59″W
- Built: 1857
- MPS: Woonsocket MPS
- NRHP reference No.: 90001348
- Added to NRHP: September 13, 1990

The Island Place Historic District is a historic district at Island Place and South Main Street at Market Square in Woonsocket, Rhode Island. The district includes six historic buildings, three of which are part of the Woonsocket Rubber Company Mill, dating from c. 1857 to c. 1919. The other buildings in the district are the Island Machine Company (c. 1874), the Barnai Worsted Company Dyeworks (c. 1919), and a wood-frame structure (c. 1870), that is the last surviving elements of the Wilkins Manufacturing Company. The district is bounded by Market Square, Bernon Street, and a bend in the Blackstone River. The site is now home to the Museum of Work and Culture, a project of the Rhode Island Historical Society.

The district was listed on the National Register of Historic Places in 1990; the Woonsocket Rubbert Company property was also listed separately in 1989.

== See also ==
- National Register of Historic Places listings in Providence County, Rhode Island
