= Woonsocket Rubber Company Mill =

- U.S. National Register of Historic Places
- U.S. Historic district – Contributing property
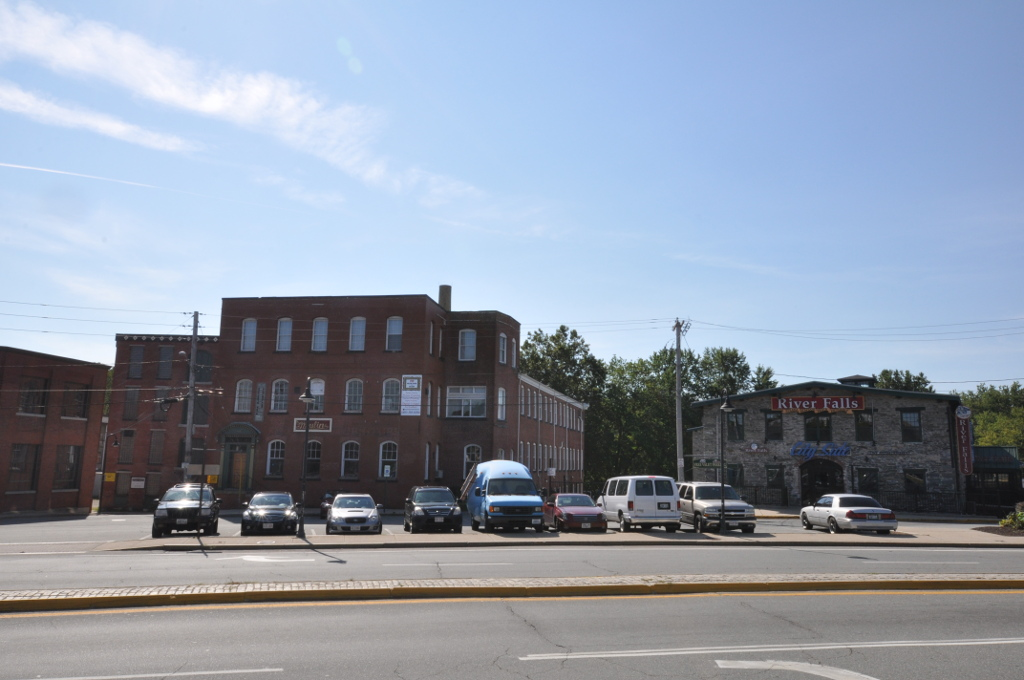

- Location within Rhode Island Location within the United States
- Location: Woonsocket, Rhode Island
- Coordinates: 42°0′0″N 71°31′2″W
- Built: 1857
- Part of: Island Place Historic District (ID90001348)
- NRHP reference No.: 89000334

Significant dates
- Added to NRHP: May 1, 1989
- Designated CP: September 13, 1990

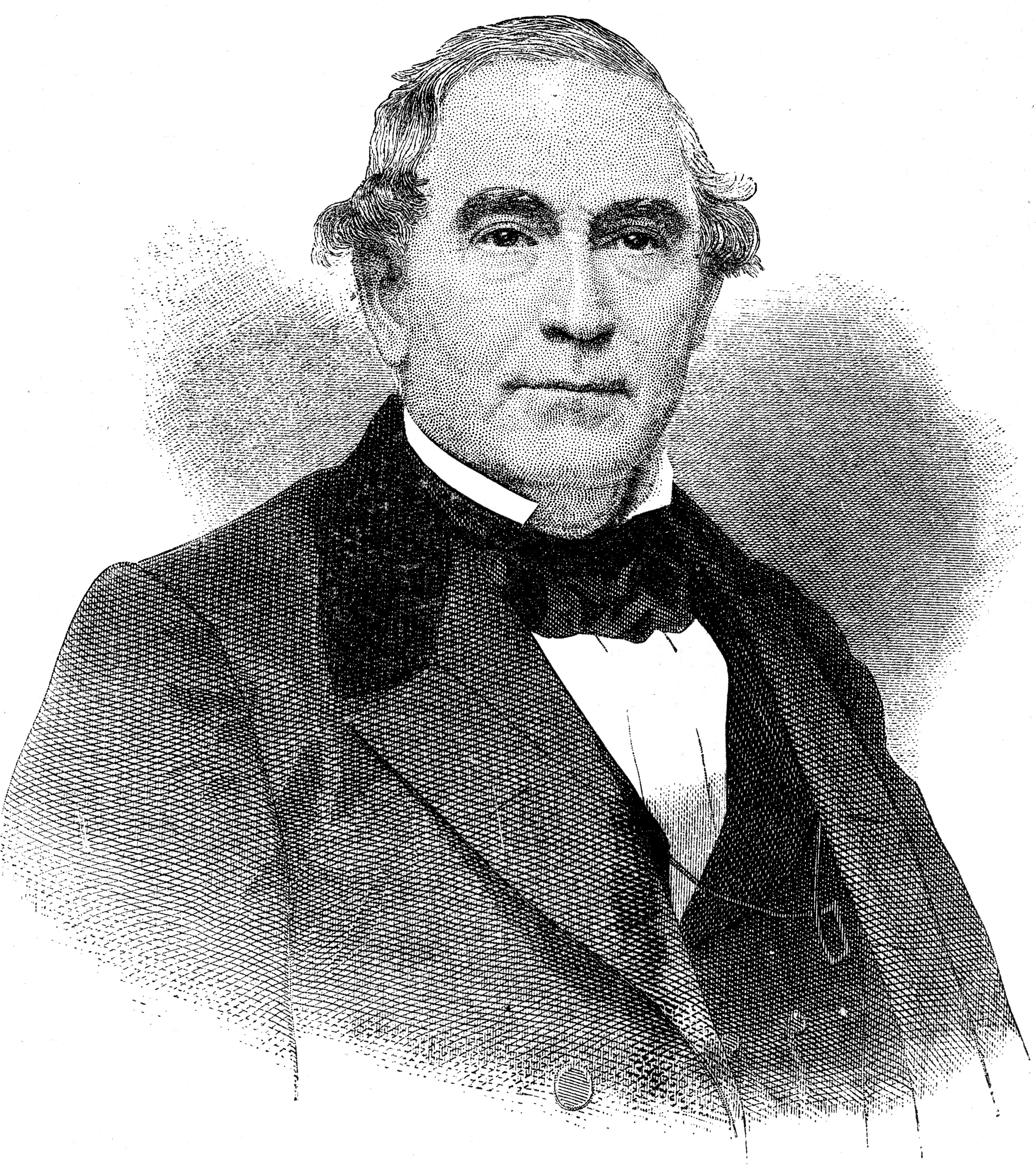
Edward Harris

Woonsocket Rubber Company Mill is an historic mill at 60-82 Main Street in Woonsocket, Rhode Island. The mill consists of a series of 3- and 4-story brick buildings built between 1865 and 1875 by Edward Harris, one of Woonsocket's leading businessmen. These buildings housed the Woonsocket Rubbert Company, one of Rhode Island's first manufacturer of rubber products, principally shoes, boots, and rubberized fabric. In 1910 the complex was purchased by the Falls Yarn Company, which used it for the production of fine woolen yarns.

The mill was listed on the National Register of Historic Places in 1989.

Another mill owned by Woonsocket Rubber Company, known as the Alice Mill, named for the owner's mother, was located on Fairmount Street in Woonsocket. It was destroyed in a June 7, 2011, fire.

== See also ==
- National Register of Historic Places listings in Providence County, Rhode Island
