= Index of Rhode Island–related articles =

The location of the state of Rhode Island in the United States of America

The following is an alphabetical list of articles related to the U.S. state of Rhode Island.

== 0–9 ==
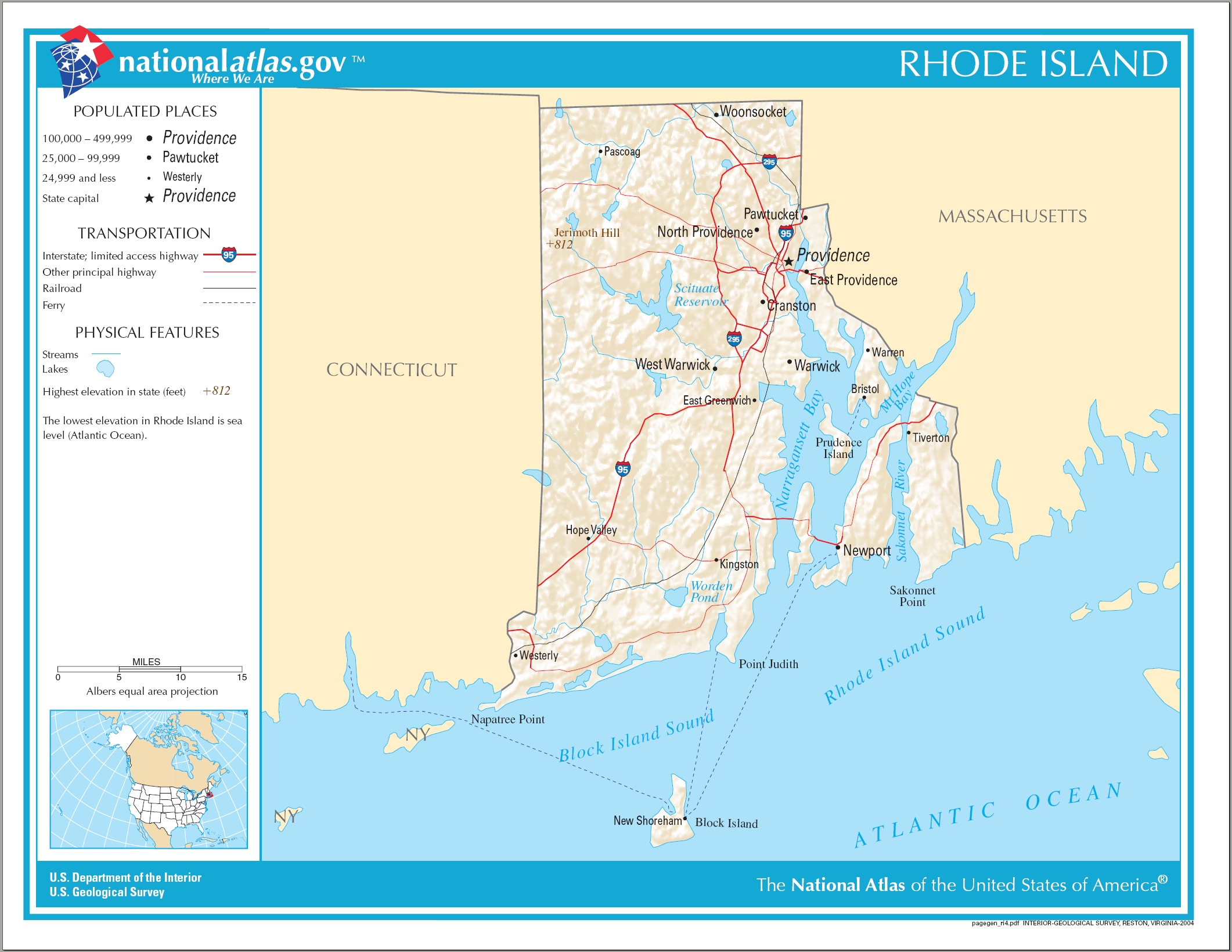
An enlargeable map of the state of Rhode Island

- .ri.us – Internet second-level domain for the state of Rhode Island
- 13th state to ratify the Constitution of the United States of America

== A ==
- Abortion in Rhode Island
- Adjacent states:
  - Commonwealth of Massachusetts
  - State of Connecticut
- Airports in Rhode Island
- Arboreta in Rhode Island
  - commons:Category:Arboreta in Rhode Island
- Archaeology in Rhode Island
  - Category:Archaeological sites in Rhode Island
    - commons:Category:Archaeological sites in Rhode Island
- Area codes in Rhode Island
- Arnold, Benedict
- Art museums and galleries in Rhode Island
  - commons:Category:Art museums and galleries in Rhode Island
- Astronomical observatories in Rhode Island
  - commons:Category:Astronomical observatories in Rhode Island

== B ==
- Beaches of Rhode Island
  - commons:Category:Beaches of Rhode Island
- Boston-Worcester-Manchester, MA-RI-NH Combined Statistical Area
- Botanical gardens in Rhode Island
  - commons:Category:Botanical gardens in Rhode Island
- Buildings and structures in Rhode Island
  - commons:Category:Buildings and structures in Rhode Island

== C ==
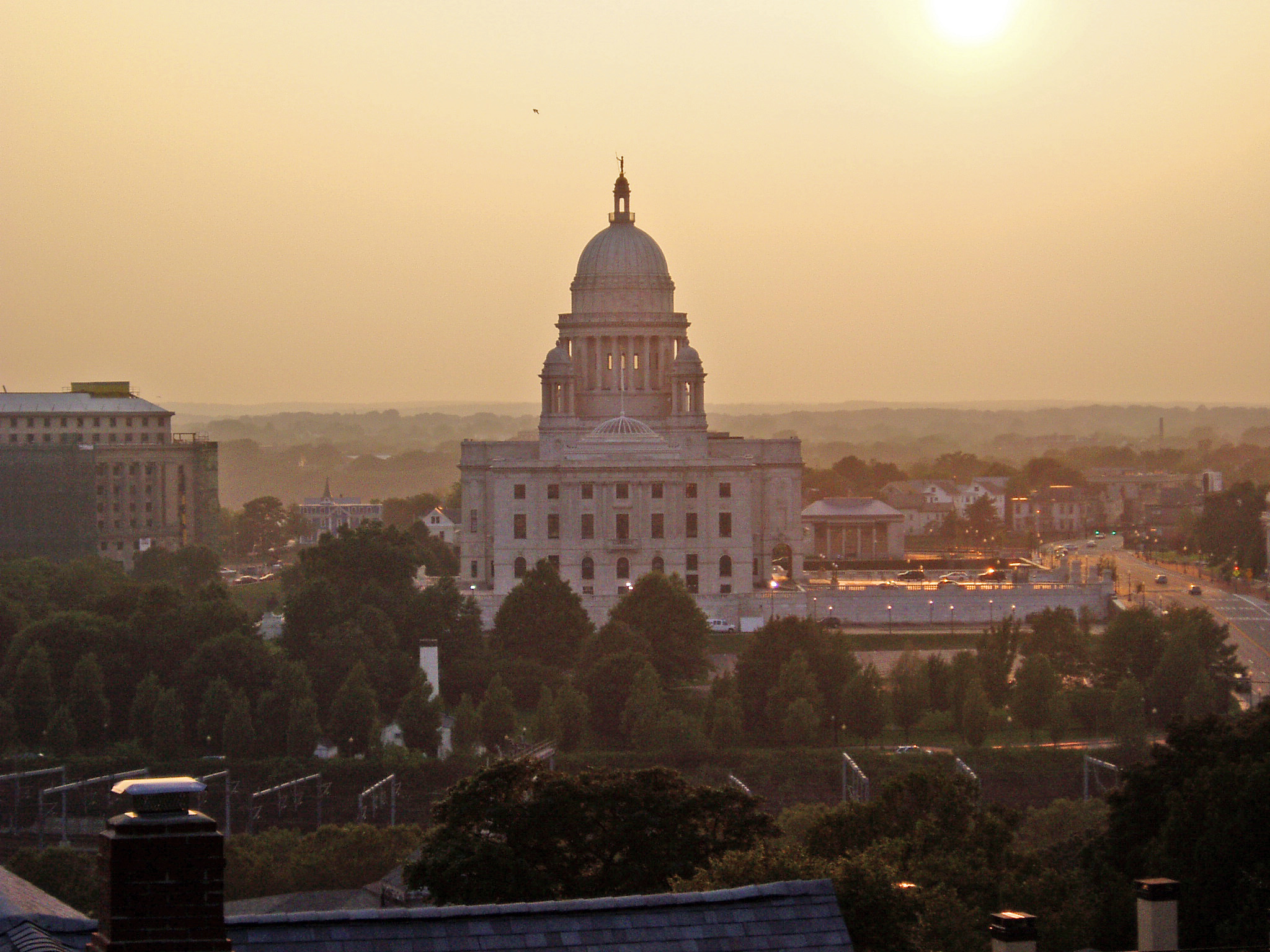
The Rhode Island State House in Providence

- Capital of the State of Rhode Island
- Capitol of the State of Rhode Island
  - commons:Category:Rhode Island State Capitol
- Census statistical areas of Rhode Island
- Cities in Rhode Island
  - commons:Category:Cities in Rhode Island

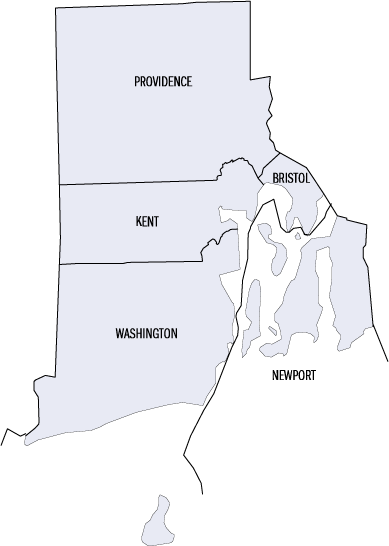
An enlargeable map of the 5 counties of the State of Rhode Island

- Climate of Rhode Island
- Colleges and universities in Rhode Island
  - commons:Category:Universities and colleges in Rhode Island
- Colony of Rhode Island and Providence Plantations
- Communications in Rhode Island
  - commons:Category:Communications in Rhode Island
- Congressional districts of Rhode Island
- Rhode Island Convention Center
  - commons:Category:Convention centers in Rhode Island
- Counties of the State of Rhode Island
  - commons:Category:Counties in Rhode Island
- Culture of Rhode Island
  - Category:Culture of Rhode Island
    - commons:Category:Rhode Island culture
- Crime in Rhode Island

== D ==
- Demographics of Rhode Island

== E ==
- Economy of Rhode Island
  - Category:Economy of Rhode Island
    - commons:Category:Economy of Rhode Island
- Education in Rhode Island
  - Category:Education in Rhode Island
    - commons:Category:Education in Rhode Island
- Category:Elections in Rhode Island
  - commons:Category:Elections in Rhode Island
- Category:Environment of Rhode Island
  - commons:Category:Environment of Rhode Island

== F ==
The Flag of the State of Rhode Island

- Festivals in Rhode Island
  - commons:Category:Festivals in Rhode Island
- Flag of the State of Rhode Island
- Fort Thunder
- Forts in Rhode Island
  - Category:Forts in Rhode Island
    - commons:Category:Forts in Rhode Island

== G ==
The Great Seal of the State of Rhode Island

- Gamm Theatre
- Gardens in Rhode Island
  - commons:Category:Gardens in Rhode Island
- Geography of Rhode Island
  - Category:Geography of Rhode Island
    - commons:Category:Geography of Rhode Island
- Geology of Rhode Island
  - commons:Category:Geology of Rhode Island
- Ghost towns in Rhode Island
  - Category:Ghost towns in Rhode Island
    - commons:Category:Ghost towns in Rhode Island
- Golf clubs and courses in Rhode Island
  - commons:Category:Ghost towns in Rhode Island
- Government of the State of Rhode Island website
  - Category:Government of Rhode Island
    - commons:Category:Government of Rhode Island
- Governor of the State of Rhode Island
  - List of governors of Rhode Island
- Great Seal of the State of Rhode Island

== H ==
- Rhode Island Heritage Hall of Fame
- Heritage railroads in Rhode Island
  - commons:Category:Heritage railroads in Rhode Island
- High schools of Rhode Island
- Higher education in Rhode Island
- Highway routes in Rhode Island
- Hiking trails in Rhode Island
  - commons:Category:Hiking trails in Rhode Island
- History of Rhode Island
  - Historical outline of Rhode Island
- Hospitals in Rhode Island
- House of Representatives of the State of Rhode Island

== I ==
- Images of Rhode Island
  - commons:Category:Rhode Island

== L ==
- Lakes of Rhode Island
  - commons:Category:Lakes of Rhode Island
- Landmarks in Rhode Island
  - commons:Category:Landmarks in Rhode Island
- Lieutenant Governor of the State of Rhode Island
- Lists related to the State of Rhode Island:
  - List of airports in Rhode Island
  - List of census statistical areas in Rhode Island
  - List of cities in Rhode Island
  - List of colleges and universities in Rhode Island
  - List of counties in Rhode Island
  - List of forts in Rhode Island
  - List of ghost towns in Rhode Island
  - List of governors of Rhode Island
  - List of high schools in Rhode Island
  - List of highway routes in Rhode Island
  - List of hospitals in Rhode Island
  - List of law enforcement agencies in Rhode Island
  - List of lieutenant governors of Rhode Island
  - List of museums in Rhode Island
  - List of National Historic Landmarks in Rhode Island
  - List of newspapers in Rhode Island
  - List of people from Rhode Island
  - List of radio stations in Rhode Island
  - List of railroads in Rhode Island
  - List of Registered Historic Places in Rhode Island
  - List of Rhode Island companies
  - List of rivers of Rhode Island
  - List of school districts in Rhode Island
  - List of state forests in Rhode Island
  - List of state parks in Rhode Island
  - List of state prisons in Rhode Island
  - List of symbols of the State of Rhode Island
  - List of telephone area codes in Rhode Island
  - List of television stations in Rhode Island
  - List of towns in Rhode Island
  - List of Rhode Island's congressional delegations
  - List of United States congressional districts in Rhode Island
  - List of United States representatives from Rhode Island
  - List of United States senators from Rhode Island

== M ==
- Maps of Rhode Island
  - commons:Category:Maps of Rhode Island
- Mass media in Rhode Island
- Museums in Rhode Island
  - Category:Museums in Rhode Island
    - commons:Category:Museums in Rhode Island
- Music of Rhode Island
  - commons:Category:Music of Rhode Island
  - Category:Musical groups from Rhode Island
  - Category:Musicians from Rhode Island

== N ==
- Natural history of Rhode Island
  - commons:Category:Natural history of Rhode Island
- New England
- Newport, Rhode Island, co-capital of the State of Rhode Island 1776-1900
- Newport Folk Festival
- Newport Jazz Festival
- Newspapers of Rhode Island

== P ==
- People from Rhode Island
  - Category:People from Rhode Island
    - commons:Category:People from Rhode Island
    - Category:People from Rhode Island by populated place
    - Category:People from Rhode Island by county
    - Category:People from Rhode Island by occupation
- Politics of Rhode Island
- Political party strength in Rhode Island
  - commons:Category:Politics of Rhode Island
- Portal:Rhode Island
- Portsmouth, capital of the Colony of Aquidneck Island 1639–1644, capital of the Colony of Rhode Island 1644-1663
- Protected areas of Rhode Island
  - commons:Category:Protected areas of Rhode Island
- Providence, capital of the Colony of Providence 1636–1663, capital of the Colony of Rhode Island and Providence Plantations 1663-1686 and 1689–1776, co-capital of the State of Rhode Island and Providence Plantations 1776–1900, and sole state capital since 1900.

== R ==
- Radio stations in Rhode Island
- Railroads in Rhode Island
- Registered historic places in Rhode Island
  - commons:Category:Registered Historic Places in Rhode Island
- Religion in Rhode Island
  - Category:Religion in Rhode Island
    - commons:Category:Religion in Rhode Island
- Rhode Island Department of Administration
- Rhode Island Philosophical Society
- RI – United States Postal Service postal code for the State of Rhode Island
- Rivers of Rhode Island
  - commons:Category:Rivers of Rhode Island
- Rhode Island website
  - Category:Rhode Island
    - commons:Category:Rhode Island
      - commons:Category:Maps of Rhode Island
- Rhode Island State House
- Rhode Island State Police

== S ==
- School districts of Rhode Island
- Scouting in Rhode Island
- Senate of the State of Rhode Island
- Settlements in Rhode Island
  - Cities in Rhode Island
  - Towns in Rhode Island
  - Villages in Rhode Island
  - Census Designated Places in Rhode Island
  - Other unincorporated communities in Rhode Island
  - List of ghost towns in Rhode Island
- Size of Rhode Island
- Ski areas and resorts in Rhode Island
  - commons:Category:Ski areas and resorts in Rhode Island
- Sports in Rhode Island
  - Category:Sports in Rhode Island
    - commons:Category:Sports in Rhode Island
  - Category:Sports venues in Rhode Island
    - commons:Category:Sports venues in Rhode Island
- State of Rhode Island website
  - Government of the State of Rhode Island
    - Category:Government of Rhode Island
      - commons:Category:Government of Rhode Island
  - Executive branch of the government of the State of Rhode Island
    - Governor of the State of Rhode Island
  - Legislative branch of the government of the State of Rhode Island
    - Legislature of the State of Rhode Island
      - Senate of the State of Rhode Island
      - House of Representatives of the State of Rhode Island
  - Judicial branch of the government of the State of Rhode Island
    - Supreme Court of the State of Rhode Island
- State parks of Rhode Island
  - commons:Category:State parks of Rhode Island
- State Police of Rhode Island
- State prisons of Rhode Island
- Structures in Rhode Island
  - commons:Category:Buildings and structures in Rhode Island
- Supreme Court of the State of Rhode Island
- Symbols of the State of Rhode Island
  - Category:Symbols of Rhode Island
    - commons:Category:Symbols of Rhode Island

== T ==
- Telecommunications in Rhode Island
  - commons:Category:Communications in Rhode Island
- Telephone area codes in Rhode Island
- Television shows set in Rhode Island
- Television stations in Rhode Island
- Theatres in Rhode Island
  - commons:Category:Theatres in Rhode Island
- Tourism in Rhode Island website
  - commons:Category:Tourism in Rhode Island
- Towns in Rhode Island
  - commons:Category:Cities in Rhode Island
- Transportation in Rhode Island
  - Category:Transportation in Rhode Island
    - commons:Category:Transport in Rhode Island
- Trinity Repertory Company

== U ==
- United States of America
  - States of the United States of America
  - United States census statistical areas of Rhode Island
  - Rhode Island's congressional delegations
  - United States congressional districts in Rhode Island
  - United States Court of Appeals for the First Circuit
  - United States District Court for the District of Rhode Island
  - United States representatives from Rhode Island
  - United States senators from Rhode Island
- Universities and colleges in Rhode Island
  - commons:Category:Universities and colleges in Rhode Island
- US-RI – ISO 3166-2:US region code for the State of Rhode Island

== W ==
- Waterfalls of Rhode Island
  - commons:Category:Waterfalls of Rhode Island
- WaterFire Providence
- Weybosset
  Wikimedia
  - Wikimedia Commons:Category:Rhode Island
    - commons:Category:Maps of Rhode Island
  - Wikinews:Category:Rhode Island
    - Wikinews:Portal:Rhode Island
  - Wikipedia Category:Rhode Island
    - Wikipedia Portal:Rhode Island
    - Wikipedia:WikiProject Rhode Island
      - Category:WikiProject Rhode Island articles
      - Category:WikiProject Rhode Island participants

== Z ==
- Zoos in Rhode Island
  - commons:Category:Zoos in Rhode Island

== See also ==
- Topic overview:
  - Rhode Island
  - Outline of Rhode Island
