= Outline of Rhode Island =

U.S. State

The flag of Rhode Island

The seal of Rhode Island

The location of the State of Rhode Island in the United States of America

The following outline is provided as an overview and topical guide to the U.S. state of Rhode Island:

== General reference ==
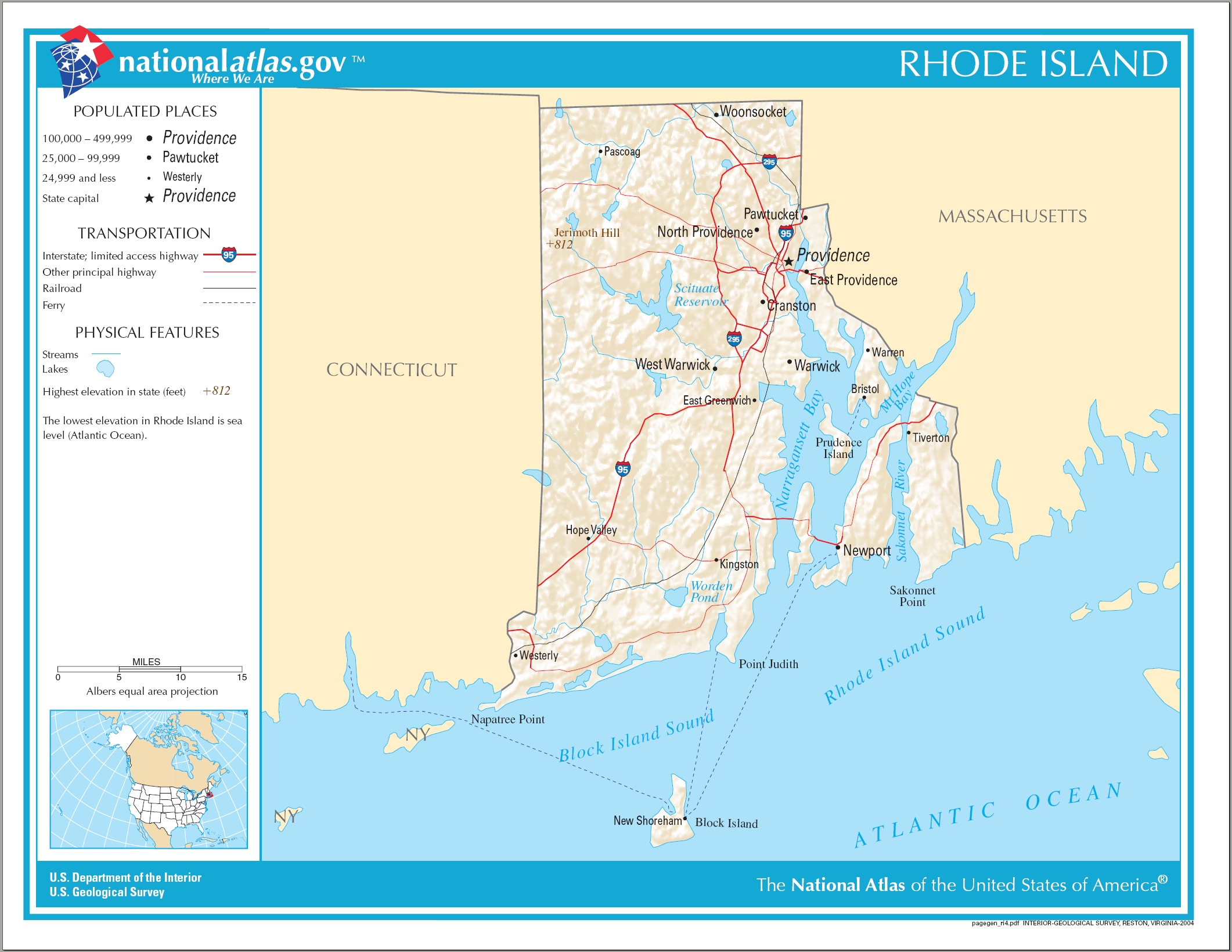
An enlargeable map of the State of Rhode Island and Providence Plantations

- Names
  - Common name: Rhode Island
    - Pronunciation: /roʊd ˈaɪlɪnd/
  - Official name: State of Rhode Island
  - Abbreviations and name codes
    - Postal symbol: RI
    - ISO 3166-2 code: US-RI
    - Internet second-level domain: .ri.us
  - Nicknames
    - Little Rhody
    - Ocean State (currently used on license plates)
- Adjectival: Rhode Island
- Demonym: Rhode Islander

== Geography of Rhode Island ==
Geography of Rhode Island

- Rhode Island is: a U.S. state, a federal state of the United States of America
- Location
  - Northern Hemisphere
  - Western Hemisphere
    - Americas
      - North America
        - Anglo America
        - Northern America
          - United States of America
            - Contiguous United States
              - Eastern United States
                - East Coast of the United States
                  - Northeastern United States
                    - New England
                  - Northeast megalopolis
- Population of Rhode Island: 1,052,567 (2010 U.S. Census)
- Area of Rhode Island: 1,545 sq mi (4,001 km^{2})
- Atlas of Rhode Island

=== Places in Rhode Island ===
- Historic places in Rhode Island
  - National Historic Landmarks in Rhode Island
  - National Register of Historic Places listings in Rhode Island
    - Bridges on the National Register of Historic Places in Rhode Island
- National Natural Landmarks in Rhode Island
- State parks in Rhode Island

=== Environment of Rhode Island ===
- Climate of Rhode Island
- Protected areas in Rhode Island
  - State forests of Rhode Island
- Superfund sites in Rhode Island

==== Natural geographic features of Rhode Island ====
- Lakes of Rhode Island
- Rivers of Rhode Island

=== Demography of Rhode Island ===
Demographics of Rhode Island

== Government and politics of Rhode Island ==
Politics of Rhode Island

- Form of government: U.S. state government
- Rhode Island's congressional delegations
- Rhode Island State Capitol
- Political party strength in Rhode Island

=== Branches of the government of Rhode Island ===
Government of Rhode Island

==== Executive branch of the government of Rhode Island ====
- Governor of Rhode Island
  - Lieutenant Governor of Rhode Island
  - Secretary of State of Rhode Island
- State departments
  - Rhode Island Department of Transportation

==== Legislative branch of the government of Rhode Island ====
- Rhode Island General Assembly (bicameral)
  - Upper house: Rhode Island Senate
  - Lower house: Rhode Island House of Representatives

==== Judicial branch of the government of Rhode Island ====
Courts of Rhode Island

- Supreme Court of Rhode Island

=== Law and order in Rhode Island ===
Law of Rhode Island

- Cannabis in Rhode Island
- Capital punishment in Rhode Island
- Constitution of Rhode Island
- Crime in Rhode Island
- Gun laws in Rhode Island
- Law enforcement in Rhode Island
  - Law enforcement agencies in Rhode Island
    - Rhode Island State Police
  - Prisons in Rhode Island
- Same-sex marriage in Rhode Island

=== Military in Rhode Island ===
- Rhode Island Air National Guard
- Rhode Island Army National Guard

=== Local government in Rhode Island ===
Local government in Rhode Island

== History of Rhode Island ==
History of Rhode Island

=== History of Rhode Island, by period ===
- Indigenous peoples
- English Colony of Providence, 1636–1644
- English Colonies of Rhode Island, 1638–1644
  - Portsmouth Compact, 1638
- English Colony of Providence Plantations, 1644–1663
  - History of slavery in Rhode Island
- English Colony of Rhode Island and Providence Plantations, 1663–1686
  - King Philip's War, 1675–1676
- English Dominion of New-England in America, 1686–1689
- English Colony of Rhode Island and Providence Plantations, 1689–1707
- British Colony of Rhode Island and Providence Plantations, 1707–1776
  - King George's War, 1740–1748
    - Treaty of Aix-la-Chapelle of 1748
  - French and Indian War, 1754–1763
    - Treaty of Paris of 1763
- American Revolutionary War, April 19, 1775 – September 3, 1783
  - Treaty of Paris, September 3, 1783
- State of Rhode Island and Providence Plantations since 1776
  - Rhode Island declares its independence from the United Kingdom, May 4, 1776
  - United States Declaration of Independence, July 4, 1776
    - Fourth state to ratify the Articles of Confederation and Perpetual Union, signed July 9, 1778
  - Thirteenth state to ratify the Constitution of the United States of America on May 29, 1790
  - War of 1812, June 18, 1812 – March 23, 1815
    - Treaty of Ghent, December 24, 1814
  - Dorr Rebellion, 1841–1842
  - Mexican–American War, April 25, 1846 – February 2, 1848
  - American Civil War, April 12, 1861 – May 13, 1865
    - Rhode Island in the American Civil War

=== History of Rhode Island, by region ===
==== By municipality ====
- History of Burrillville
- History of Newport
- History of Providence

=== History of Rhode Island, by subject ===
- List of Rhode Island state legislatures

== Culture of Rhode Island ==
Culture of Rhode Island

- Cuisine of Rhode Island
- Museums in Rhode Island
- Religion in Rhode Island
  - Episcopal Diocese of Rhode Island
- Scouting in Rhode Island
- State symbols of Rhode Island
  - Flag of the state of Rhode Island and Providence Plantations
  - Seal of the state of Rhode Island and Providence Plantations

=== The arts in Rhode Island ===
- Music of Rhode Island

=== Sports in Rhode Island ===
Sports in Rhode Island

== Economy and infrastructure of Rhode Island ==
Economy of Rhode Island

- Communications in Rhode Island
  - Newspapers in Rhode Island
  - Radio stations in Rhode Island
  - Television stations in Rhode Island
- Health care in Rhode Island
  - Hospitals in Rhode Island
- Transportation in Rhode Island
  - Airports in Rhode Island

== Education in Rhode Island ==
Education in Rhode Island

- Schools in Rhode Island
  - School districts in Rhode Island
    - High schools in Rhode Island
  - Colleges and universities in Rhode Island
    - University of Rhode Island
    - Brown University

== See also ==
- Index of Rhode Island-related articles
