= National Register of Historic Places listings in West Greenwich, Rhode Island =

List of Registered Historic Places in West Greenwich, Rhode Island, which has been transferred from and is an integral part of National Register of Historic Places listings in Kent County, Rhode Island

Contents: Counties in Rhode Island

Bristol | Kent | Newport | Providence | Washington

This National Park Service list is complete through NPS recent listings posted April 3, 2026.

	Name on the Register	Image	Date listed	Location	City or town	Description
1	Stephen Allen House	Stephen Allen House	September 20, 1978 (#78000060)	Sharp St. 41°38′40″N 71°41′30″W	West Greenwich	
2	Hopkins Hollow Village	Hopkins Hollow Village	January 27, 2010 (#09001290)	Hopkins Hollow Rd., Narrow Ln., and Perry Hill Rd. 41°40′59″N 71°45′06″W	Coventry and West Greenwich	
3	West Greenwich Baptist Church and Cemetery	West Greenwich Baptist Church and Cemetery	November 28, 1978 (#78000066)	Plain Meeting House and Liberty Hill Rds. 41°38′16″N 71°45′10″W	West Greenwich Center	

== Former listings ==
	Name on the Register	Image	Date listed	Date removed	Location	City or town	Description
1	Hopkins Mill		January 11, 1974 (#74002295)	Unknown	RI 3	West Greenwich	Demolished in 1978 for the Big River Reservoir project.

== See also ==
- National Register of Historic Places listings in Kent County, Rhode Island
- List of National Historic Landmarks in Rhode Island
