= Arcadia Management Area =

Park area in the USA

Coordinates: 41°33′0″N 71°42′0″W

The Arcadia Management Area is a protected area in Richmond, Exeter, Hopkinton, and West Greenwich, Rhode Island. With an area of 14,000 acres, it is the state's largest recreational area. AMA is home to an extensive network of logging roads and single track trails - ideal for picnicking, hiking, running, mountain biking, fishing, horseback riding, and boating. During the winter some of the roads going through the forest close and are only accessible by foot traffic. In 2011, part of the film Moonrise Kingdom was filmed at the park. The former Pine Top Ski Area on Escoheag Hill is located within Arcadia.

== Gallery ==
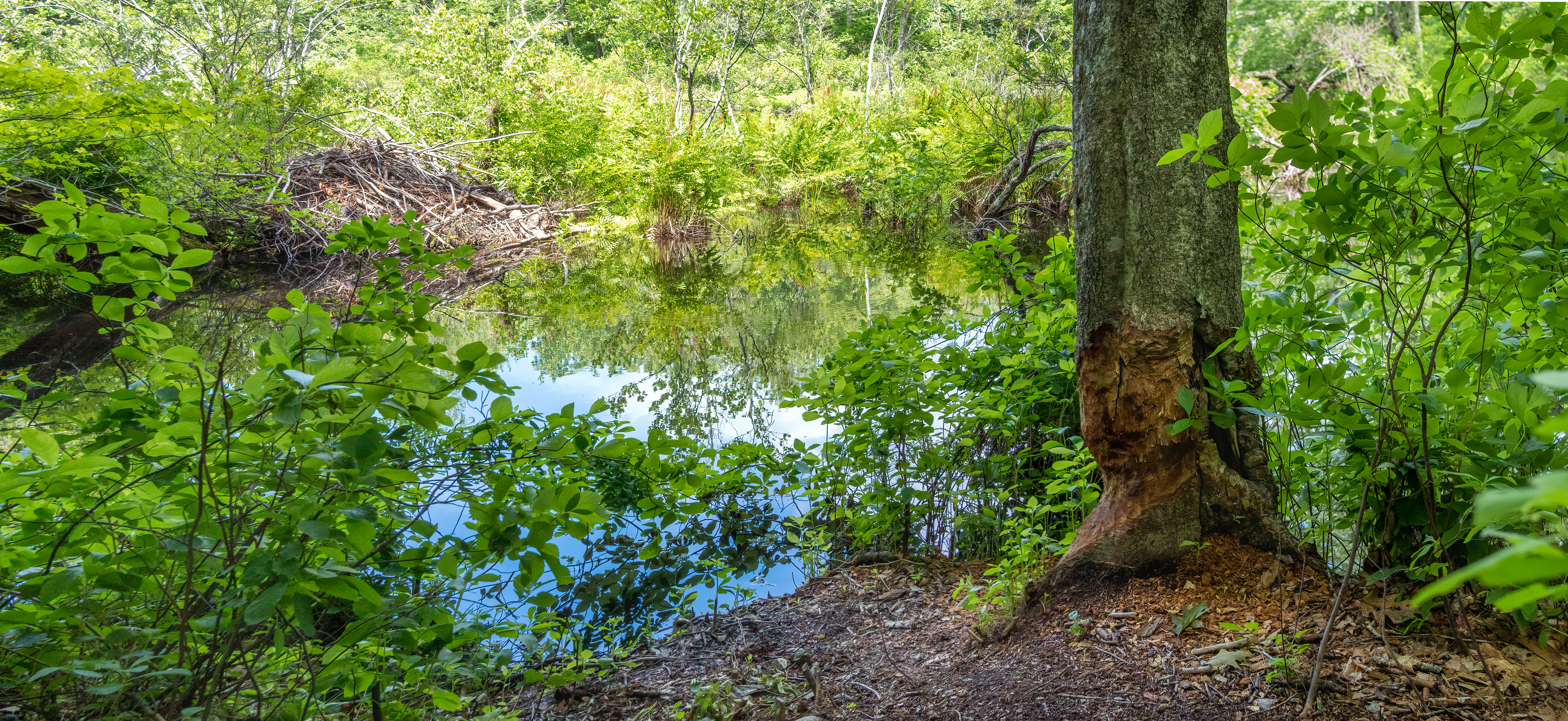
A beaver lodge and beaver-chewed tree along the Ben Utter trail in Arcadia

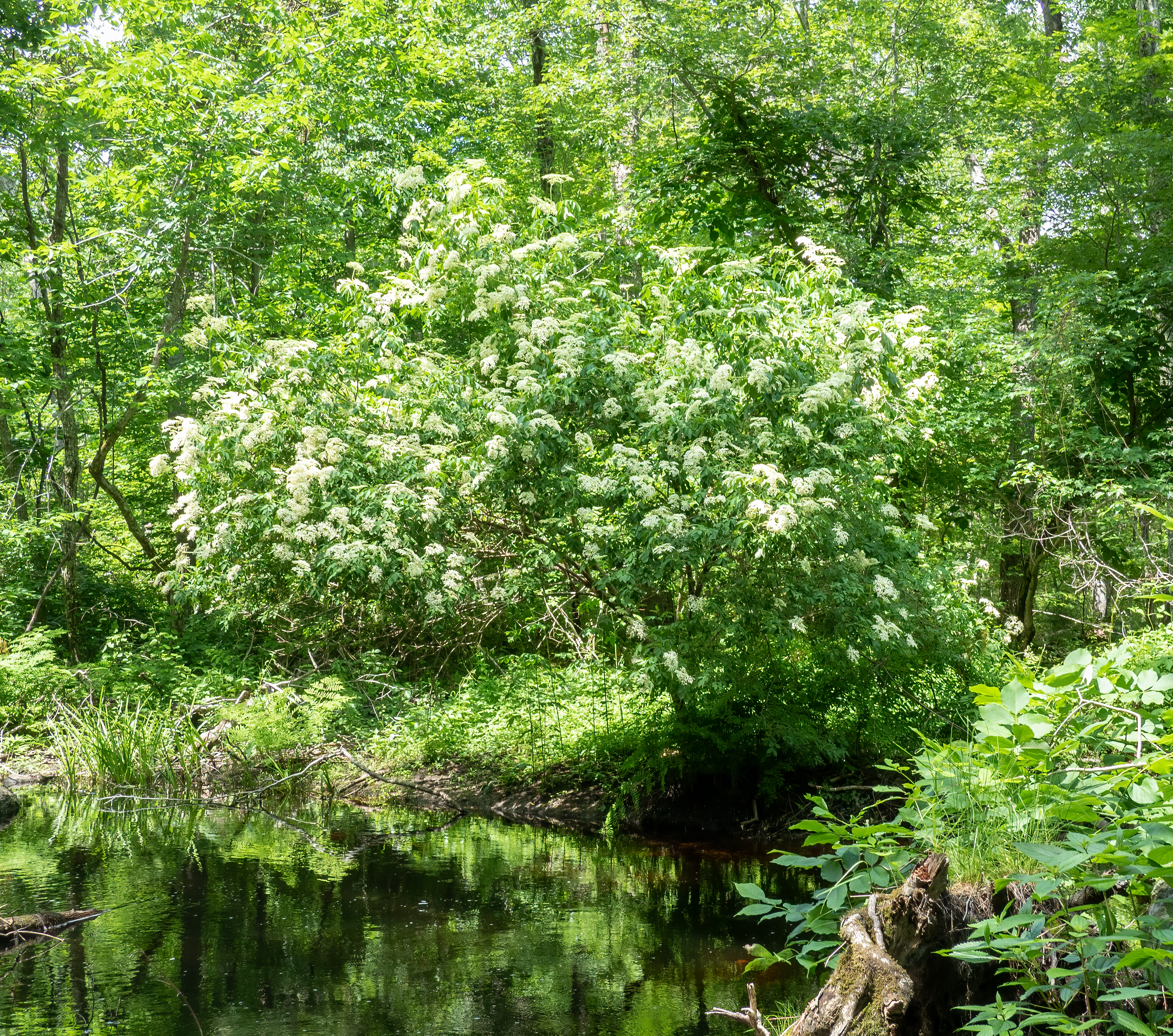
A large elderberry bush along the Wood River
