= List of Rhode Island state forests =

== Rhode Island state forests ==
Name (by alphabetical order)	Location (of main entrance)
Lincoln Woods State Forest	Providence County
George Washington Memorial State Forest	Providence County
Wickaboxet State Forest	Kent County

== See also ==
- List of national forests of the United States
