= George Washington State Campground =

Camping facility in Rhode Island, US

Coordinates: 41.9201°N 71.7548°W

George Washington State Campground is an overnight camping facility in Chepachet, a village in the town of Glocester, Rhode Island, United States. The campground is managed by the Rhode Island Department of Parks and Recreation, and is located on Putnam Pike (Route 44).

The site contains the George Washington Memorial State Forest covering 3,500 acres (1,400 ha) of protected forest land, and a 100-acre primitive camping area without electrical hookups. The area contains Bowdish Reservoir and two smaller ponds.
