= Escoheag Hill =

Hill in West Greenwich, Rhode Island, United States

Coordinates: 41.6075°N 71.7735°W

Escoheag Hill (ES-ko-hog, sometimes ES-ko-heag) is a 560 foot hill off Escoheag Hill Road in West Greenwich, Rhode Island. The hill was the site of the former Pine Top Ski Area.

The ski area opened in the 1965-66 season and had two T-Bar lifts, night skiing, and snowmaking. For a short period in the 1970s, there was also a summertime motorcycle park. The ski area closed around 1980, and the ski lodge burned in the mid-1980s. The area is now part of the Arcadia Management Area.
