= Rhode Island statistical areas =

Coordinates: 41.6762°N 71.5562°W

The U.S. State of Rhode Island currently has two statistical areas that have been delineated by the Office of Management and Budget (OMB). On July 21, 2023, the OMB delineated the Providence-Warwick, RI-MA Metropolitan Statistical Area and the Boston-Worcester-Providence, MA-RI-NH Combined Statistical Area, which are inclusive of all five of Rhode Island's counties.

== Statistical areas ==
The Office of Management and Budget (OMB) has designated more than 1,000 statistical areas for the United States and Puerto Rico. These statistical areas are important geographic delineations of population clusters used by the OMB, the United States Census Bureau, planning organizations, and federal, state, and local government entities.

The OMB defines a core-based statistical area (CBSA) as the county or counties (or county-equivalents) surrounding at least one densely-settled core of at least 10,000 population, "plus adjacent counties having a high degree of social and economic integration with the core as measured through commuting ties with the counties containing the core". The OMB further divides a CBSA based on population into a metropolitan statistical area (MSA) for those with at least 50,000 people or a micropolitan statistical area (μSA) for those with 10,000 to 49,999 people.

The OMB defines a combined statistical area (CSA) as two or more adjacent CBSAs where the employment interchange rate (percent commuting from A to B plus percent commuting from B to A) is at least 15%. A primary statistical area (PSA) includes all CSAs and any CBSA that is not a constituent of a combined statistical area.

The two United States statistical areas and five counties of the State of Rhode Island (Note: An out-of-state area and its population are displayed in green. An area that extends into more than one state is displayed in purple. A purple population number over a black population number show the total population versus the in-state population. The state's abbreviation is also shown next to the in-state total.)
Combined statistical area	2025 population (est.)	Core-based statistical area	2025 population (est.)	County	2025 population (est.)	Metropolitan division	2025 population (est.)
Boston-Worcester-Providence, MA-RI-NH CSA	8,521,063; 1,114,521 (RI)	Boston-Cambridge-Newton, MA-NH MSA	5,034,221	Middlesex County, Massachusetts	1,669,979	Cambridge-Newton-Framingham, MA MD	2,496,632
Boston-Worcester-Providence, MA-RI-NH CSA	8,521,063; 1,114,521 (RI)	Boston-Cambridge-Newton, MA-NH MSA	5,034,221	Essex County, Massachusetts	826,653	Cambridge-Newton-Framingham, MA MD	2,496,632
Boston-Worcester-Providence, MA-RI-NH CSA	8,521,063; 1,114,521 (RI)	Boston-Cambridge-Newton, MA-NH MSA	5,034,221	Suffolk County, Massachusetts	791,891	Boston, MA MD	2,078,469
Boston-Worcester-Providence, MA-RI-NH CSA	8,521,063; 1,114,521 (RI)	Boston-Cambridge-Newton, MA-NH MSA	5,034,221	Norfolk County, Massachusetts	739,749	Boston, MA MD	2,078,469
Boston-Worcester-Providence, MA-RI-NH CSA	8,521,063; 1,114,521 (RI)	Boston-Cambridge-Newton, MA-NH MSA	5,034,221	Plymouth County, Massachusetts	546,829	Boston, MA MD	2,078,469
Boston-Worcester-Providence, MA-RI-NH CSA	8,521,063; 1,114,521 (RI)	Boston-Cambridge-Newton, MA-NH MSA	5,034,221	Rockingham County, New Hampshire	324,077	Rockingham County-Strafford County, NH MD	459,120
Boston-Worcester-Providence, MA-RI-NH CSA	8,521,063; 1,114,521 (RI)	Boston-Cambridge-Newton, MA-NH MSA	5,034,221	Strafford County, New Hampshire	135,043	Rockingham County-Strafford County, NH MD	459,120
Boston-Worcester-Providence, MA-RI-NH CSA	8,521,063; 1,114,521 (RI)	Providence-Warwick, RI-MA MSA	1,708,161; 1,114,521 (RI)	Providence County, Rhode Island	678,179	none	
Boston-Worcester-Providence, MA-RI-NH CSA	8,521,063; 1,114,521 (RI)	Providence-Warwick, RI-MA MSA	1,708,161; 1,114,521 (RI)	Bristol County, Massachusetts	593,640	none	
Boston-Worcester-Providence, MA-RI-NH CSA	8,521,063; 1,114,521 (RI)	Providence-Warwick, RI-MA MSA	1,708,161; 1,114,521 (RI)	Kent County, Rhode Island	173,495	none	
Boston-Worcester-Providence, MA-RI-NH CSA	8,521,063; 1,114,521 (RI)	Providence-Warwick, RI-MA MSA	1,708,161; 1,114,521 (RI)	Washington County, Rhode Island	129,795	none	
Boston-Worcester-Providence, MA-RI-NH CSA	8,521,063; 1,114,521 (RI)	Providence-Warwick, RI-MA MSA	1,708,161; 1,114,521 (RI)	Newport County, Rhode Island	83,051	none	
Boston-Worcester-Providence, MA-RI-NH CSA	8,521,063; 1,114,521 (RI)	Providence-Warwick, RI-MA MSA	1,708,161; 1,114,521 (RI)	Bristol County, Rhode Island	50,001	none	
Boston-Worcester-Providence, MA-RI-NH CSA	8,521,063; 1,114,521 (RI)	Worcester, MA MSA	888,502	Worcester County, Massachusetts	888,502	none	
Boston-Worcester-Providence, MA-RI-NH CSA	8,521,063; 1,114,521 (RI)	Manchester-Nashua, NH MSA	433,415	Hillsborough County, New Hampshire	433,415	none	
Boston-Worcester-Providence, MA-RI-NH CSA	8,521,063; 1,114,521 (RI)	Barnstable Town, MA MSA	233,539	Barnstable County, Massachusetts	233,539	none	
Boston-Worcester-Providence, MA-RI-NH CSA	8,521,063; 1,114,521 (RI)	Concord, NH μSA	158,078	Merrimack County, New Hampshire	158,078	none	
Boston-Worcester-Providence, MA-RI-NH CSA	8,521,063; 1,114,521 (RI)	Laconia, NH μSA	65,147	Belknap County, New Hampshire	65,147	none	
State of Rhode Island					1,114,521	none	

The one core-based statistical area of the State of Rhode Island (Note: For CBSAs comprising populations from multiple states, they are listed twice to show both their intrastate population within that CBSA as well as the CBSA's total population. Only the intrastate population is ranked.)
2025 rank	Core-based statistical area	Population				
2025 rank	Core-based statistical area	2025 estimate	Change	2020 Census	Change	2010 Census
1	Providence-Warwick, RI-MA MSA (RI)	1,114,521	+1.56%	1,097,379	+4.26%	1,052,567
	Providence-Warwick, RI-MA MSA	1,708,161	+1.88%	1,676,579	+4.73%	1,600,852

The one combined statistical area of the State of Rhode Island (Note: For CSAs comprising populations from multiple states, they are listed twice to show both their intrastate population within that CSA as well as the CSA's total population. Only the intrastate population is ranked.)
2025 rank	Combined statistical area	Population				
2025 rank	Combined statistical area	2025 estimate	Change	2020 Census	Change	2010 Census
1	Boston-Worcester-Providence, MA-RI-NH CSA (RI)	1,114,521	+1.56%	1,097,379	+4.26%	1,052,567
	Boston-Worcester-Providence, MA-RI-NH CSA	8,521,063	+2.05%	8,349,768	+7.39%	7,774,948

== See also ==
- Geography of Rhode Island
  - Demographics of Rhode Island
