= West Greenwich Baptist Church and Cemetery =

Historic cemetery in Kent County, Rhode Island, US

- U.S. National Register of Historic Places
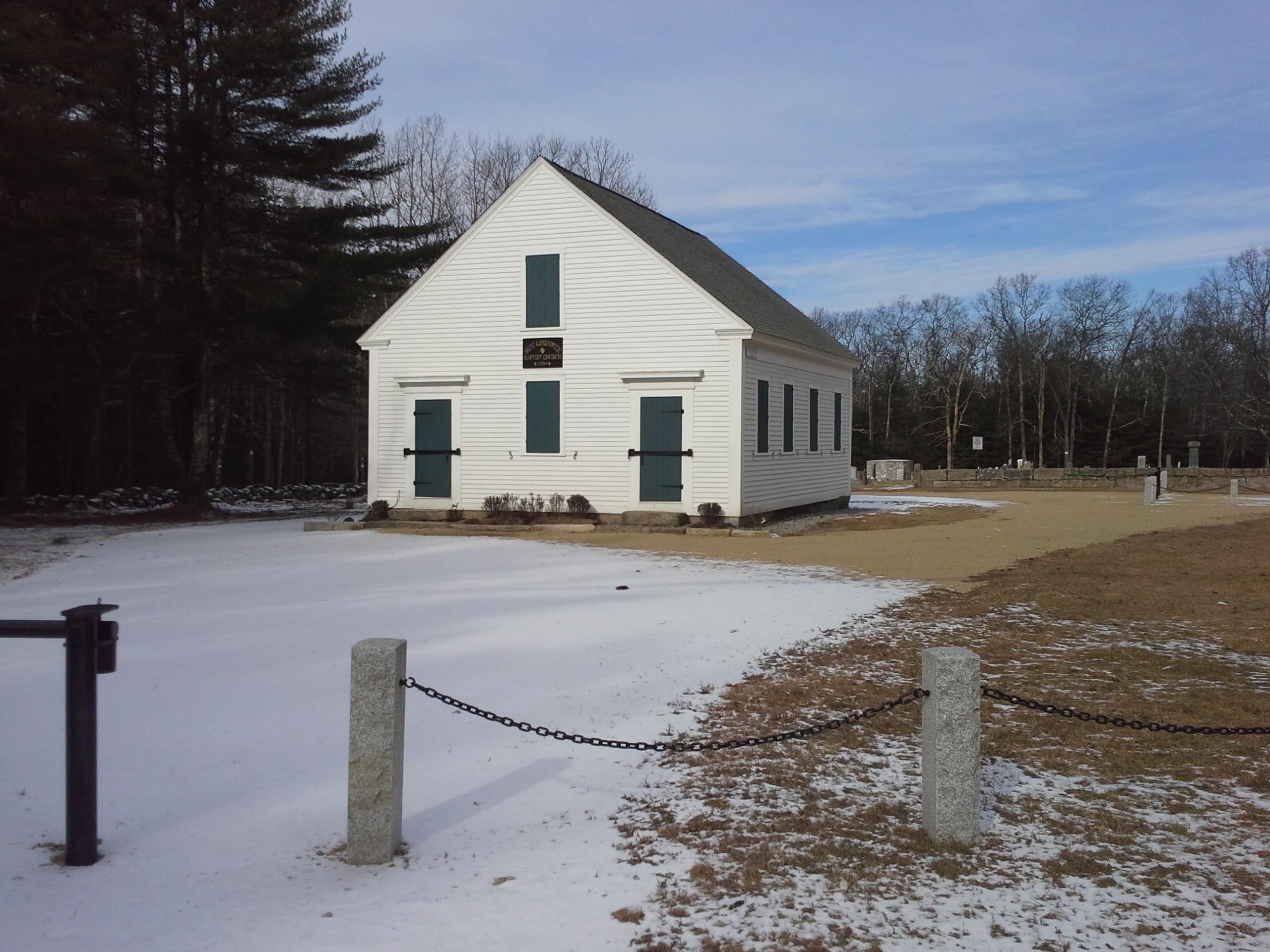

- Location within Rhode Island Location within the United States
- Location: West Greenwich Center, Rhode Island
- Coordinates: 41°38′16″N 71°45′09″W
- Built: 1822
- Architectural style: Federal
- NRHP reference No.: 78000066
- Added to NRHP: November 28, 1978

West Greenwich Baptist Church and Cemetery (also known as the Plain Meeting House) is a historic church meeting house and cemetery at Plain Meeting House and Liberty Hill Roads in West Greenwich Center, Rhode Island. It is the oldest building of this type in the western edge of Rhode Island.

The Federal era "Plain Meeting" House was built around 1822 by the Independent and Union Society as a meeting house for the use of all local Christian congregations. The meeting house was named "Plain" after its location on the "plain" of West Greenwich Center. The building was used primarily by two Baptist congregations, the West Greenwich Baptist Church (founded in 1750) which believed in a Calvinist theology, and a branch of the Six Principle Baptist Church, which espoused an Arminian theology. The Six Principle branch had been planted by the Maple Root Six Principle Baptist Church located a few miles to the north. The two congregations merged in 1868 and continued to be known as the West Greenwich Baptist Church, maintaining sole custody of the building. Regular Sunday services were held well into the twentieth century and a Sunday School to study the Bible was held in the building as well. The building was added to the National Register of Historic Places in 1978.

== See also ==
- National Register of Historic Places listings in Kent County, Rhode Island
