= George Washington Memorial State Forest =

State forest in Rhode Island, United States

Coordinates: 41.919°N 71.766°W

George Washington Memorial State Forest is a state forest on the Putnam Pike (Route 44) near the village of Chepachet in the town of Glocester, Rhode Island.

The forest was founded in 1932 as Rhode Island's first state forest. It is part of the George Washington Management Area containing over 4,000 acres of protected forest land and a 100–acre primitive camping area, known as the George Washington State Campground.
