= Wickaboxet Management Area =

Coordinates: 41.645°N 71.727°W

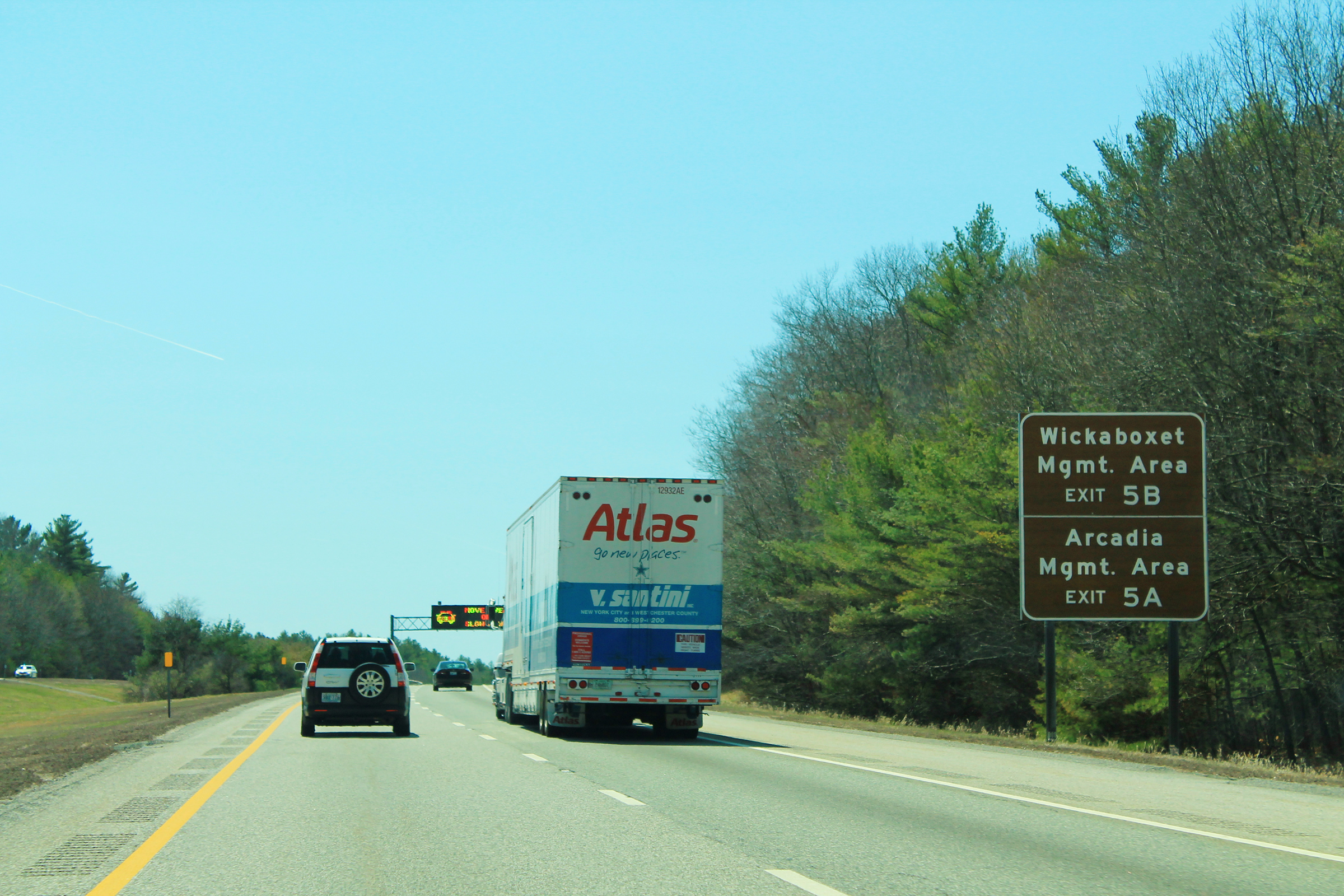
Wickaboxet State Forest exit

Wickaboxet State Forest is a 678 acre state management area on Plain Meeting House Road in West Greenwich, Rhode Island. It was founded in 1932.
