= List of Rhode Island state symbols =

Location of the state of Rhode Island in the United States of America

The following is a list of symbols of the U.S. state of Rhode Island.

== Insignia ==
Type	Symbol	Image	Adopted
Flag	Flag of Rhode Island		1640 (originally); 1916 (formally)
Flag	Flag of Rhode Island (fringed)		1640 (originally); 1916 (formally)
Motto	Hope	Hope	1664
Nickname	The Ocean State; Little Rhody; The Plantation State	The Ocean State; Little Rhody; The Plantation State	1971
Seal	Seal of Rhode Island		1644
Slogan	Unwind	Unwind	2000
Coat of Arms	Coat of Arms of Rhode Island		1822

== Living symbols ==
Type	Symbol	Image	Adopted
Bird	Rhode Island Red Chicken; Gallus gallus domesticus		1954
Coral	Northern Star Coral; Astrangia poculata		2021
Fish	Striped Bass; Morone saxatilis		2000
Flower	Violet; Viola sororia		1968
Insect	American Burying Beetle; Nicrophorus americanus		2015
Tree	Red Maple; Acer rubrum		1964
Shell	Quahaug; Mercenaria mercenaria		1987

== Earth symbols ==
Type	Symbol	Image	Adopted
Fruit	Rhode Island Greening Apple		1991
Mineral	Bowenite		1966
Rock	Cumberlandite		1966

== Cultural symbols ==
Type	Symbol	Image	Adopted
Drink	Coffee Milk		1993
Song	"Rhode Island, It's for Me"		1996
Tartan	Rhode Island State Tartan		2000
Yacht	Courageous		2000
Ship	USS Providence, SSV Oliver Hazard Perry		1993
Folk Art	Crescent Park Looff Carousel		1985
Appetizer	Calamari		2014

== United States coin ==
Type	Symbol	Image	Coined
Quarter dollar	Rhode Island Quarter 2001		2001
