= Rhode Island Philosophical Society =

The Rhode Island Philosophical Society (RIPS) meets annually in the state of Rhode Island, United States of America. Founded in the 1950s and revived in the 1970s, RIPS is a non-profit organization directed by philosophers, and welcomes anyone with a serious interest in philosophy. RIPS has featured keynote speakers such as B. F. Skinner, Roderick Chisholm, Jaegwon Kim, Paul A. Swift, Yuriko Saito, Don Zeyl, Nomy Arpaly, Galen Johnson, and Mary Louise Gill. The annual meeting of RIPS is free and open to the public. In recent years, RIPS has convened at the following locations:

- 2009 Community College of Rhode Island
- 2010 Bryant University
- 2011 Brown University
- 2012 University of Rhode Island
- 2013 Rhode Island College
- 2014 Providence College
