= Weybosset =

Weybosset is a Narragansett term for a river crossing where three trails met, and the name of a street in Providence, Rhode Island.

== History ==
Weybosset in the Narragansett language meant, crossing place, at a narrow place that Indians used to walk from one side of the bay to the other, presumably during low to mid-tides. Weybosset is just south of the convergence of two rivers, Woonasquatucket and Moshassuck, flowing south into the Providence River, at the upper end of Narragansett Bay.

Weybosset was also where three important native Indian trails met, one coming down from the north, the second up from the southeast Mount Hope region called the Wampanoag Trail, and the third up from Connecticut in the southwest called the Pequot Trail.

Later the Weybosset name was given to a wooden colonial toll bridge built by the early settlers across the Providence River at the entrance to the Cove. Roger Williams (1603–1683), founder of Providence and the Rhode Island Colony, served for a time as the toll taker at Weybosset in his elderly years. Gradually the Cove was filled in and built upon in what is now called Downtown Providence. The old wood bridge was replaced several times with steel and concrete bridges. Once referred to at the world's widest bridge, the Weybosset Street Bridge is part of the Waterplace Park and Riverwalk, built in 1994, where popular WaterFire celebrations are held during some summer evenings.

Weybosset Street currently begins at the north end of Broad Street at the intersection of Empire Street, and continues northeast joining Westminster Street to cross the river at the foot of College Street, in Providence, Rhode Island.

The Arcade Providence is located on Weybosett Street.
