= List of ghost towns in Rhode Island =

This is an incomplete list of ghost towns in Rhode Island.

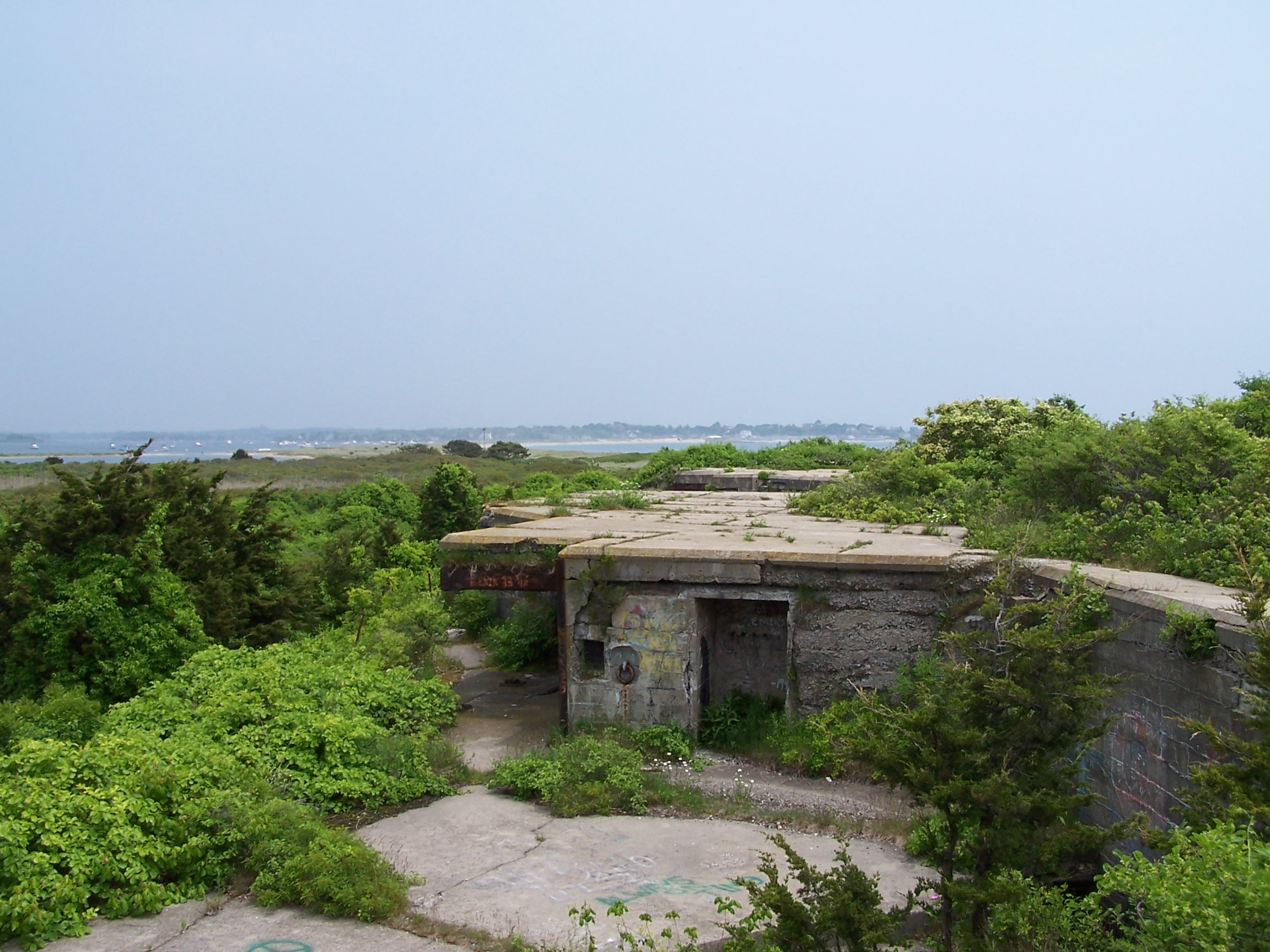
The remains of Fort Mansfield at Napatree Point

- Ashland, under the Scituate Reservoir
- Elmdale, near the northern part of the Scituate Reservoir
- Hanton City
- Kent, under the Scituate Reservoir near the reservoir's dam
- Napatree Point
- Ponaganset, near the Barden Reservoir
- Ramtail
- Richmond, under the Scituate Reservoir(not to be confused with the nearby active town)
- Rockland, near the Plainfield Pike
- South Scituate, under the Scituate Reservoir
- Sowams, in Bristol County
- Wallum Lake, near Wallum Lake
- Wayland, in Providence County
