= Abortion in Rhode Island =

Abortion in Rhode Island is legal up to the point of fetal viability. On June 19, 2019, the legal right to abortion was codified into Rhode Island law by passage of the Reproductive Privacy Act.

== History ==
=== Legislative history ===
By the end of the 1800s, all states in the Union, except Louisiana, had therapeutic exceptions in their legislative bans on abortions. In the 19th century, bans by state legislatures on abortion were about protecting the life of the mother, given the number of deaths caused by abortions; state governments saw themselves as looking out for the lives of their citizens.

The state was one of ten states in 2007 to have a customary informed consent provision for abortions. In 2013, state Targeted Regulation of Abortion Providers (TRAP) law applied to medication induced abortions and private doctor offices, in addition to abortion clinics.

As of May 14, 2019, the state prohibited abortions after the fetus was viable, considered to be 24 weeks. This period uses a standard defined by the US Supreme Court in 1973 with the Roe v. Wade ruling. Another provision was on the books banning abortion at 12 weeks but it was not enforceable by law. In May 2019, Rhode Island's Senate Judiciary Committee considered a bill that would have allowed the right to an abortion to be codified into state law, before finally rejecting it.

On June 19, 2019, both the Rhode Island Senate and the Rhode Island House of Representatives passed the Reproductive Privacy Act. The House voted 45–29, and the Senate voted 21–17. Governor Raimondo signed the legislation soon after. The Reproductive Privacy Act banned Rhode Island from restricting “an individual person from preventing, commencing, continuing, or terminating that individual’s pregnancy prior to fetal viability” or after fetal viability “to preserve the health or life” of the pregnant individual. It also forbade state restrictions on contraceptives, repealed bans on partial-birth abortions, forbade medical professionals from being charged with felony assault for performing abortions, and repealed requirements for abortion providers to notify a husband before giving his wife an abortion.

On August 27, 2019, a motion was filed in Superior Court which alleges that the Reproductive Privacy Act violated Article I, Section 2, of the Constitution of Rhode Island. These allegations are premised on plaintiffs' argument that Article I, Section 2, prohibits the General Assembly from passing any law that would grant or secure any rights relating to abortion or the funding thereof. The motion was dismissed in 2022.

=== Judicial history ===
Before the US Supreme Court decision Roe v. Wade decriminalized abortion nationwide in 1973, abortion was already legal in several states, but the decision imposed a uniform framework for state legislation on the subject. It established a minimal period during which abortion is legal (with more or fewer restrictions throughout the pregnancy). That basic framework, modified in Planned Parenthood v. Casey (1992), remains nominally in place, although the effective availability of abortion varies significantly from state to state, as many counties have no abortion providers. Planned Parenthood v. Casey held that a law cannot place legal restrictions imposing an undue burden for "the purpose or effect of placing a substantial obstacle in the path of a woman seeking an abortion of a non-viable fetus".

=== Clinic history ===
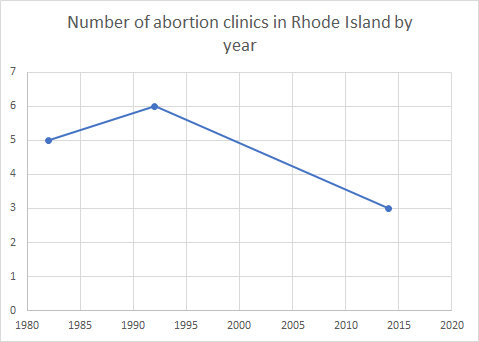
Number of abortion clinics in Rhode Island by year

Between 1982 and 1992, the number of abortion clinics in the state increased from five in 1982 to six in 1992. In 2014, there were three abortion clinics in the state. In 2014, 80% of the counties in the state did not have an abortion clinic. That year, 36% of women in the state aged 15–44 lived in a county without an abortion clinic. In 2017, there was one Planned Parenthood clinic, which offered abortion services, in a state with a population of 246,389 women aged 15–49.

== Statistics ==
In the period between 1972 and 1974, there were no recorded illegal abortion deaths in the state. In 1990, 137,000 women in the state faced the risk of an unintended pregnancy. In 2010, the state had no publicly funded abortions. In 2014, 63% of adults said in a poll by the Pew Research Center that abortion should be legal in all or most cases. The 2023 American Values Atlas reported that, in their most recent survey, 71% of Rhode Islanders said that abortion should be legal in all or most cases. In 2017, the state had an infant mortality rate of 6.2 deaths per 1,000 live births.

Number of reported abortions, abortion rate, and percentage change in rate by geographic region and state in 1992, 1995, and 1996
Census division and state	Number			Rate			% change 1992–1996
Census division and state	1992	1995	1996	1992	1995	1996	% change 1992–1996
Total	1,528,930	1,363,690	1,365,730	25.9	22.9	22.9	–12
New England	78,360	71,940	71,280	25.2	23.6	23.5	–7
Connecticut	19,720	16,680	16,230	26.2	23	22.5	–14
Maine	4,200	2,690	2,700	14.7	9.6	9.7	–34
Massachusetts	40,660	41,190	41,160	28.4	29.2	29.3	3
New Hampshire	3,890	3,240	3,470	14.6	12	12.7	–13
Rhode Island	6,990	5,720	5,420	30	25.5	24.4	–19

Number of reported abortions and abortion rate, selected years; and percentage change in rate, 2008–2011 — all by region and state in which the abortions occurred
Region and state	Number			Rate (abortions per 1,000 women aged 15–44.)			% change 2008–2011
Region and state	2008	2010	2011	2008	2010	2011	% change 2008–2011
Total	1,212,350	1,102,670	1,058,490	19.4	17.7	16.9	−13
Northeast	302,710	281,250	272,020	27.1	25.3	24.6	−9
Connecticut	17,030	15,430	14,640	24.4	22.3	21.3	−13
Maine	2,800	2,490	2,360	11.2	10.3	9.9	−12
Massachusetts	24,900	24,360	24,030	18.4	18.0	17.8	−3
New Hampshire	3,200	3,040	3,200	12.4	12.2	12.9	4
New Jersey	54,160	48,840	46,990	30.9	28.1	27.1	−12
New York	153,110	142,790	138,370	37.7	35.3	34.2	−9
Pennsylvania	41,000	38,650	36,870	16.7	15.8	15.1	−9
Rhode Island	5,000	4,290	4,210	22.9	20.0	19.8	−13
Vermont	1,510	1,370	1,370	12.5	11.6	11.7	−7

Number of reported abortions and abortion rate in 2014, 2016, and 2017; and percentage change in rates between 2014 and 2017, all by region and state in which the abortion occurred
Region and state	Number			Rate (abortions per 1,000 women aged 15–44.)			% change 2014–2017
Region and state	2014	2016	2017	2014	2016	2017	% change 2014–2017
U.S. Total	926,190	874,080	862,320	14.6	13.7	13.5	–8
Northeast	240,320	232,040	224,310	21.8	21.2	20.5	–6
Connecticut	13,140	12,210	11,910	19.2	18.1	17.7	–8
Maine	2,220	2,060	2,040	9.5	8.9	8.8	–7
Massachusetts	21,020	19,200	18,590	15.3	14.0	13.5	–12
New Hampshire	2,540	2,310	2,210	10.4	9.6	9.2	–12
New Jersey	44,460	48,300	48,110	25.8	28.2	28.0	9
New York	119,940	110,840	105,380	29.6	27.6	26.3	–11
Pennsylvania	32,030	32,230	31,260	13.3	13.5	13.1	–1
Rhode Island	3,580	3,510	3,500	17.0	16.8	16.7	–2
Vermont	1,400	1,360	1,300	12.1	12.0	11.4	–5

Number, rate, and ratio of reported abortions, by reporting area of residence and occurrence and by percentage of abortions obtained by out-of-state residents, US CDC estimates
Location	Residence			Occurrence			% obtained by out-of-state residents	Year	Ref
Location	No.	Rate^	Ratio^^	No.	Rate^	Ratio^^	% obtained by out-of-state residents	Year	Ref
Rhode Island	2,581	12.3	238	2,990	14.2	276	16	2014	
Rhode Island	2,348	11.2	214	2,649	12.6	241	14.7	2015	
Rhode Island	2,223	10.7	206	2,479	11.9	230	12.9	2016	
^number of abortions per 1,000 women aged 15–44; ^^number of abortions per 1,000 live births

== Abortion rights views and activities ==
=== Protests ===
Women from the state participated in marches supporting abortion rights as part of a #StoptheBans movement in May 2019.

Following the overturn of Roe v. Wade on June 24, 2022, an abortion rights protest was held outside the Rhode Island State Capitol on June 24. The Providence Police Department stated they were investigating an officer running for Rhode Island State Senate after he allegedly assaulted a political opponent during the protest while off-duty.
