= Stephen Allen House =

Historic house in Rhode Island, United States

- U.S. National Register of Historic Places
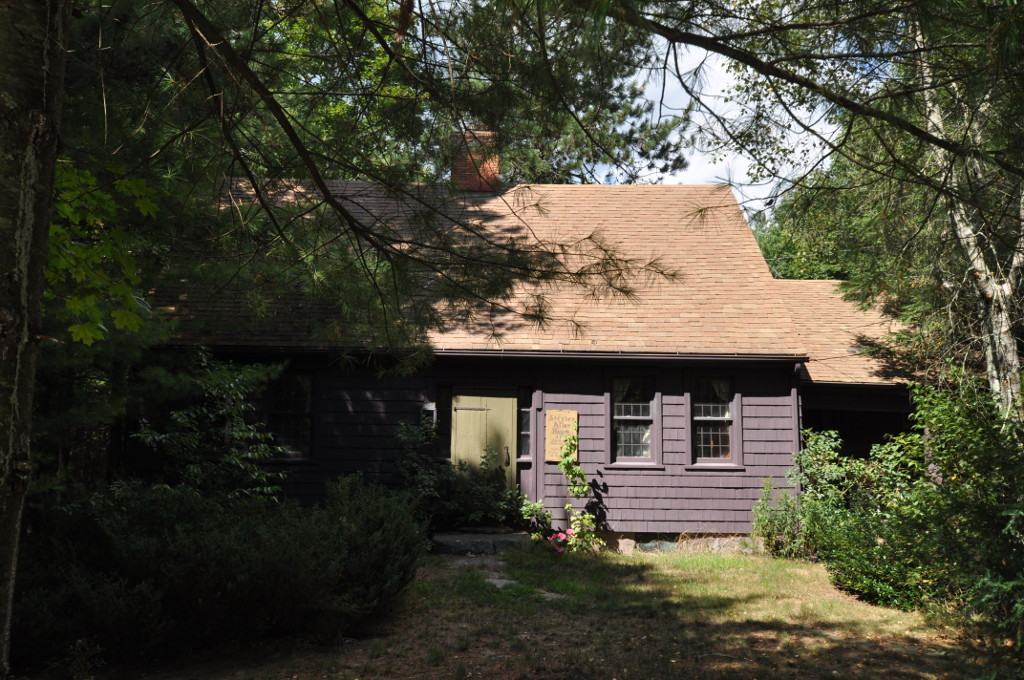

- Location within Rhode Island Location within the United States
- Location: West Greenwich, Rhode Island
- Coordinates: 41°38′40″N 71°41′30″W
- Built: 1787
- Architect: Stephen Joseph Allen
- NRHP reference No.: 78000060
- Added to NRHP: September 20, 1978

The Stephen Allen House is an historic house on Sharp Street, on the northeast corner of its junction with Rhode Island Route 102, in West Greenwich, Rhode Island. The main block of this 1 1/2-story Cape style wood-frame house was built c. 1787 by Stephen Allen, a farmer. The house is five bays wide, with a central chimney and a center entry which is framed by a later Greek Revival surround. There is a 1 1/2-story ell extending to the east (right) of the main block. To the east of the main house stands what originally appeared to be a shed that has since been converted for use as a small horse stable. Evidence suggests this structure was built sometime before 1862 as a store.

The house was listed on the National Register of Historic Places in 1978.

== See also ==
- National Register of Historic Places listings in Kent County, Rhode Island
