= List of television stations in Rhode Island =

The following broadcast television stations are licensed in the U.S. state of Rhode Island.

== Full-power ==
- Stations are arranged by media market served and channel position.

Full-power television stations in Rhode Island
Media market	Station	Channel	Primary affiliation(s)	Notes	Refs
Providence	WJAR	10	NBC		
Providence	WPRI-TV	12	CBS, MyNetworkTV on 12.2		
Providence	WPVD-TV	36	PBS		
Providence	WNAC-TV	64	Fox, The CW on 64.2		
Providence	WPXQ-TV	69	Ion Television	(Note: Licensed to Newport, Rhode Island.)	

== Low-power ==
Low-power television stations in Rhode Island
Media market	Station	Channel	Primary affiliation(s)	Notes	Refs
Providence	WYCN-LD	8	Telemundo, TeleXitos on 8.2		
Providence	WRIW-CD	51	Telemundo	(Note: Translator of WYCN-LD.)	

== Defunct ==
- WNET Providence (1954–1955)

== Notes ==
WLNE out of New Bedford, Massachusetts serves as the market's ABC affiliate.
