= List of colleges and universities in Rhode Island =

Map of colleges and universities in Rhode Island

This is a list of colleges and universities in the U.S. state of Rhode Island. There are currently 13 accredited, degree-granting institutions operating in the state, including two research universities, a community college, and a school of art.

Two of the state's public institutions are administered by the Rhode Island Board of Education. The other, the University of Rhode Island, is overseen by its own board of trustees. The state operates two public universities, the University of Rhode Island and Rhode Island College, as well as the Community College of Rhode Island, which offers degrees at six locations. The Naval War College, operated by the federal United States Navy, is located in Newport. The oldest school in the state is Brown University, a member of the Ivy League and the only Rhode Island institution founded before the American Revolution. The newest college is College Unbound, a degree completion school in Providence. Enrollment sizes range from College Unbound at 494 students to the University of Rhode Island, the state's flagship public university, with 17,210 students.

The institutions included on this list are all regionally accredited by the New England Commission of Higher Education.

== Institutions ==
| School | Location(s) | Control | Type (Note: The types listed here are as categorized in the Carnegie Classification of Institutions of Higher Education.) | Enrollment (Note: Enrollment is the total 12-month unduplicated headcount listed by IPEDS for 2024-2025.) (Fall 2024) | Founded |
|---|---|---|---|---|---|
| Brown University | Providence | Private | Doctoral university | 11,956 | 1764 |
| Bryant University | Smithfield | Private | Master's university | 3,636 | 1863 |
| College Unbound | Providence | Private | Special-focus institution | 494 | 2009 |
| Community College of Rhode Island | 6 locations (Note: Four campuses Warwick (Knight), Lincoln (Flanagan), Providence (Liston), and Newport, and two satellite facilities used in local partnerships located in Westerly and Woonsocket.) | Public | Associate's college | 12,275 | 1964 |
| Johnson & Wales University | Providence | Private | Master's university | 7,152 | 1914 |
| Naval War College | Newport | Public (Federal) | Master's university (Note: The Naval War College is not categorized by the Carnegie Classification. However, it is comparable to the Naval Postgraduate School, which is categorized as a masters university.) | 2,259 | 1884 |
| New England Institute of Technology | East Greenwich | Private | Doctoral university | 1,922 | 1940 |
| Providence College | Providence | Private (Catholic) | Master's university | 4,666 | 1917 |
| Rhode Island College | Providence | Public | Master's university | 6,155 | 1854 |
| Rhode Island School of Design | Providence | Private | School of art | 2,520 | 1877 |
| Roger Williams University | Bristol | Private | Master's university | 4,834 (Note: The enrollment count for Roger Williams University includes 484 students at the School of Law, which is listed as a separate school in IPEDS.) | 1956 |
| Salve Regina University | Newport | Private (Catholic) | Master's university | 2,791 | 1934 |
| University of Rhode Island | Kingston | Public | Doctoral university | 17,210 | 1892 |

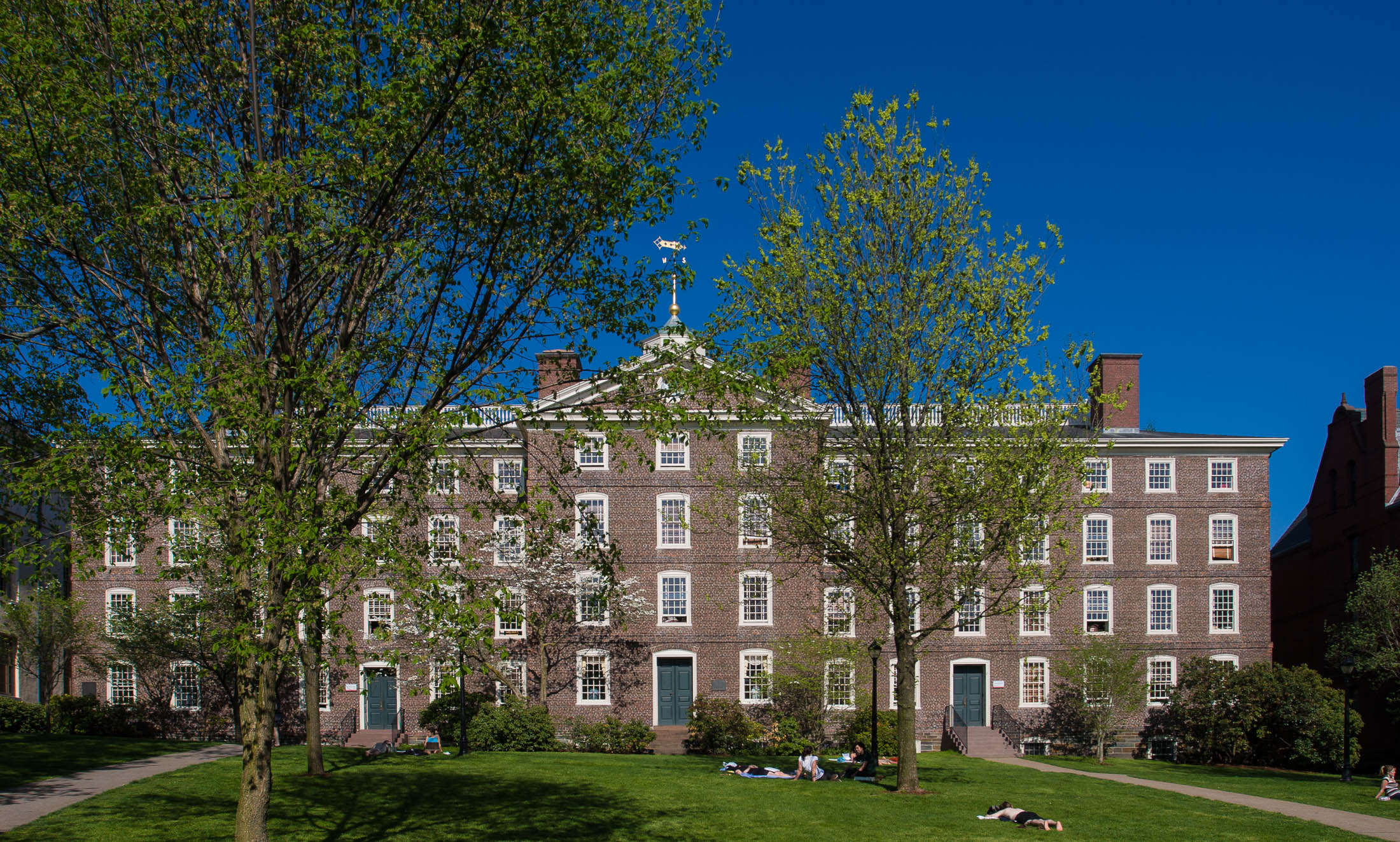
University Hall at Brown University

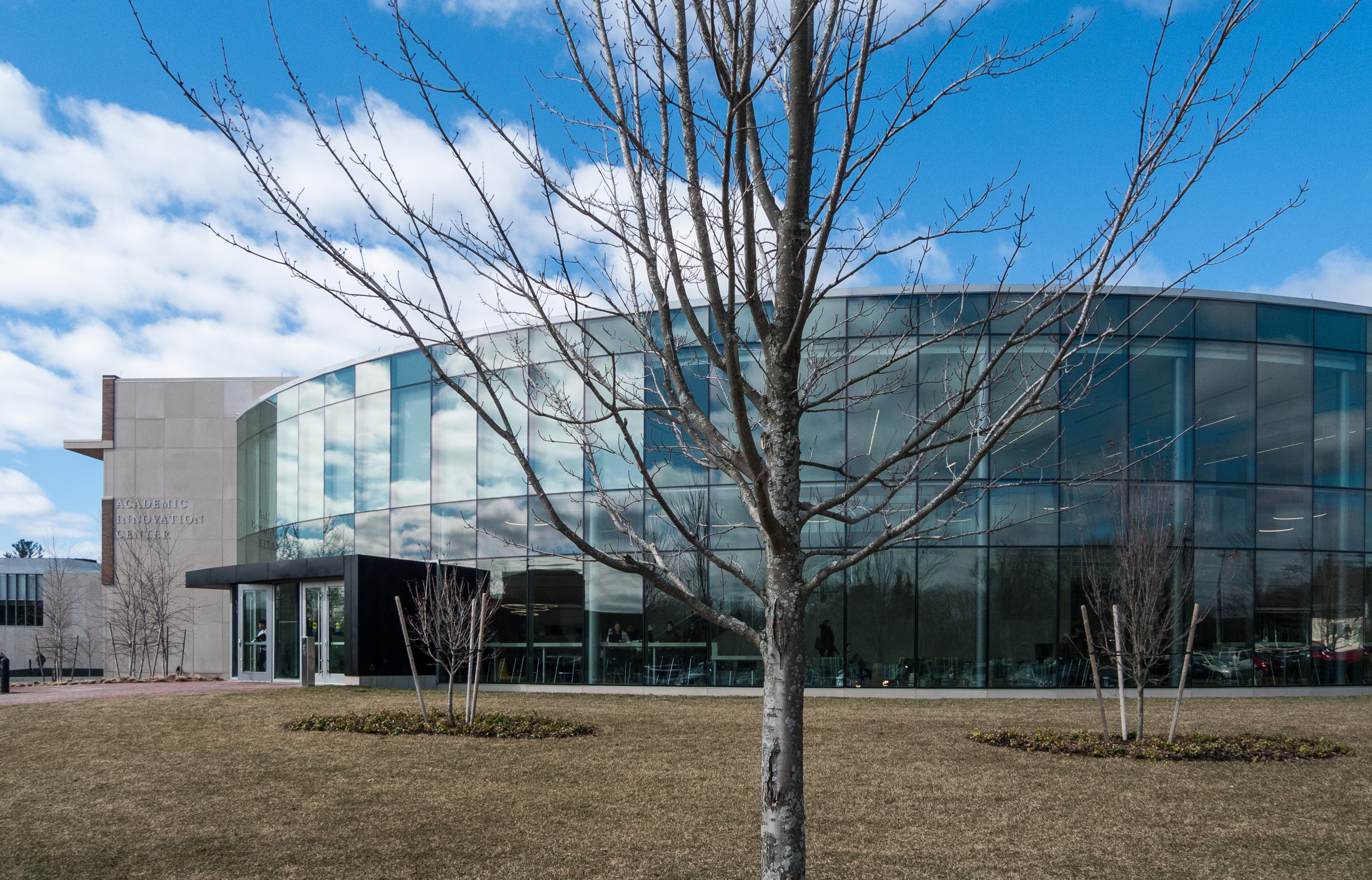
The Academic Innovation Center at Bryant University

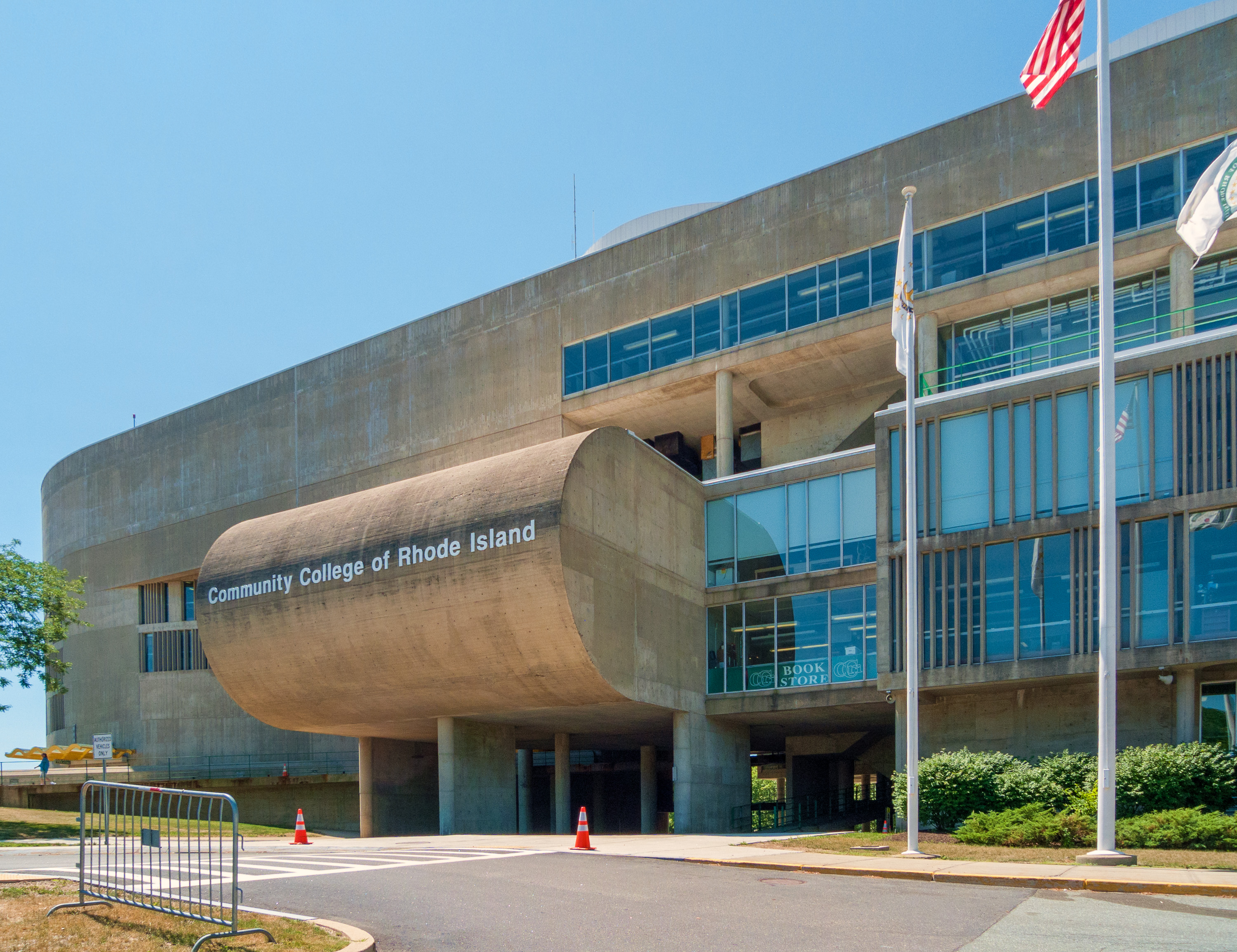
Community College of Rhode Island, Knight Campus

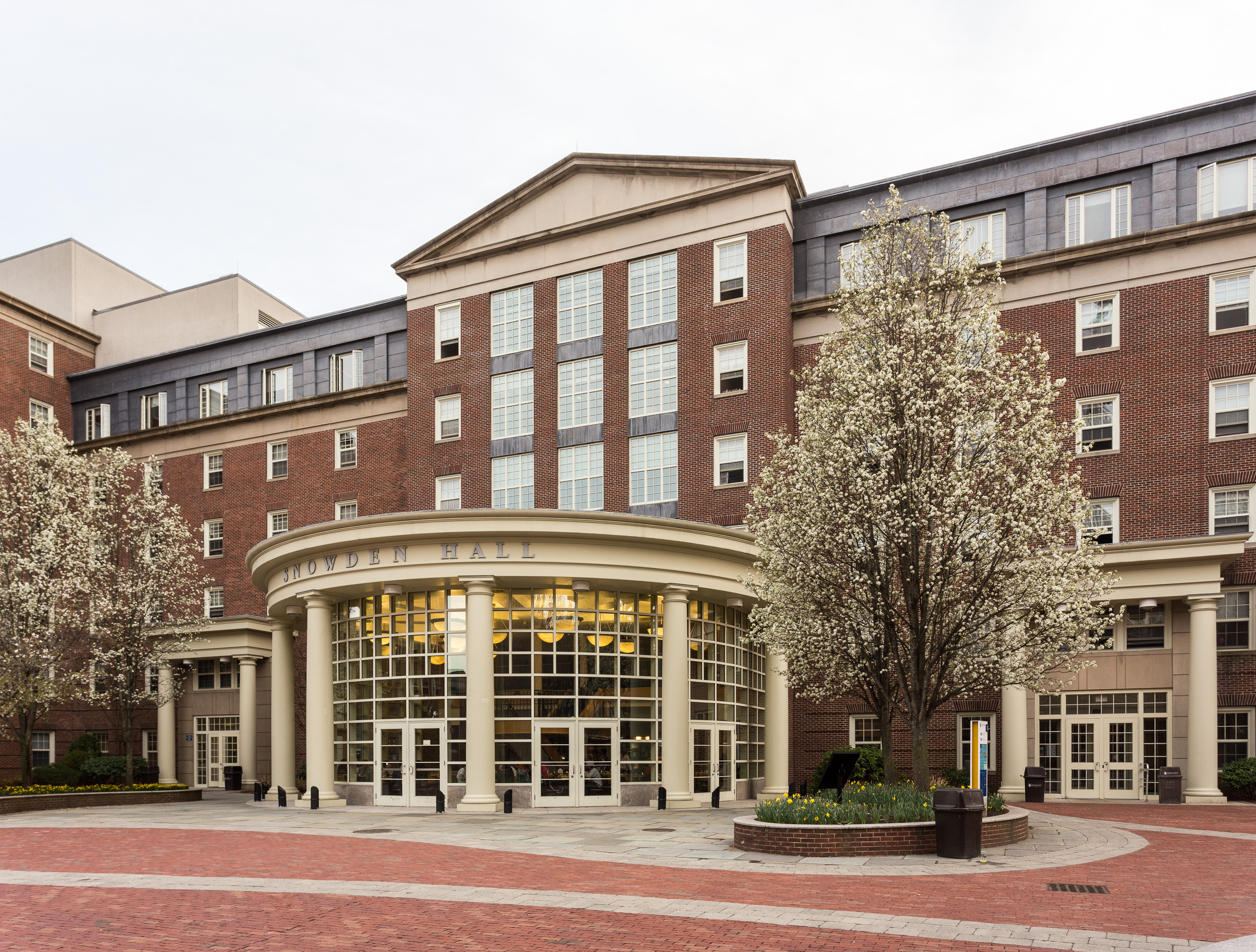
Snowden Hall at Johnson & Wales University

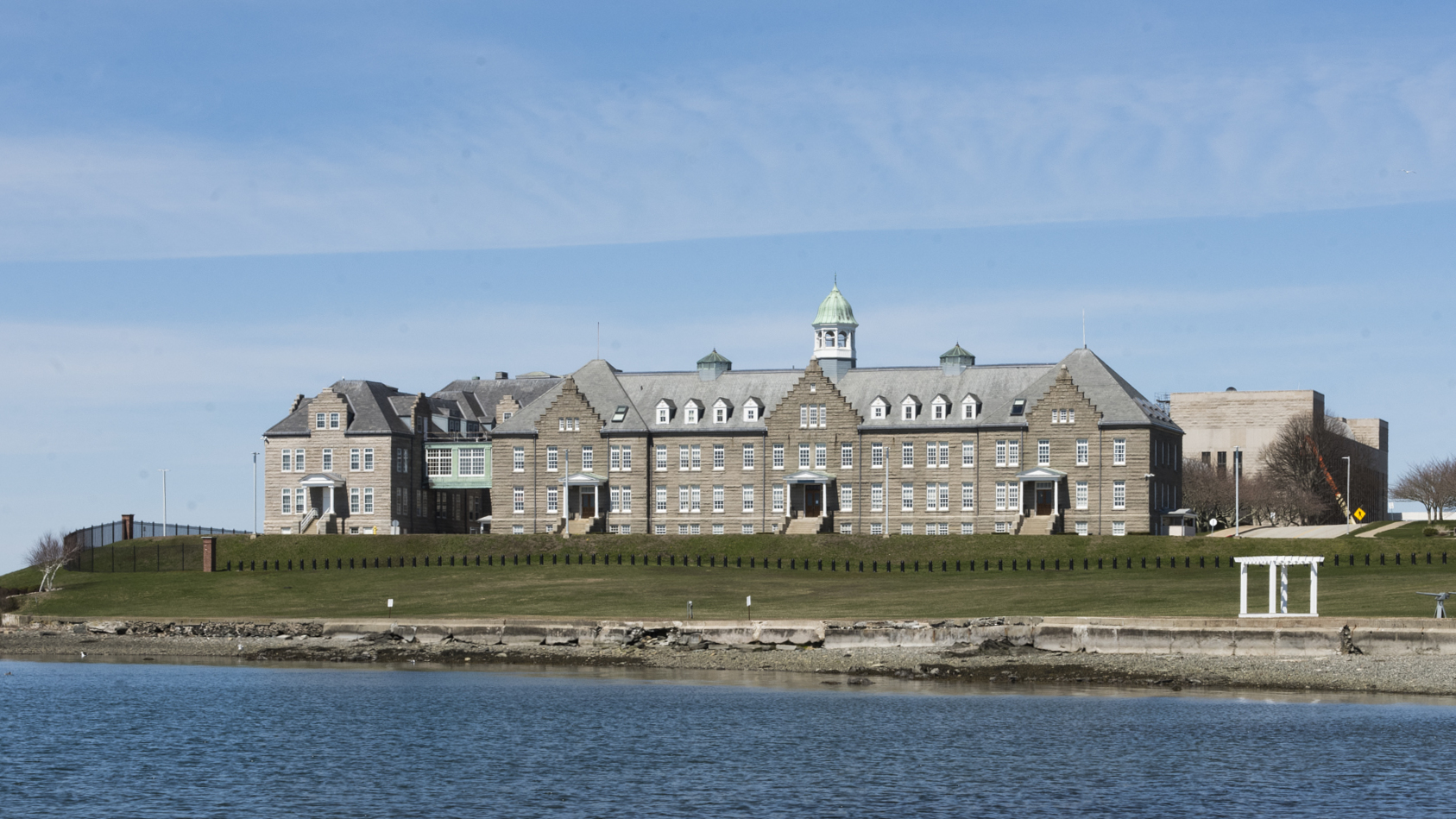
Luce Hall at Naval War College

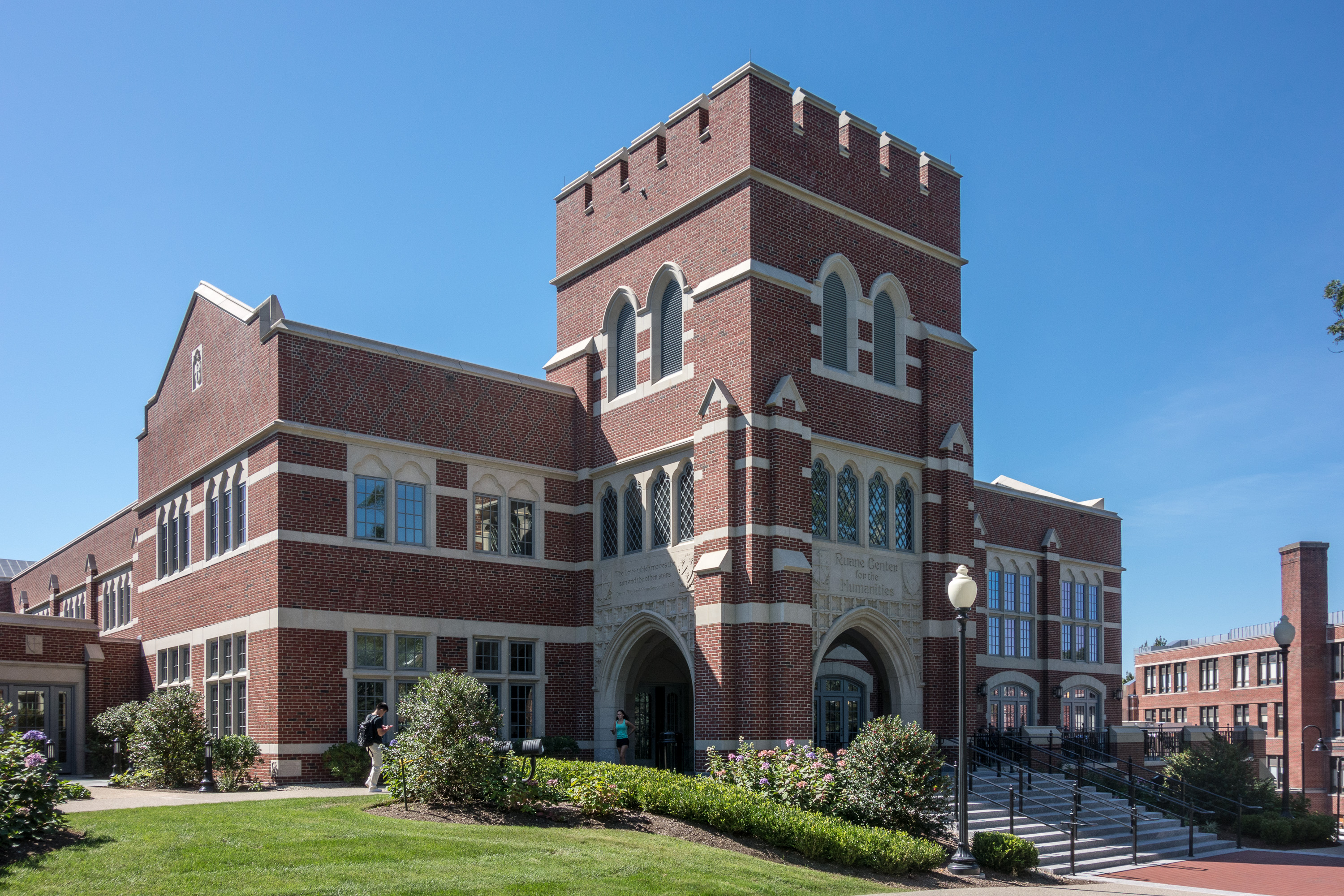
The Ruane Center at Providence College

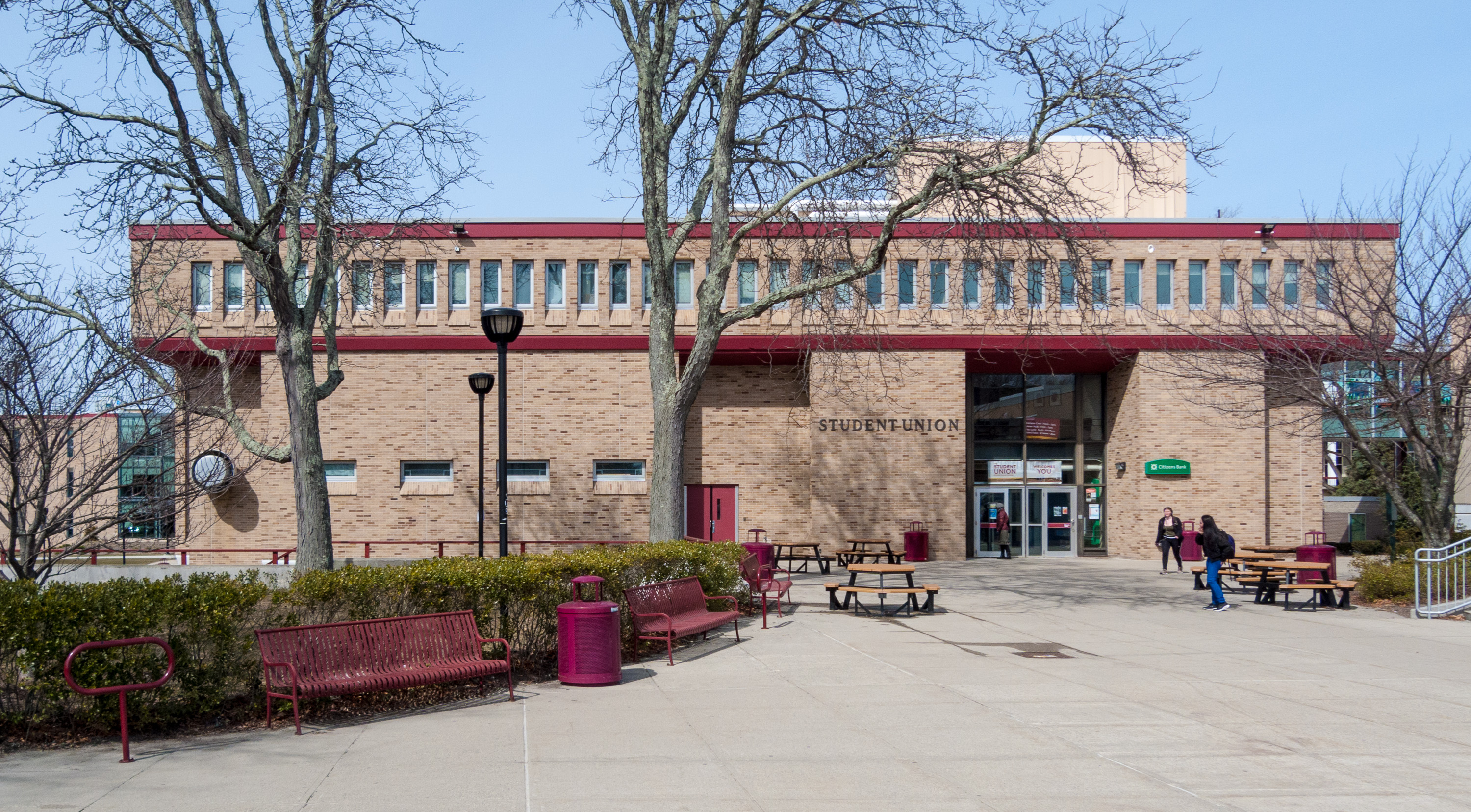
The Student Union at Rhode Island College

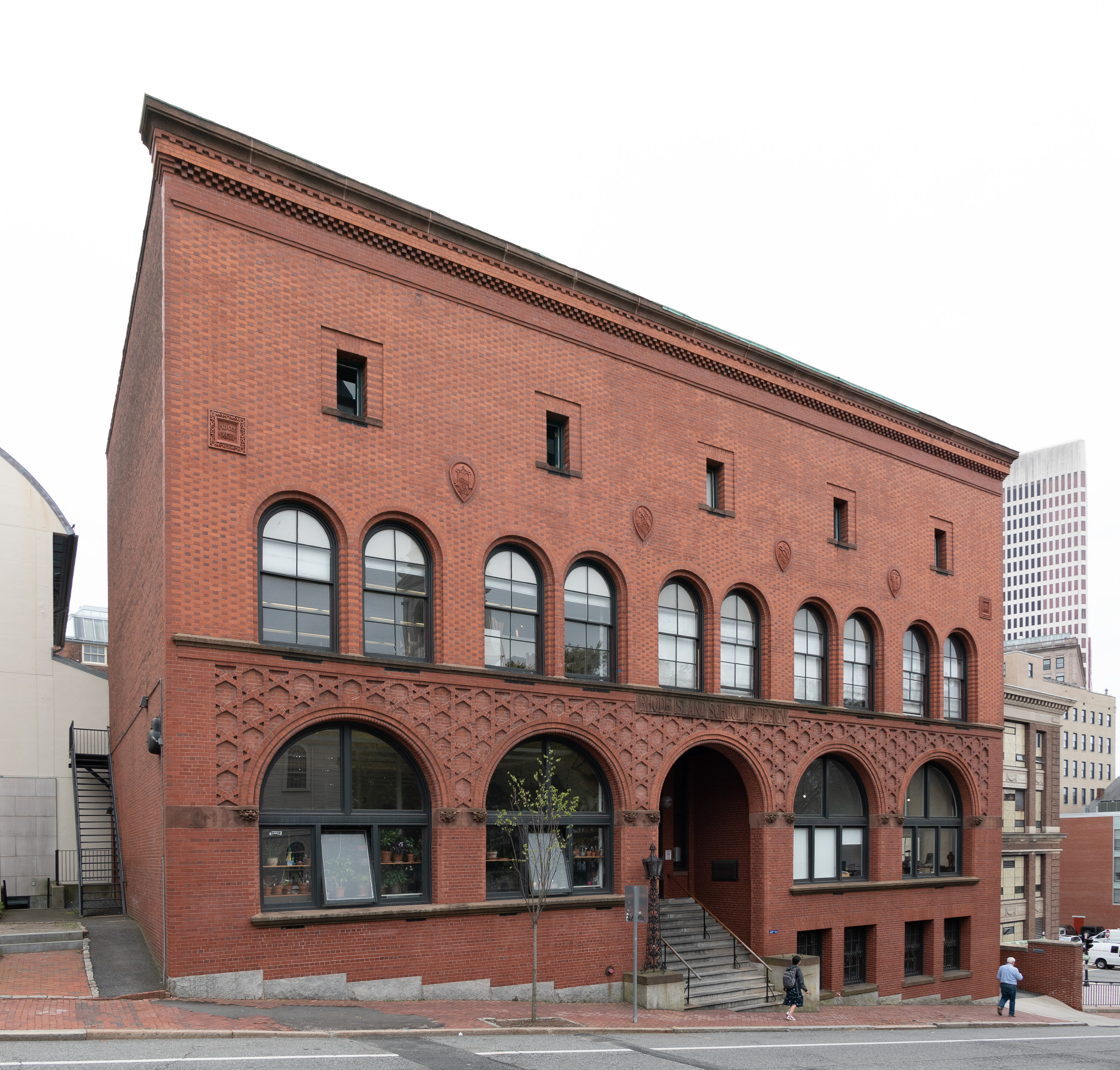
The Waterman Building at the Rhode Island School of Design

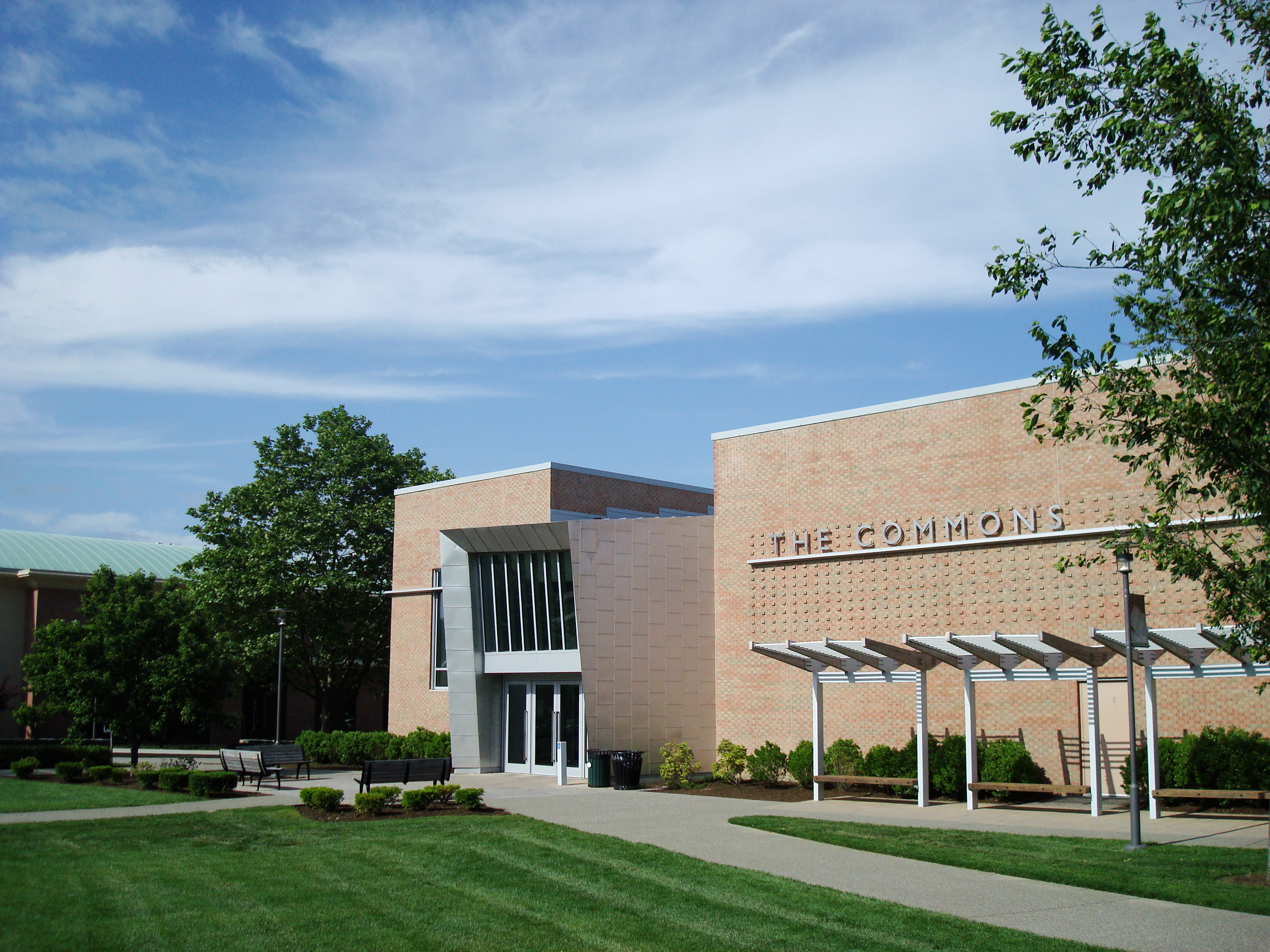
The Commons at Roger Williams University

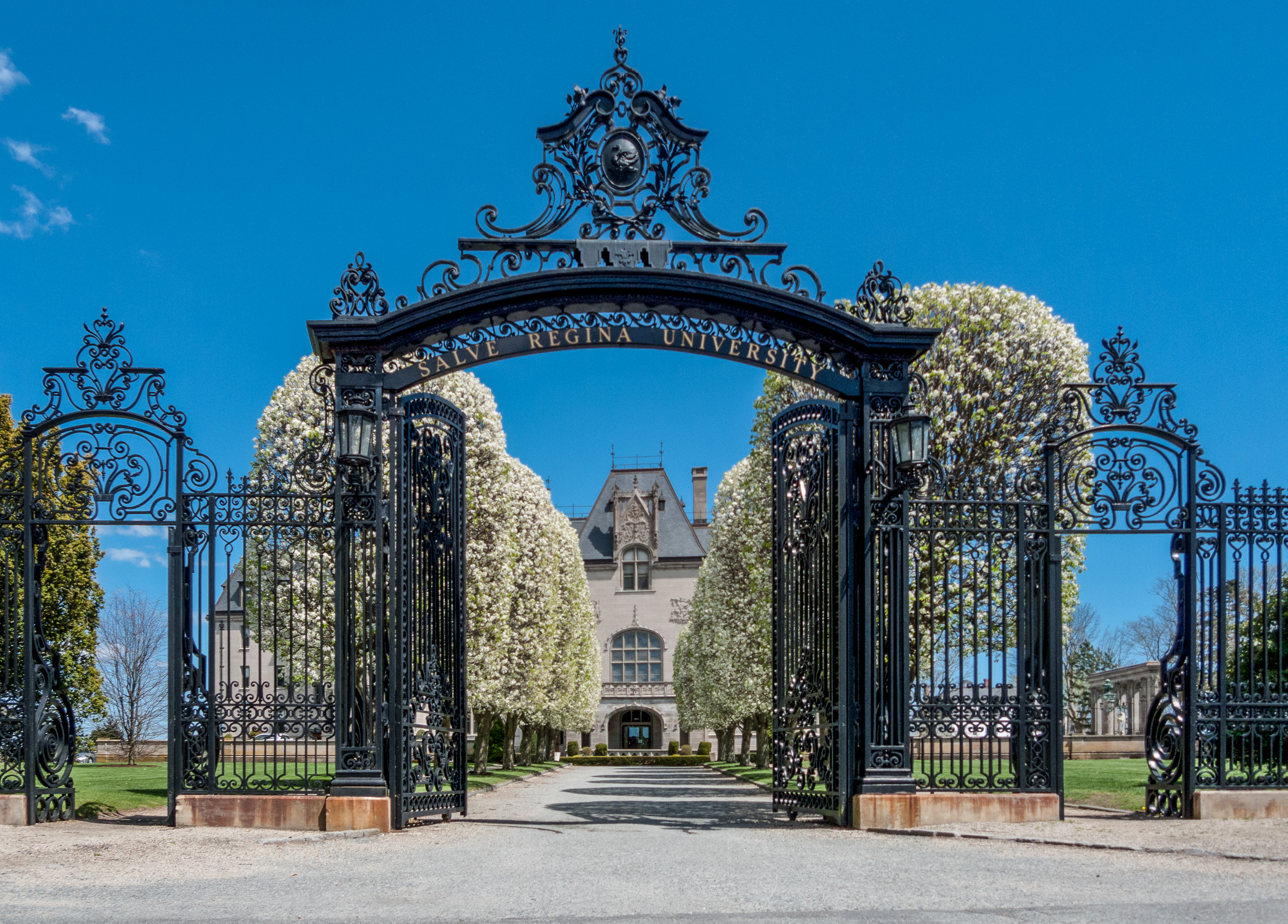
The gates of Salve Regina University

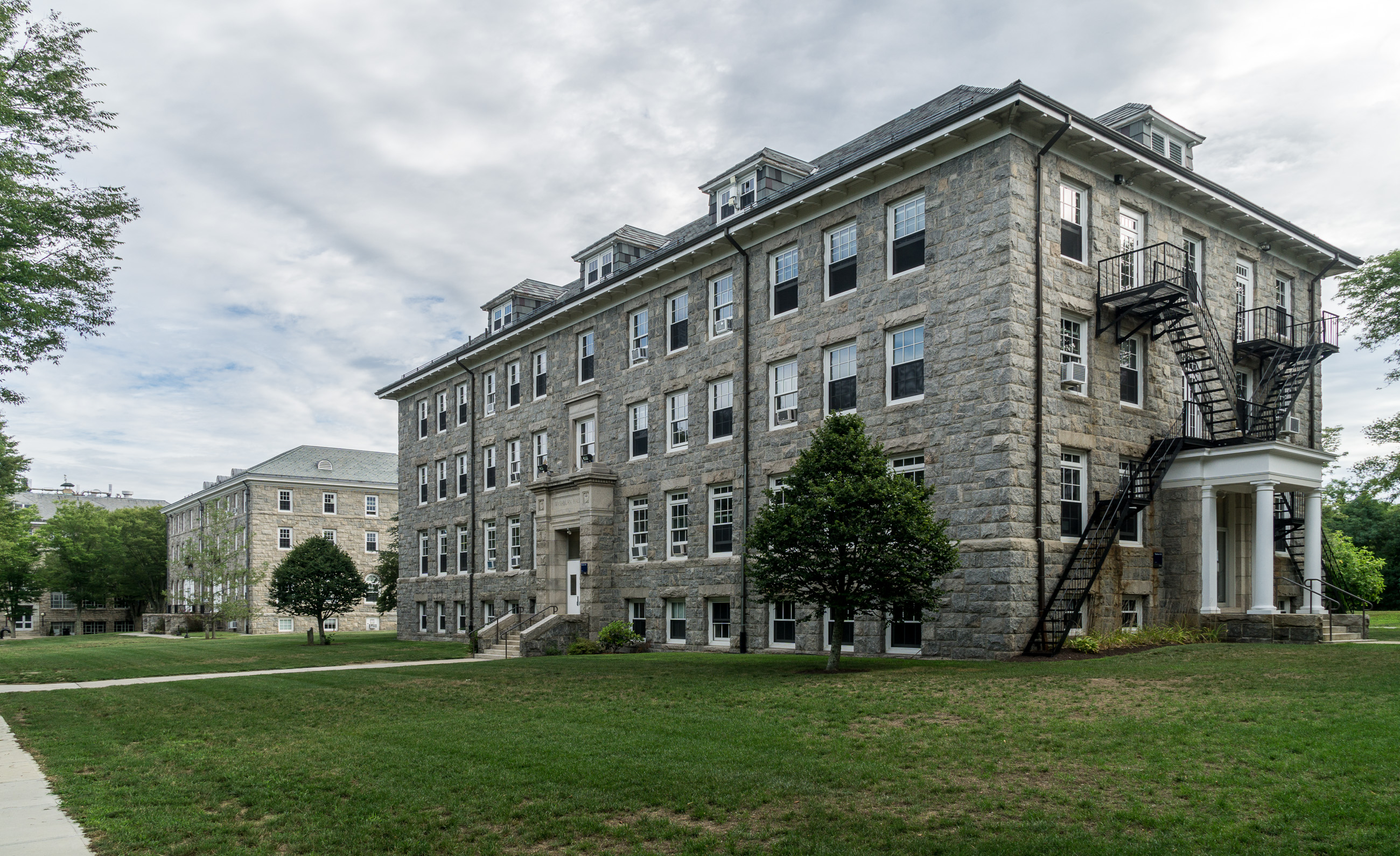
East Hall and Washburn Hall at the University of Rhode Island

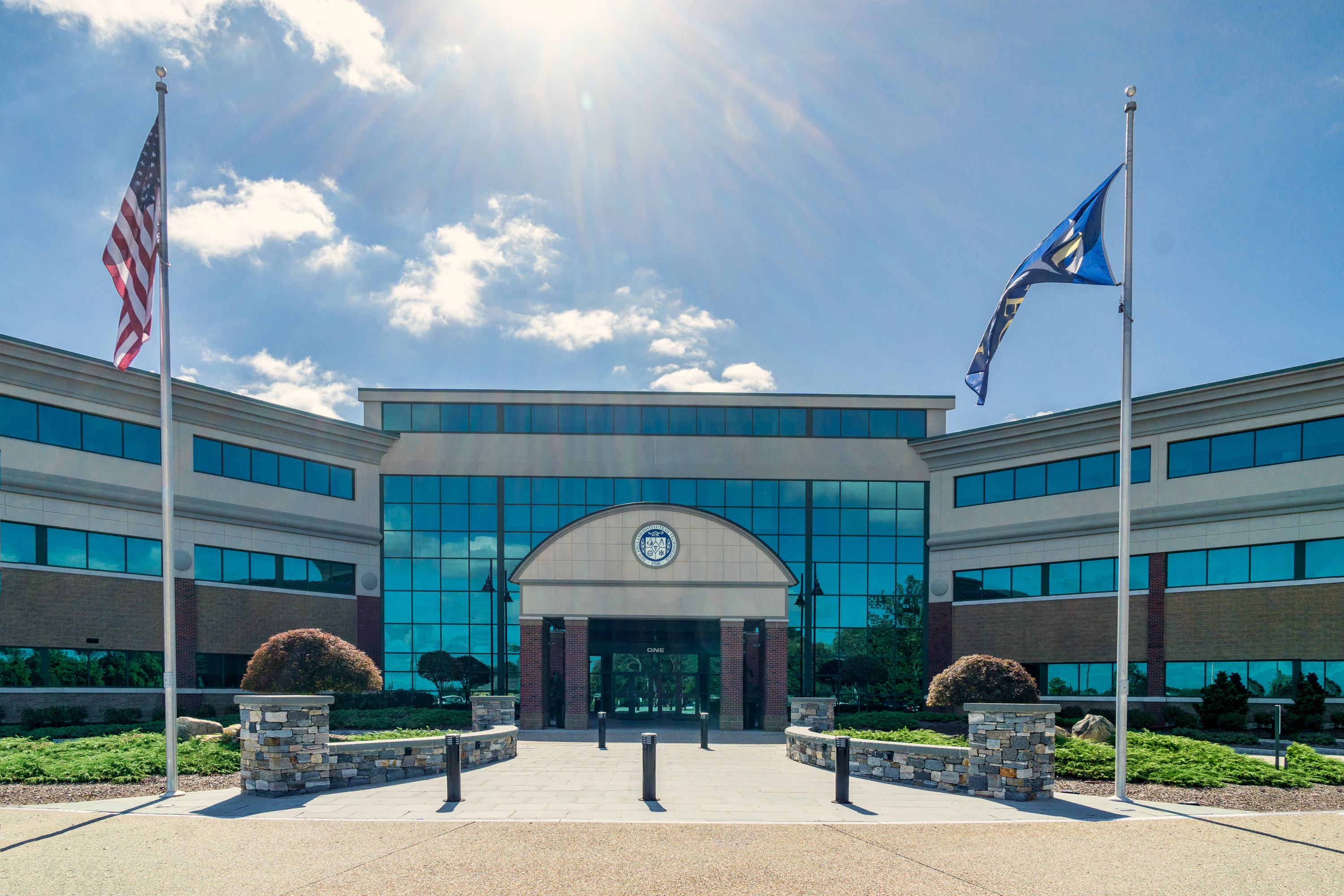
The entrance to the New England Institute of Technology

== Defunct institutions ==
| School | Location(s) | Founded | Closed |
|---|---|---|---|
| Barrington College | Barrington | 1900 | 1985 |
| Gibbs College | Cranston | 1911 | 2009 |
| Mount Saint Joseph College | Wakefield | | 1975 |
| Rhode Island College of Pharmacy and Allied Sciences | Providence | 1902 | 1957 |
| Scholfield's Commercial College | Providence | 1846 | ? |
| Seminary of Our Lady of Providence | Warwick | 1939 | 1975 |

== See also ==
- Higher education in the United States
- List of college athletic programs in Rhode Island
- List of American institutions of higher education
