= West Greenwich, Rhode Island =

- Town
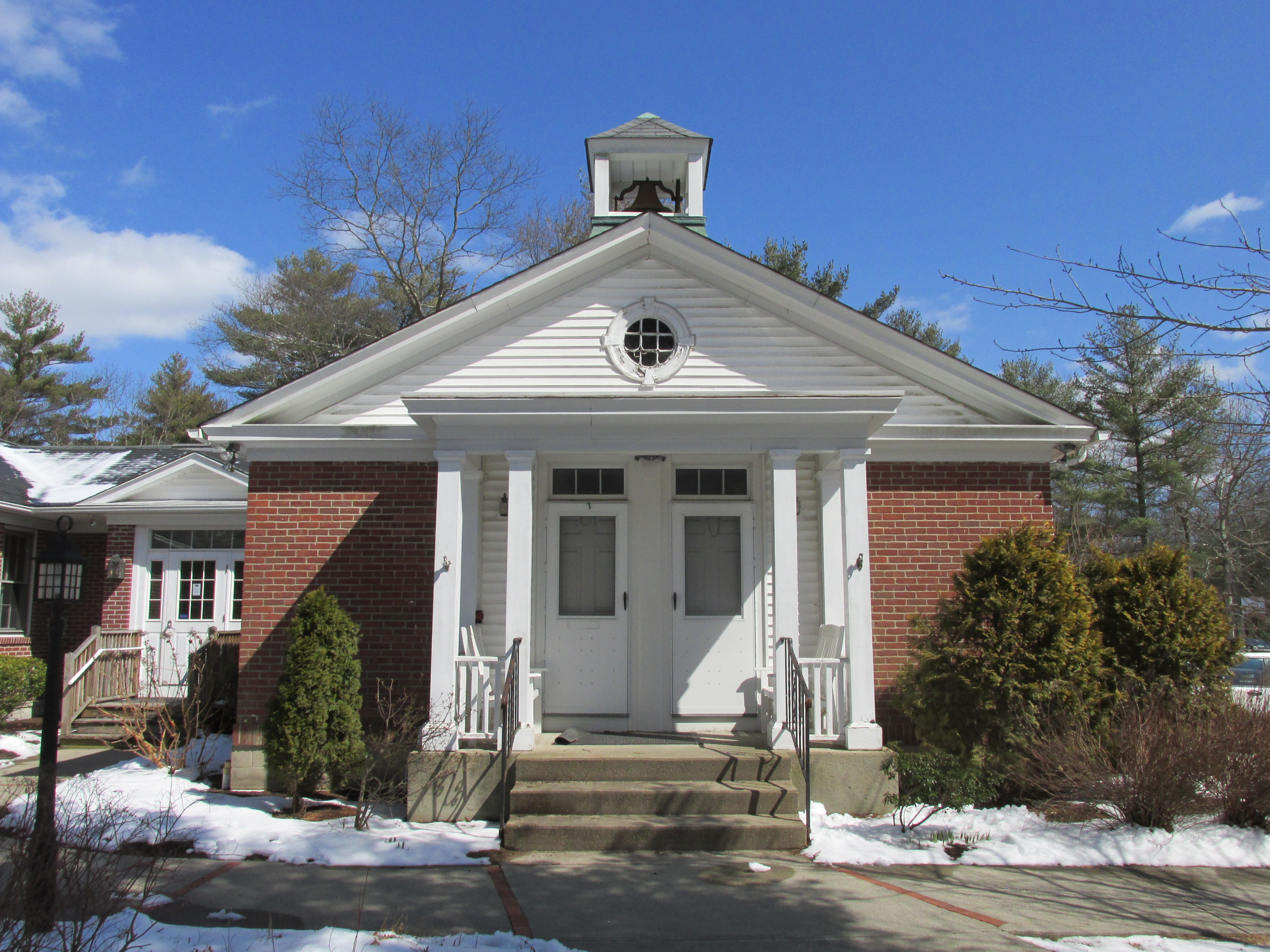
- Louttit Library

- Seal Logo

- Location in Kent County and the state of Rhode Island.
- Coordinates: 41°37′46″N 71°39′37″W
- Country: United States
- State: Rhode Island
- County: Kent

Government
  - Type: Five-member Town council
  - Town Council: Mark Tourgee (R); Mark Boyer (R); Sheryl Green (R); Lee Kissinger (R); Thomas E. Mulcahey (R)

Area
  - Total: 51.3 sq mi (132.9 km^{2})
  - Land: 50.6 sq mi (131.1 km^{2})
  - Water: 0.69 sq mi (1.8 km^{2})
- Elevation: 472 ft (144 m)

Population (2020)
  - Total: 6,528
  - Density: 129/sq mi (49.8/km^{2})
- Time zone: UTC−5 (Eastern (EST))
  - Summer (DST): UTC−4 (EDT)
- ZIP Code: 02817
- Area code: 401
- FIPS code: 44-77720
- GNIS feature ID: 1220059
- Website: www.wgtownri.org

West Greenwich is a town in Kent County, Rhode Island, United States. The population was 6,528 at the 2020 census. West Greenwich was named for the historic town of Greenwich, Kent, England. It was separated from East Greenwich in 1741. Students go to Exeter-West Greenwich Regional School District in West Greenwich.

== Geography ==
According to the United States Census Bureau, the town has a total area of 51.3 square miles (133 km^{2}), of which, 50.6 square miles (131 km^{2}) of it is land and 0.7 square miles (1.8 km^{2}) of it (1.34%) is water. Escoheag Hill is located within the town and is the site of a former ski area. Wickaboxet State Forest is also located in West Greenwich.

== Demographics ==
Historical population
Census	Pop.	Note	%±
1790	2,054		—
1800	1,757		−14.5%
1810	1,619		−7.9%
1820	1,927		19.0%
1830	1,817		−5.7%
1840	1,415		−22.1%
1850	1,350		−4.6%
1860	1,258		−6.8%
1870	1,133		−9.9%
1880	1,018		−10.2%
1890	798		−21.6%
1900	606		−24.1%
1910	481		−20.6%
1920	367		−23.7%
1930	402		9.5%
1940	526		30.8%
1950	847		61.0%
1960	1,169		38.0%
1970	1,841		57.5%
1980	2,738		48.7%
1990	3,492		27.5%
2000	5,085		45.6%
2010	6,135		20.6%
2020	6,528		6.4%
U.S. Decennial Census

As of the 2020 U.S. census, there were 6,528 people and 2,401 households in the town. The population density was 129.8 inhabitants per square mile (50.1/km^{2}). There were 2,575 housing units in the town. The racial makeup of the town was 89.89% White, 0.84% African American, 0.19% American Indian, 2.82% Asian, 1.01% from other races, and 5.24% from two or more races. Hispanic or Latino of any race were 2.27% of the population.

Of the 2,401 households, 32.4% had children under the age of 18 living with them, 69.1% were married couples living together, 18.4% had a female householder with no spouse present, and 6.7% had a male householder with no spouse present. 6.7% of households were one person and 1.0% were one person aged 65 or older. The average household size was 2.73 and the average family size was 2.89.

The age distribution was 17.9% under the age of 18, 6.6% from 18 to 24, 27.9% from 25 to 44, 29.7% from 45 to 64, and 18.0% 65 or older. The median age was 43.7 years.

The median household income was $137,485 and the median family income was $137,993. 1.8% of the population were below the poverty line. Out of the total population, 0.0% of those under the age of 18 and 0.0% of those 65 and older were living below the poverty line.

== Government ==
West Greenwich town vote by party in presidential elections
Year	GOP	DEM	Others
2024	59.14% 2,413	38.55% 1,573	2.31% 94
2020	56.05% 2,242	42.33% 1,693	1.62% 65
2016	57.88% 1,953	34.35% 1,159	7.77% 262
2012	50.28% 1,590	47.53% 1,503	2.18% 69
2008	48.65% 1,567	49.39% 1,591	1.96% 63
2004	51.66% 1,466	45.81% 1,300	2.54% 72
2000	43.80% 1,035	48.24% 1,140	7.96% 188
1996	35.67% 808	45.96% 1,041	18.37% 416
1992	32.96% 773	34.54% 810	32.49% 762
1988	58.45% 989	41.19% 697	0.35% 6

In the Rhode Island Senate, West Greenwich is split into three senatorial districts, one of which is currently held by Democrat Leonidas P. Raptakis (District 33) and other by Republican Elaine J. Morgan (District 34). The other, District 21, is currently vacant but was last held by Republican Nicholas D. Kettle before his resignation in February 2018 following a sex scandal. At the federal level, West Greenwich is a part of Rhode Island's 2nd congressional district, which is currently represented by James R. Langevin.

In presidential elections, West Greenwich tends to be a fairly independent or swing municipality with a slight Republican tilt. That red lean was strengthened in 2016 when Donald Trump won the town by 23.5 points, the best performance for a Republican in the town in three decades.

== Historic places ==
- Louttit Library (1936)
- West Greenwich Baptist Church and Cemetery (1822)
- Stephen Allen House (1787)
- Hopkins Hollow Village (1728)
