= Flag of Rhode Island =

U.S. state flag

State of Rhode Island
- Use: Civil and state flag
- Proportion: 29:33
- Adopted: November 1, 1897; 129 years ago
- Design: A gold anchor, surrounded by 13 gold stars, on a field of white. A blue ribbon below the anchor contains the text "hope"; Argent an anchor above a ribbon Azure with the word Hope, all surrounded by thirteen mullets.
- Fringed Design
- Use: Civil and state flag
- Proportion: 29:33
- Adopted: November 1, 1897; 129 years ago
- Design: A gold anchor, surrounded by 13 gold stars, on a field of white. A blue ribbon below the anchor contains the text "hope"; Argent an anchor above a ribbon Azure with the word Hope, all surrounded by thirteen mullets. Edged with yellow fringe.

The state flag of Rhode Island is the official flag of the U.S. state of Rhode Island, consisting of a white background and a gold anchor in the center (a symbol for hope) surrounded by thirteen gold stars, for the original Thirteen Colonies and Rhode Island's status as the 13th state to ratify the Constitution. A blue ribbon below the anchor bears the state's motto in gold: "HOPE". The flag is frequently depicted with golden fringe around the edges of the flag, although the fringe is never actually on the flag unless it is used in federal-level displays, much like the national flag.

== Statute ==
The 2024 Rhode Island General Laws, Title 42, Chapter 42-4, § 42-4-3, defines that the state flag shall be:

...white, five feet and six inches (5'6") fly and four feet and ten inches (4'10") deep on the pike, bearing on each side in the center a gold anchor, twenty-two inches (22") high, and underneath it a blue ribbon twenty-four inches (24") long and five inches (5") wide, or in these proportions, with the motto "Hope" in golden letters thereon, the whole surrounded by thirteen (13) golden stars in a circle.

The flag shall be edged with yellow fringe.

The pike shall be surmounted by a spearhead and the length of the pike shall be nine feet (9'), not including the spearhead.

== History ==
As early as the 1640s, the anchor and "hope" were found on the Rhode Island seal, and the seal's words and emblems were likely inspired by the biblical phrase "hope we have as an anchor of the soul," found in Hebrews 6:18-19. Rhode Island's earliest colonists were fleeing persecution in Massachusetts due to their religious beliefs.

=== State flag ===
==== Unofficial flags (before 1877) ====
In 1835, members of the Journal newspaper in Wilmington, Delaware, flew a state flag from the top of their office. The flag was similar to the American flag but with the states coat of arms on its field.

On July 4, 1840 the first state flag was flown over the state house; its design is not known.

During the 1856 Whig National Convention state delegates carried with them a flag. It had a blue and white field bearing the state’s coat of arms with the Latin motto "multum in parvo,” translating to "much in little."

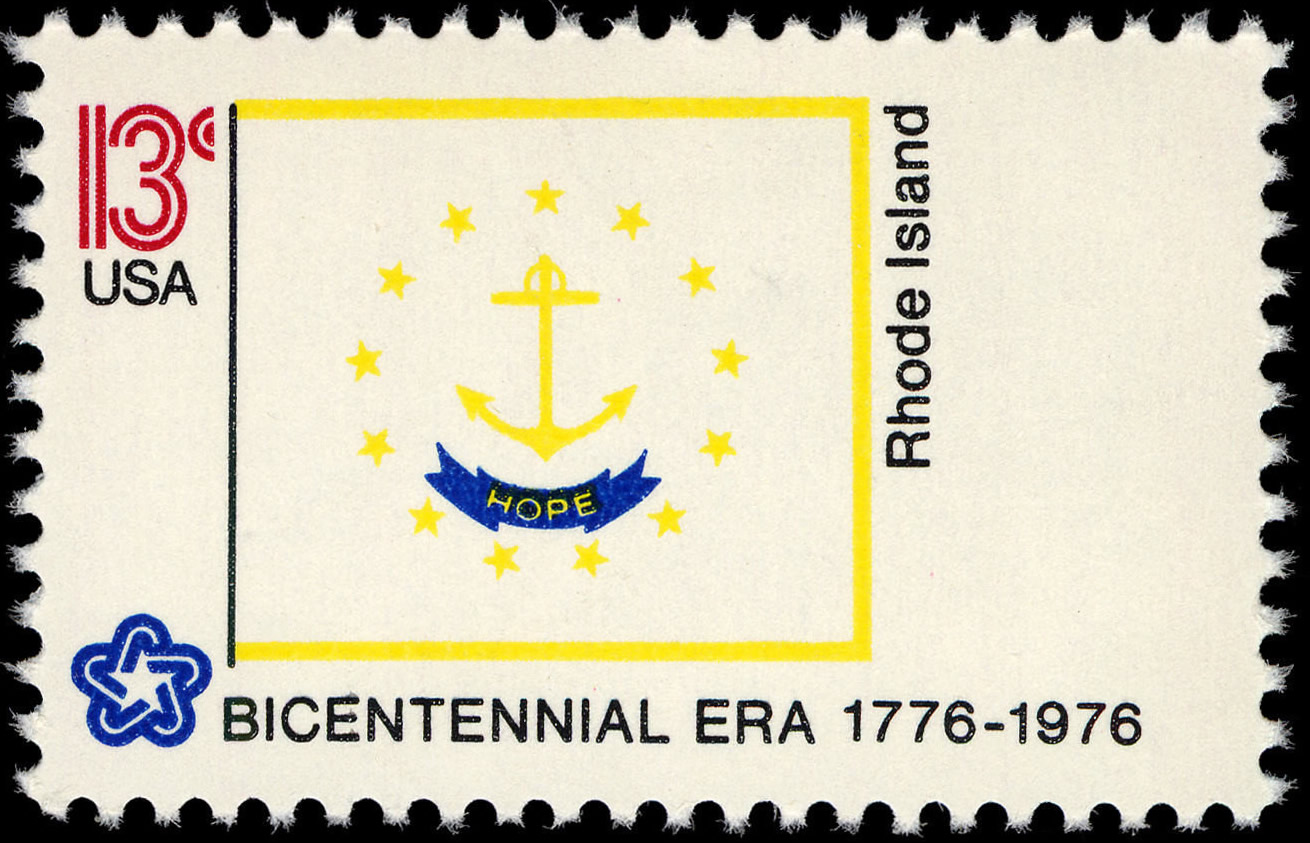
The Rhode Island state flag as depicted in the 1976 bicentennial postage stamp series

During the Civil War, the 2nd Rhode Island Infantry was given a state flag; it was made in California. The banner bore a blue field with the state's coat of arms and motto in the middle, all embroidered in sliver.

In 1875, a local Veterans association in Newport was given a flag. It was made by members of the Dr. Henry E. Truner's family, with the sewing done by Zena L. Hammond. It contain a blue field with state's coat of arms embroidered in gold.

==== Official flags ====
The first official flag of Rhode Island was adopted on March 30, 1877. The flag had a white background, a red shield with a blue anchor in the center, the word HOPE inscribed thereon the shield, and 38 blue stars encircling the shield. It was displayed at the Battle of Kings Mountain Centennial in 1880. The inscription "Kings Mountain; October 7, 1880" was later added to the flag.

The second flag of Rhode Island was adopted on February 1, 1882. This flag had 13 gold stars encircling a gold anchor on a blue field. The thirteen stars represented the original 13 states of the United States, of which Rhode Island was the 13th state.

In February 1897 the Adjutant-General wanted to change the state flag to one used during the American revolution. This current flag was adopted on November 1, 1897, following the Rhode Island General Assembly January Session of 1897.

=== Historical flags ===
The flag of Rhode Island from 1877 to 1882.

The flag of Rhode Island from 1882 to 1897.

Flag used since 1897.

== Design variations ==
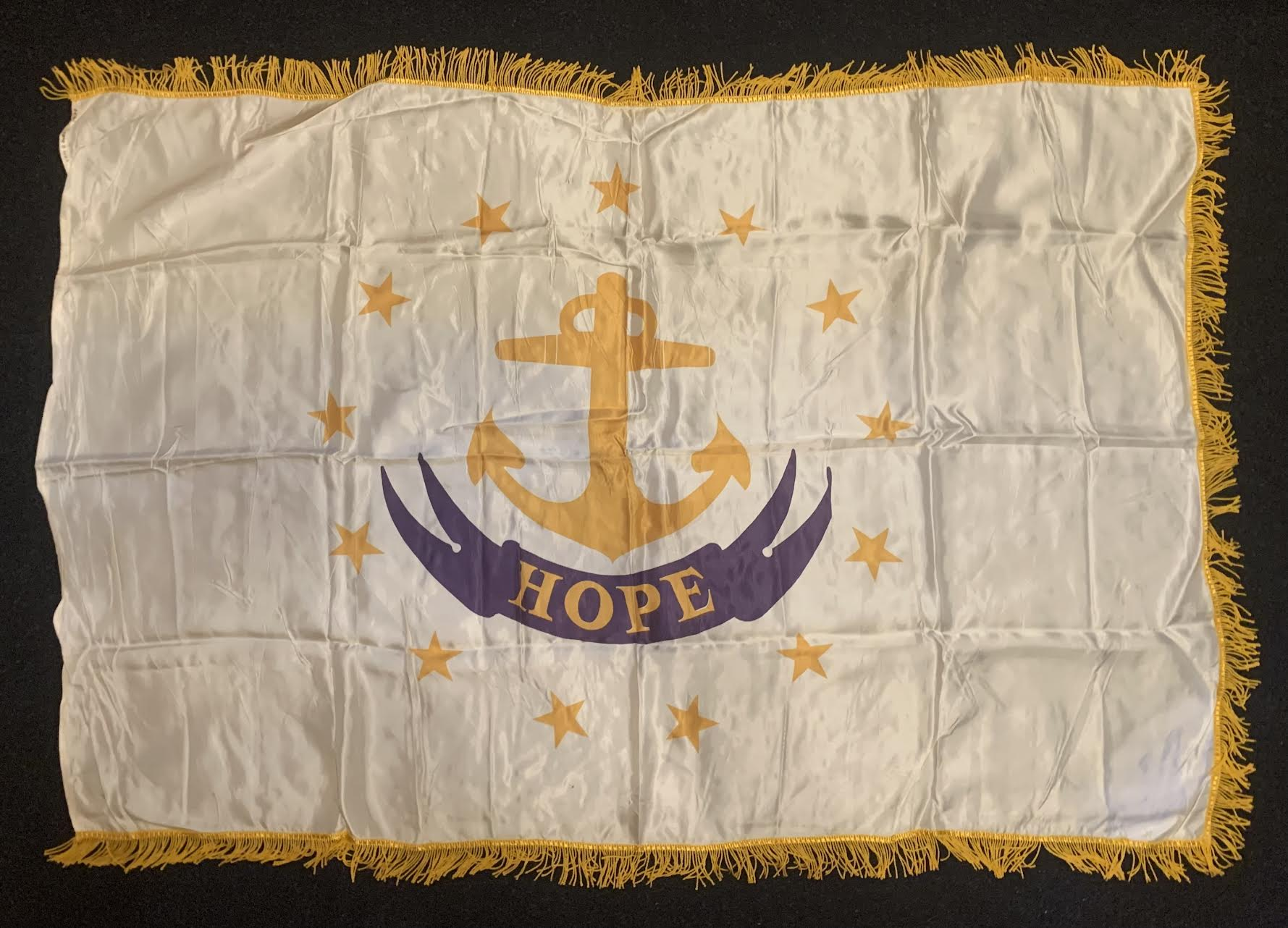
Older state flag featuring smaller stars

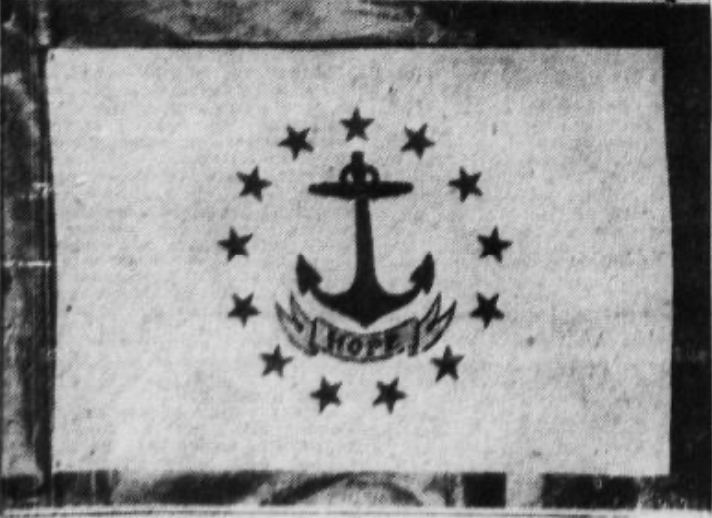
State flag from 1928 featuring a thicker border around the anchor

There are some design variations that are incorrect to the flag code. Most notably, most physical state flags use a rectangular size rather than the official 29:33 size. This is because the standard size on most flag printers is 3:5 and 2:3. Many physical flags in Rhode Island are commonly flown and displayed without a fringe or golden border at all,; however, some flags use a solid gold border to signify the gold fringe. Wikipedia used to display the Rhode Island flag with a solid gold border meant to be the gold fringe.

Some flag manufactures took earlier designs from Wikipedia and other sources which contained a gold border on three-sides representing the fringe of the flag, and produced physical flags with them not realizing that the gold border was meant to be fringe. It is common for some flags to have a blue trim around the stars and anchor, though this is not described in the flag code. The ribbon is sometimes depicted with a gold trim, though this is also not described in the flag code.

| Variation Image | Variation Description |
|---|---|
| | The official variation of the flag displayed at the official 29:33 size, with no trim around the ribbon or stars. This is displayed as a variation, as while the official flag of Rhode Island, it is still only one variant of the Rhode Island flag used by Rhode Islanders, the State of Rhode Island, and government officials. This flag has also come printed in a 3:5 and 2:3 format with the standard size on most flag printers, and to match the flag of the United States, which is commonly printed or embroidered in sizes other than the official 10:19. |
| | The official Fringed variation of the flag displayed at the official 29:33 size, with no trim around the ribbon or stars. This is displayed as a variation, adhering to The Rhode Island General Laws § 42-4-3:The flag shall be edged with yellow fringe. Because the fringe is delicate and can easily get tangled or torn by the wind, it is used exclusively for indoor displays, parades, and official government ceremonies, and never for outdoor flagpoles of general public use. |
| | A gold anchor, surrounded by 13 gold stars, with the stars and anchor containing a blue trim on a field of white. A blue ribbon with a golden trim is displayed below the anchor contains the text "hope"; Argent an anchor above a ribbon Azure with the word ''Hope'', all surrounded by thirteen mullets. This design has been branded by marketers as meeting the official specifications of the State of Rhode Island, however is commonly printed in a 3:5 canvas rather than the official 29:33 proportion ratio. |
| | A 3D-design gold anchor surrounded by 13 gold stars with thin blue trims, with a high definition blue ribbon with a golden trim is displayed below the anchor contains the text "hope". This misattributed design is marked as the official flag of Rhode Island by Encyclopædia Britannica, with many using this design for the official flag rather than the official design. This design has been used and seen used by Rhode Island government officials, however it is not the official design to Rhode Island's official government website and other government sources. |
| | This variation of the flag uses the same anchor and ribbon design as the official design, but it uses thicker 5-pointed stars and a digital printed fringe, or golden border, rather than an actual fringe. This design for a timeframe made headlines of Rhode Island Friday Flagging on a blog article called "RI’s Yellow “Border” and Wikipedia’s Influence on Civic Design," with the origin of the misprinted design originating from the fringe being displayed on Wikipedia with the flag from 3 June 2011, to 8 March 2019, before being removed. |

== Other flags ==
=== Regional flags ===
The state of Rhode Island, while it does not have county governments, the towns and cities of the state of Rhode Island have their own flags.

=== Standard of the governor ===
The standard of the governor of Rhode Island

The standard of the governor of Rhode Island is a white flag with the Coat of arms of Rhode Island in the center of the flag with 4 blue 5-point stars. The standard of the governor is commonly flown at a proportion rate of 3:5 or 2:3.

=== Flags associated with Rhode Island ===
The flag of New England and flag of the Rhode Island Regiment, are two examples of flags many houses throughout the state display the flag alongside the current flag, or in lieu of the state flag, or seen flying at home football games of the University of Rhode Island Rams.

After the union of England and Scotland, some New England ensigns used the British Union Flag rather than the St George's Cross.

The first flag (and ensign) of New England, used by Colonial merchant ships sailing out of New England ports, 1686-c. 1737.

The Flag of New England during the Revolutionary War.

Flag flown during the Dominion of New England using the personal standard of Edmund Andros.

Rhode Island Regimental Flag

== See also ==
- Flags of the U.S. states and territories
- State of Rhode Island
- Symbols of Rhode Island
- Seal of the Rhode Island
- Coat of arms of Rhode Island
