= Pequot Trail =

Hiking trail in Connecticut, US

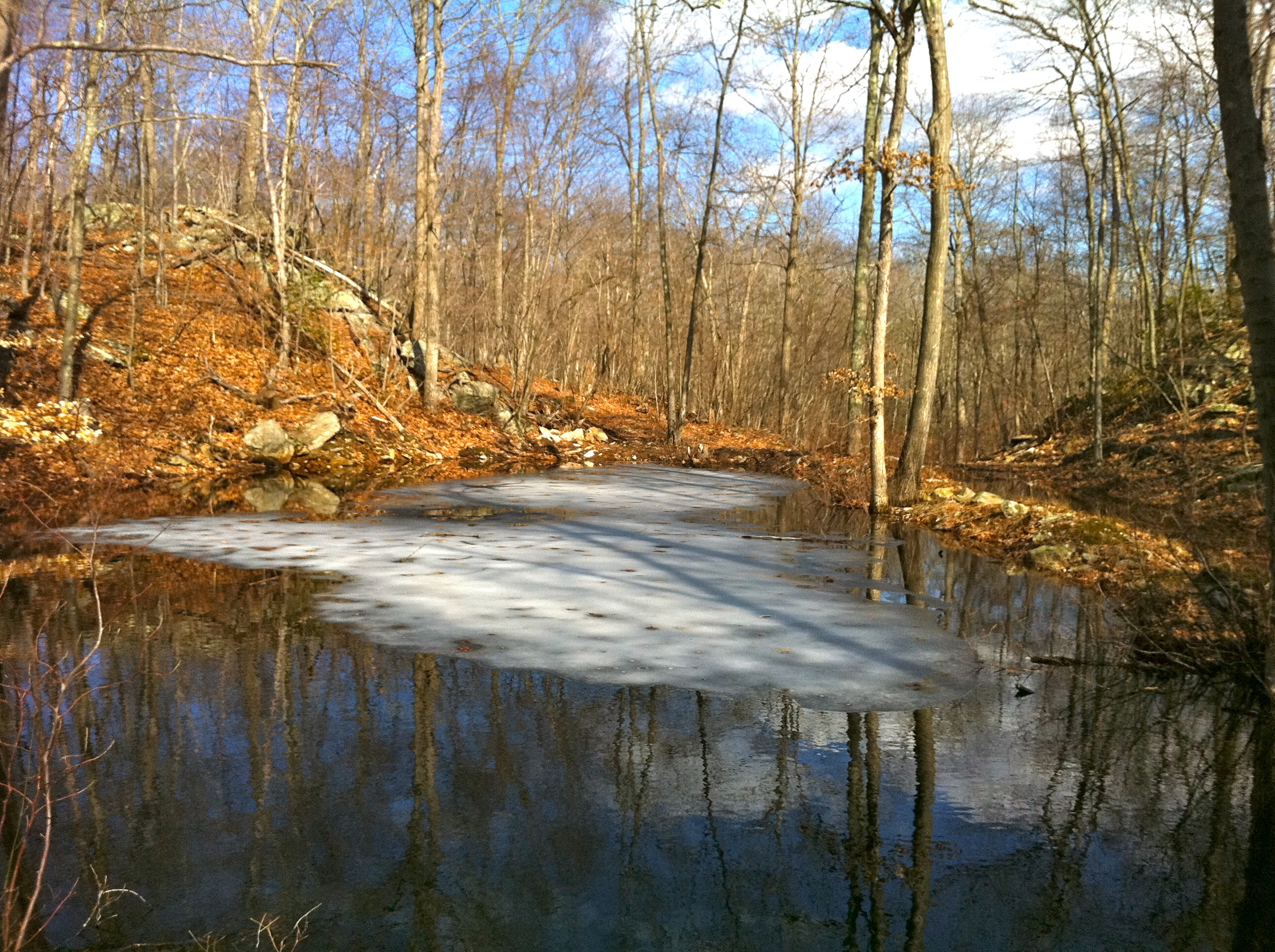
- Partially frozen pond along Pequot Trail.
- Length: 8.0 miles (12.9 km)
- Location: Connecticut
- Designation: CFPA Blue-Blazed Trail
- Use: hiking, cross-country skiing, snowshoeing, other
- Hazards: hunters, deer ticks, poison ivy

The Pequot Trail is a 8.0-mile (12.9 km) Blue-Blazed Trail, a hiking trail maintained by the Connecticut Forest and Park Association.

== Trail description ==
The Pequot Trail extends from its northern terminus on Route 165 in an area known as Hellgate in Preston, and follows a power line south through wetland areas, rocky ridges, and forest roads to Route 2, where it crosses and follows Lincoln Park Road to Lincoln Park. From there it enters a park path to Rose Hill Road, crossing into Ledyard and back onto private land to the top of Rose Hill. There it is on the southern edge of the state-owned Rose Hill Wildlife Management Area until it exits onto Thomas Road eastward to and across Mathewson Mill Road to Fanning Road. Just before the private Mashantucket Pequot Burial Ground it turns south through a wooded area to the southern terminus on Coachman Pike.

The Pequot Trail is primarily used for hiking, backpacking, picnicking, hunting, and, in the winter, snowshoeing.

Portions of the trail are suitable for cross-country skiing, letterboxing, geocaching, and bird watching.

=== Trail route ===
Varied terrain, views, hemlocks, rhododendron, and geologic features add interest along the trail. Plans are underway to lengthen the trail and return the southern terminus to its original location with the Narragansett Trail on Lantern Hill in North Stonington via the Mashantucket Tribal Nation property near the Mashantucket Pequot Museum and Research Center.

Several small streams cut across the trail, eventually flowing into the Thames River.

The trail crosses a state wildlife management area, a town park, utility company property, and private properties.

== History and folklore ==
The Blue-Blazed Pequot Trail was created by the Connecticut Forest and Park Association. Portions of the original trail, particularly the sections between the present southern terminus and Lantern Hill, were used by native Americans for centuries. Some of what happened during the early colonial period and before are explained in displays at the Mashantucket Pequot Museum and may eventually be described in interpretive signage on the trail when sections through the area are opened. Remnants of the original trail still exist as part of a trail system within the MPTN property around Lantern Hill.

The route of the original trail blazed in the 1930s can be seen in the Connecticut Forest and Park Association's 1940 Connecticut Walk Book map of major trails.

=== Origin and name ===
The trail is named for The Mashantucket Pequot Tribe.

=== Historic sites ===
In addition to the Mashantucket Pequot sites, the highest point on the trail, about one mile from the northern end of the trail, is on land once belonging to the Mohegan sachem Uncas. Just north of that location the trail enters a narrow rocky constriction in a woods road. This is the place for which the area received the name Hellgate. There is Hellgate Farm on Miller Road in Preston at the end of this woods road. The other end of the woods road is on Brickyard Road, named for another historic feature of the town.

"Pequot" was also the name of the area of Connecticut around and east of the Thames River and is the original name of the Thames River.

=== Folklore ===
The circumstances surrounding the origin of the name Hellgate, the history of Uncas' connection to the land, the relations between the Mohegans and the Pequots, the brickyard, the original occupants of homes now only showing as foundations or cellar holes, the use and reasons for some odd stone walls at the bottom of a ravine and the occasional "frog war" that happens in the wetland meadow area are all things that can give the casual hiker something to think about on his or her leisurely hike.

== Hiking the trail ==
The trail is blazed with blue rectangles. Trail descriptions are available from a number of commercial and non-commercial sources, and a complete guidebook is published by the Connecticut Forest and Park Association. It is regularly maintained, and is considered easy hiking, with very few sections of rugged or moderately difficult hiking. All of the trail is closed to motor vehicles. There are no camping facilities along the trail, and camping is prohibited in the areas along the trail.

Weather along the route is typical of Connecticut. Conditions on exposed ridge tops and summits may be harsher during cold or stormy weather. Lightning is a hazard on exposed summits and ledges during thunderstorms. Snow is common in the winter and may necessitate the use of snowshoes. Ice can form on exposed ledges and summits, making hiking dangerous without special equipment.

Extensive flooding in ponds, puddles and streams may occur in the late winter or early spring, overflowing into the trail and causing very muddy conditions. In this case fairly high waterproof boots are recommended. Some parts of the trail follow forest roads which often contain ruts from ATVs and four-wheel drive vehicles.

Biting insects can be bothersome during warm weather. Parasitic deer ticks (which are known to carry Lyme disease) are a potential hazard.

Almost all of the trail is adjacent to, or is on lands where hunting and the use of firearms are permitted. Wearing bright orange clothing during the hunting season (Fall through December) is recommended.

== See also ==
- Blue-Blazed Trails
