= Narragansett Trail =

Public footpath in Connecticut, US

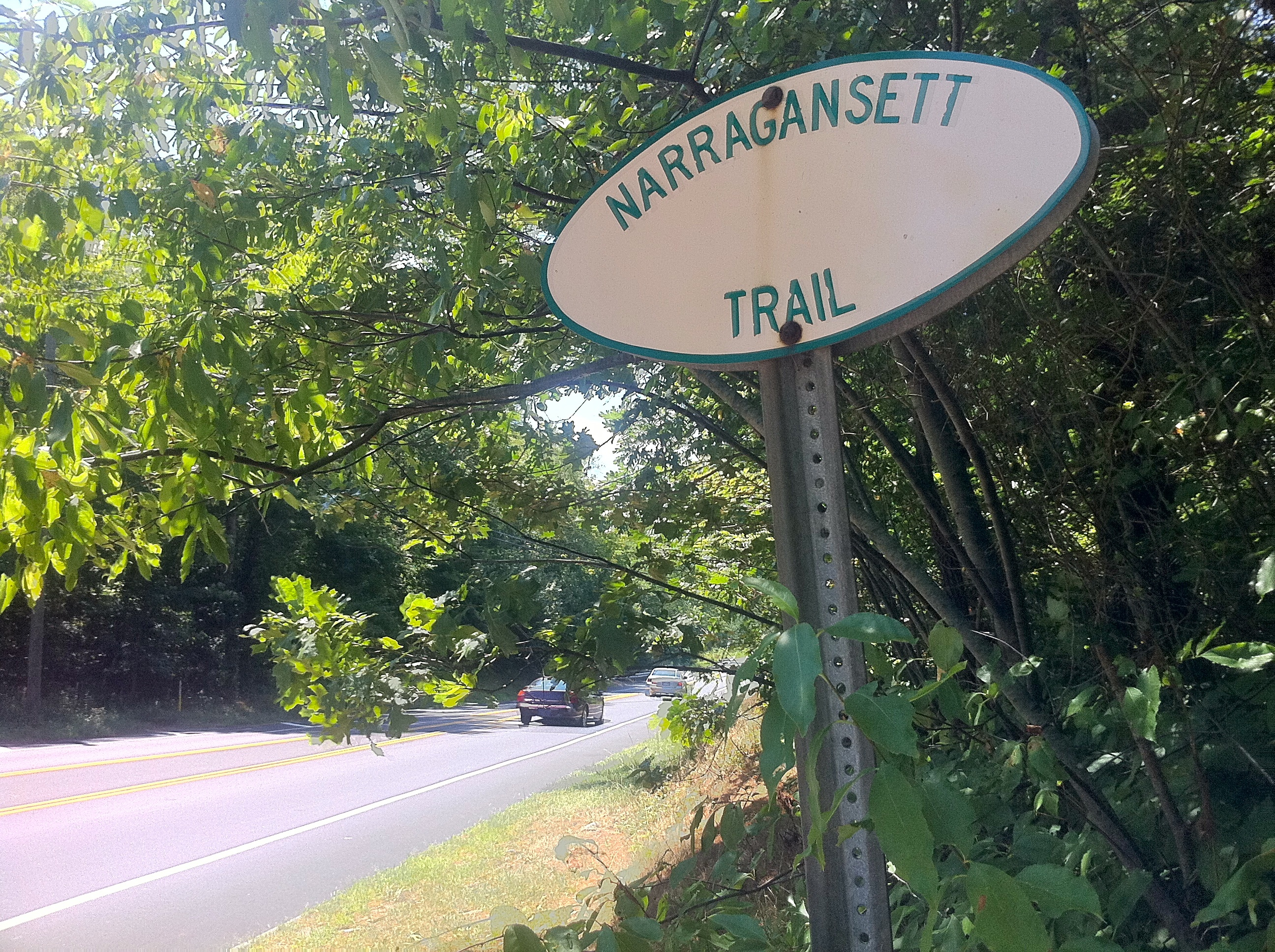
- Narragansett Trail "white oval" sign at junction of Connecticut State Route 2 and Ryder Road.
- Length: 16 miles (26 km)
- Location: Connecticut
- Designation: CFPA Blue-Blazed Trail
- Use: Hiking, running, cross-country skiing, snowshoeing
- Highest point: Lantern Hill; 41.4608°N 71.9441°W, 490 ft (150 m)
- Lowest point: Lantern Hill Pond, 115 ft (35 m)
- Sights: Lantern Hill, High Ledge, Wyassup Lake, Green Falls Pond, CT/RI Border Marker
- Hazards: Hunters, deer ticks, poison ivy, insects, snakes, black bears

The Narragansett Trail is a 16 miles (26 km) hiking trail located in Connecticut. It is one of the Blue-Blazed Trails maintained by the Connecticut Forest and Park Association, the Narragansett Council, and the Rhode Island chapter of Scouts BSA.

Running along the Connecticut-Rhode Island border, the trail passes through the towns of Ledyard, Voluntown, and North Stonington in eastern Connecticut, as well as the Lantern Hill section of the Mashantucket Pequot Reservation, the Groton Sportsman Club, the Nature Conservancy's Gladys Foster Preserve, the Pachaug State Forest Green Falls Pond area, and the Rhode Island Scouts BSA Narragansett Council Camp Yawgoog reservation property.

The Narragansett Trail follows a primarily southwest-to-northeast trail for approximately 15.5 miles (24.9 km). At the easternmost end, the trail becomes a north-to-south trail section that strictly follows the Connecticut/Rhode Island border south for 0.5 miles (0.80 km). Notable features include the summits of Lantern Hill and High Ledge. The trail also goes near but does not summit Cossaduck Hill and Pendleton Hill.

== Trail description ==
The Narragansett Trail is a Blue-Blazed Hiking Trail and extends from Wintechog Road near the intersection with Connecticut Route 2 in Ledyard, Connecticut, to Green Fall Road in North Stonington at the Connecticut-Rhode Island state line. Much of the Narragansett Trail is on state land within the Pachaug State Forest. The Narragansett Trail connects to public recreation areas maintained by the Connecticut Department of Environmental Protection at Green Falls Pond and Wyassup Lake in Pachaug State Forest.

Much of the Narragansett Trail is flat or has gradual ascents and descents, making it suitable for casual walking or hiking, running, or snowshoeing in the winter. The trail's highest uphill grade comes when it crosses a closed section of Flat Rock Road. The Narragansett Trail crosses streams and wetland areas that are subject to flooding in periods of significant rain and snow melt. Trail sections in low-lying areas close to Hell Hollow Pond and Lockes Meadow Pond are the most frequently flooded.

The trail connects to two other Blue-Blazed Hiking Trails via the Green Falls Pond Loop connector trail: the Nehantic Trail and Pachaug Trail in Connecticut's Pachaug State Forest. The Green Falls Pond Loop Trail and Narragansett Trail overlap around the southern and eastern shores of Green Falls Pond.

The Narragansett Trail connects to several other trails outside the "Blue-Blazed" system, including sections of the Lantern Hill trail in the west and several unnamed trails along its route. The Tippecansett Trail connects to the Narragansett Trail at the Connecticut/Rhode Island state border.

=== Trail route ===
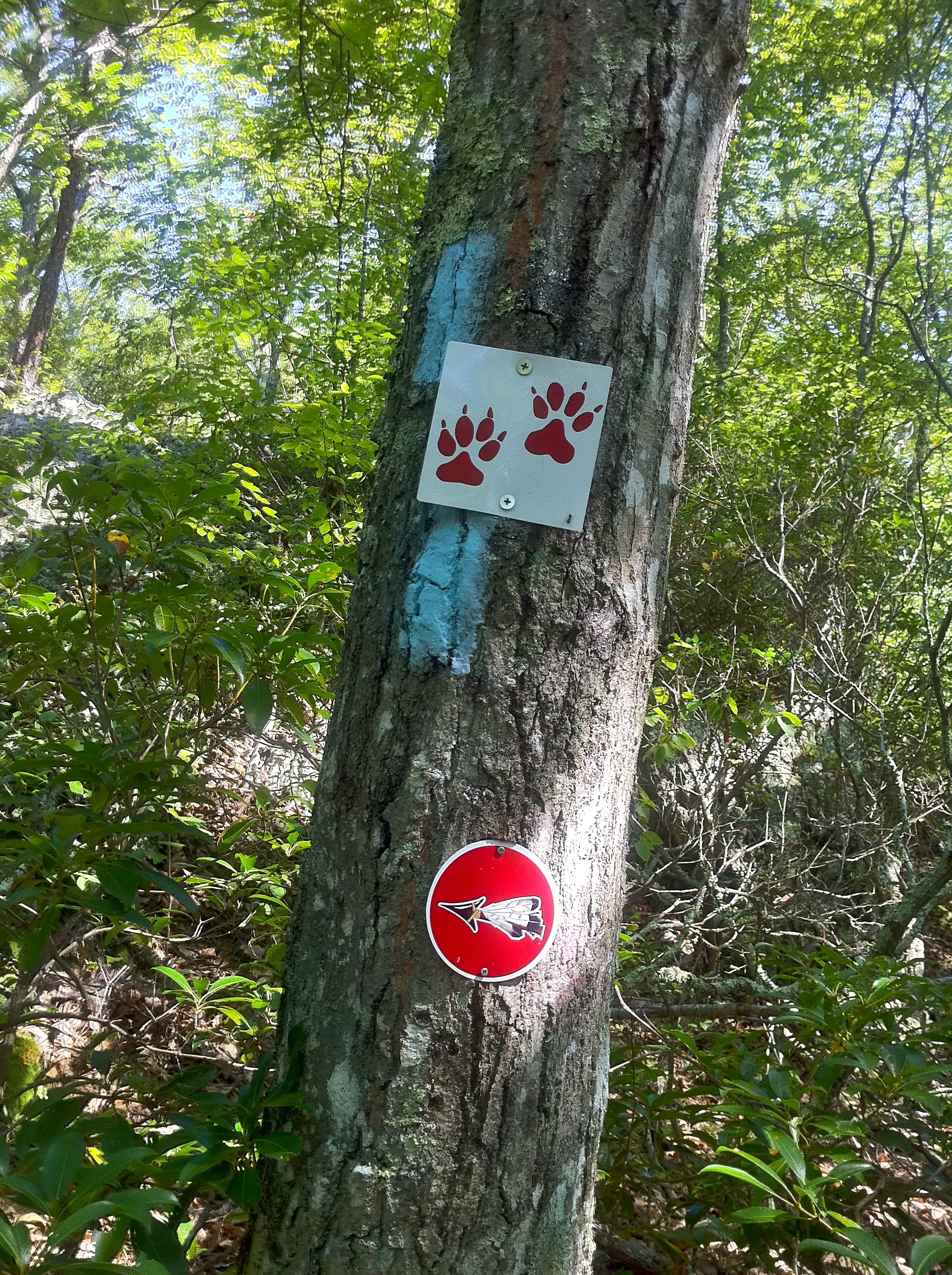
Narragansett Trail blazes with Lantern Hill and Loop Trail signs.

The western end of the Narragansett Trail starts on Wintechog Road in North Stonington, Connecticut, to the southeast of the Mashantucket Pequot Tribe's Foxwoods Casino in Ledyard, Connecticut. The trail climbs southward, connecting with the Lantern Hill trail and Lantern Hill Loop trail. After climbing to the Lantern Hill summit, the trail descends to the west and heads north-west. It passes through the North Stonington dog pound and waste transfer station property before crossing Wintechog Road. The trail continues north through woods and eventually passes through two open fields. After the Gallup Pond dam bridge, the trail crosses Connecticut Route 2. There is a short road walk up and down Ryder Road to the trail entrance at the Nature Conservancy's Gladys Foster parcel. The trail continues to Yawbux Brook and an unnamed beaver pond before entering Pachaug State Forest. The trail then joins Wyassup Lake Road at the Lake Wyassup boat launch. From the Lake Wyassup boat launch, the trail climbs to the High Ledge plateau and then to the Legend Woods/Pendleton Hill area before crossing Connecticut Route 49.

Next, the trail travels north-east through the private hunting and fishing preserve of the Groton Sportsmen Club (this Narragansett Trail section is closed from October to March according to posted signs), re-enters the Pachaug State Forest at Tom Wheeler Road and follows the Green Fall River (and ravine) north to Green Fall Pond. The trail follows the southeast shore of the pond before leaving the shore of the pond to head east to the Rhode Island border. At the border, the trail turns 90 degrees to head south over a rock ridge housing a cave. After 0.5 miles (0.80 km), the trail's Connecticut section ends at a small parking lot and state line marker where Green Fall Road becomes Yawgoog Road in Rhode Island.

There is a 4 miles (6.4 km) long extension of the trail into Rhode Island, which is blazed yellow. This Narragansett Trail extension passes by the Long and Ell Ponds and through the Rockville Wildlife Management Area before ending at Ashville Pond in Hopkinton, Rhode Island. The Narragansett Trail used to continue to Rhode Island Route 138 in Kingston, Rhode Island.

== Landscape and wildlife ==
The landscape in the area is generally low-lying and flat, with some rolling hills. The most prominent features are Lantern Hill and the High Ledge plateau, rocks, and small caves.

Numerous vultures and ravens can be spotted flying around the summit of Lantern Hill, and black bear sightings have been reported in the Pachaug State Forest area near the state border. Large horseflies and other biting insects are common in the spring and summer.

The Pachaug State Forest Green Falls Pond area features mature growths of hardwood and evergreens. Swampy areas of the forest include plants such as Mountain Laurel and Rhododendron.

== History and folklore ==
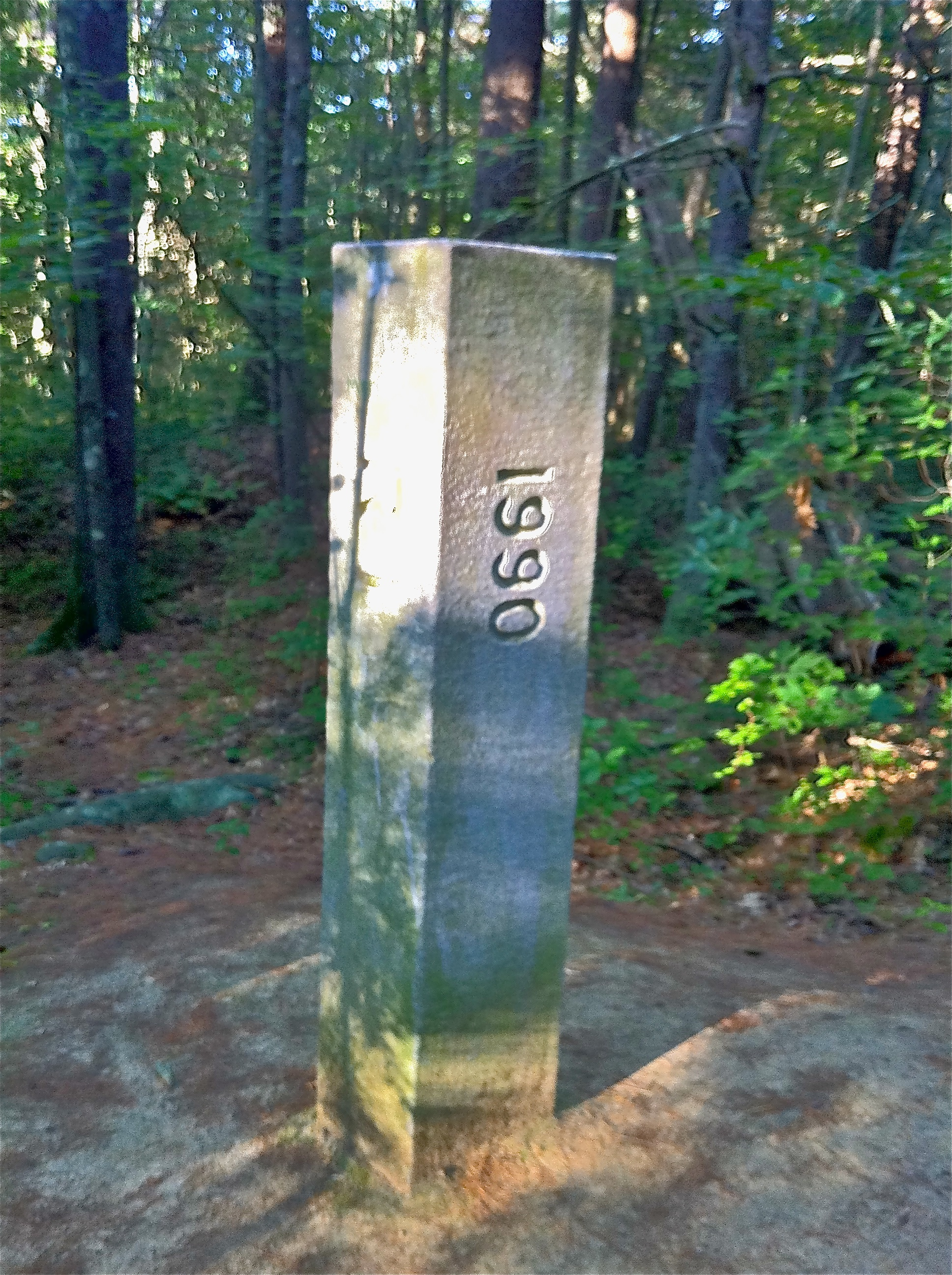
Narragansett Trail Eastern Terminus - Connecticut - Rhode Island State Line Marker on Green Fall Road.

The Blue-Blazed Narragansett Trail was created by the Connecticut Forest and Park Association as part of the Blue-Blazed Hiking Trail system. The eastern end of the Pequot Trail connects to the western end of the Narragansett Trail at the Lantern Hill section of the Mashantucket Pequot reservation. The original connection of these two trails can be seen in the Connecticut Forest and Park Association 1940 Connecticut Walk Book map of major trails. Sections of the trail are on Mashantucket Pequot Tribal Nation property and have been used for centuries by the Pequot tribe. Plans are underway to lengthen the Pequot Trail and return the southeastern terminus to its original location with the Narragansett Trail on Lantern Hill in North Stonington via the Mashantucket Pequot Tribal Nation property.

=== Origin and name ===
Many of the Blue-Blazed Hiking Trails are named after local Native American tribes, people, and place names. many of the trails follow historic footpaths.

The name of the trail itself, Narragansett, is a tribe of Algonquian-speaking people who live in present-day western Rhode Island, including the coast and islands in Narragansett Bay. Members of the recognized tribe continue to live in areas of eastern Connecticut near the current border with Rhode Island.

The word "Narragansett" means "People of the Small Point". See Narragansett name and language.

=== Historic sites ===
The land making up Pachaug State Forest was settled by the English in the early 1700's after King Phillip's War or the Narragansett War. These settlers cleared the valley of trees for settlement, the whole of the forest being farmed or ranched. Pachaug State Forest was created through various land purchases by the Connecticut government during the New Deal. Farms and settlements were abandoned, leading to extensive second-growth forest. Ruins from the 20th century can be found along the route. Stone foundations and extensive stone walls can be found off of the trail east of High Ledge in the Legend Woods area.

== Hiking the trail ==
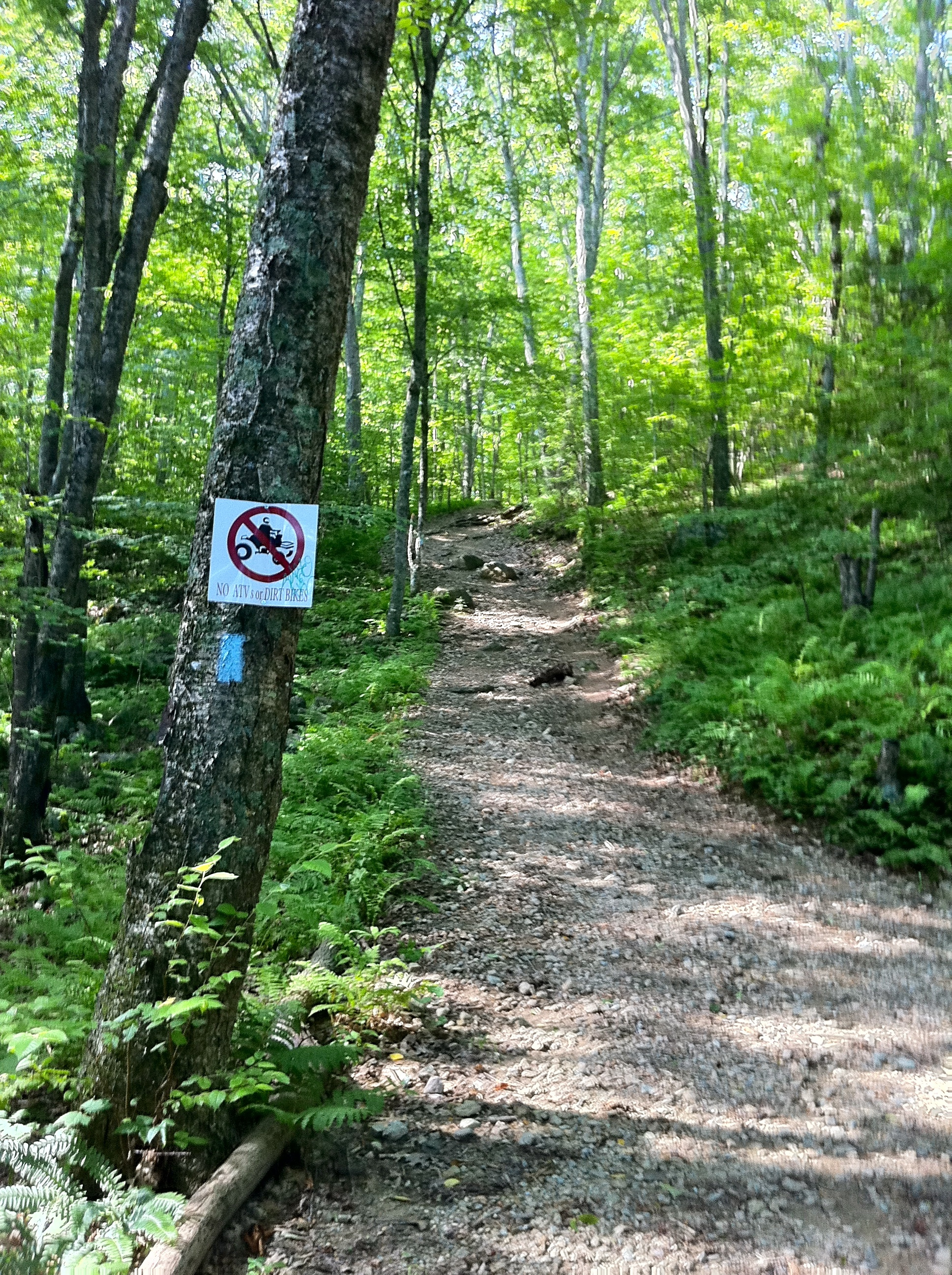
Narragansett Trail's south-west trailhead at Wintechog Road.

The Weather along the route is typical of Connecticut. Conditions on exposed ridge tops and summits may be harsher during cold or stormy weather. Lightning is a hazard on exposed summits and ledges during thunderstorms. Snow and ice formations along exposed ledges and summits are common in the winter and may necessitate the use of snowshoes and special equipment.

Hiking through property owned by Groton Rod and Gun Club, the trail that runs between Route 49 and Tom Wheeler Rd., is prohibited. This section can be avoided by walking Pendleton Hill Road to Sand Hill Road, then up Tom Wheeler to rejoin the trail.

Biting insects such as parasitic deer ticks (which are known to carry Lyme disease) are a potential hazard, as are encounters with small wildlife.

Caution is advised during permitted seasonal hunting on state forest land.

A guidebook on the trail as well as updates on trail conditions, closures, and restrictions can be found on the Connecticut Forest and Park Association website. Contact information is also available on the site for trail users to report adverse trail conditions or submit other feedback and questions.

== Conservation and maintenance of the trail corridor ==
Much of the trail is flooded or muddy. There are sections filled with stones and other evidence of erosion that has occurred when the trail turns into a temporary stream.

All-terrain vehicles, dirt bikes, and horses are common on the trail. Some sections of the Narragansett trail are explicitly multi-use, but there is often unauthorized vehicular and equestrian use.

One example of a mixed-use section is the 58 miles (93 km) Enduro Trail in Pachaug State Forest. It was marked with white labels containing a red arrow, pointing in the trail's direction. The route follows a mix of forest trails and public roads.

== Recognition/inspiration programs ==
There is a State of Connecticut Department of Environmental Protection letterbox hidden close to the trail on the High Ledge plateau.

== Image gallery ==
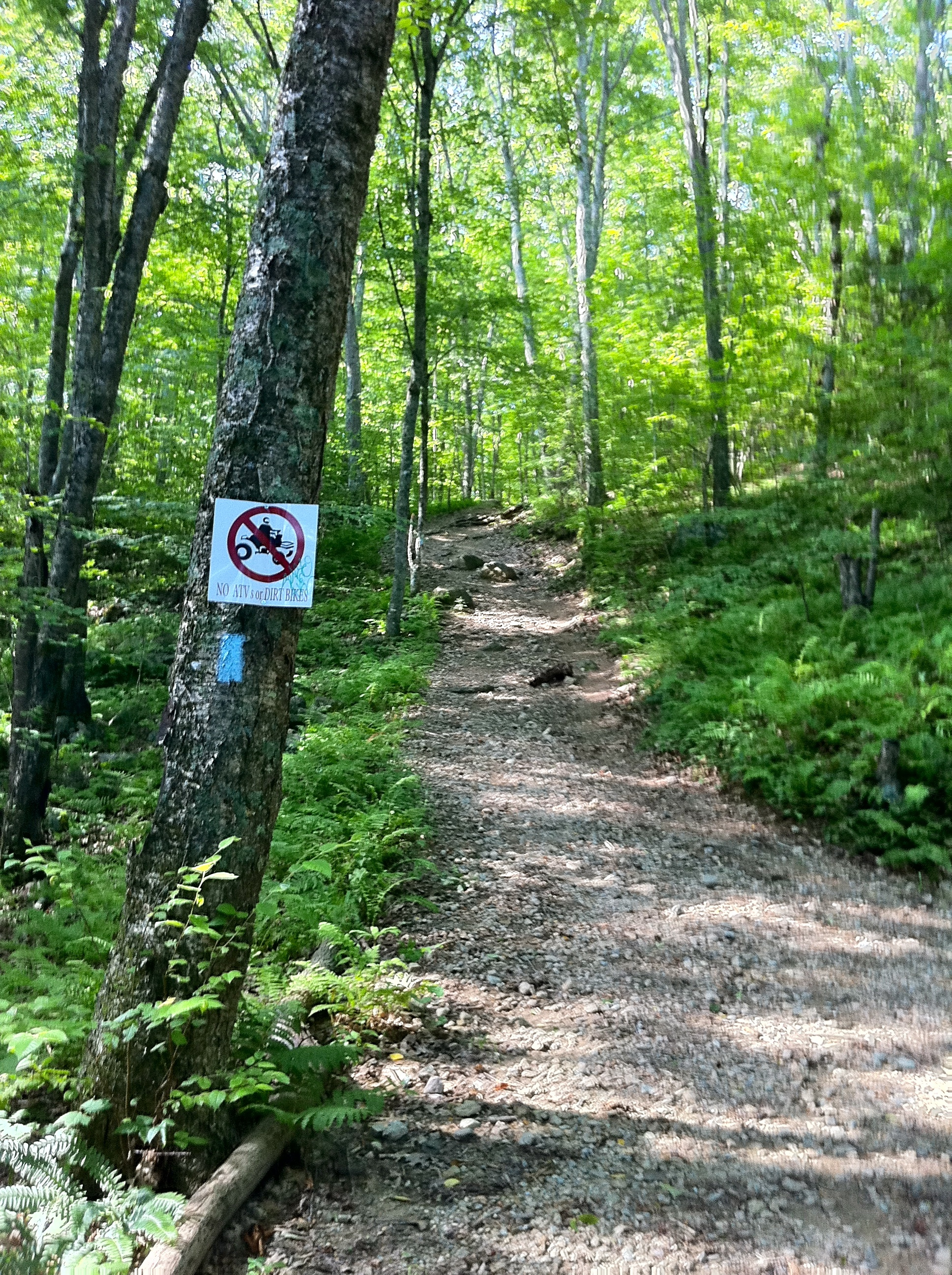
Narragansett Trail's south-west trailhead at Wintechog Road.

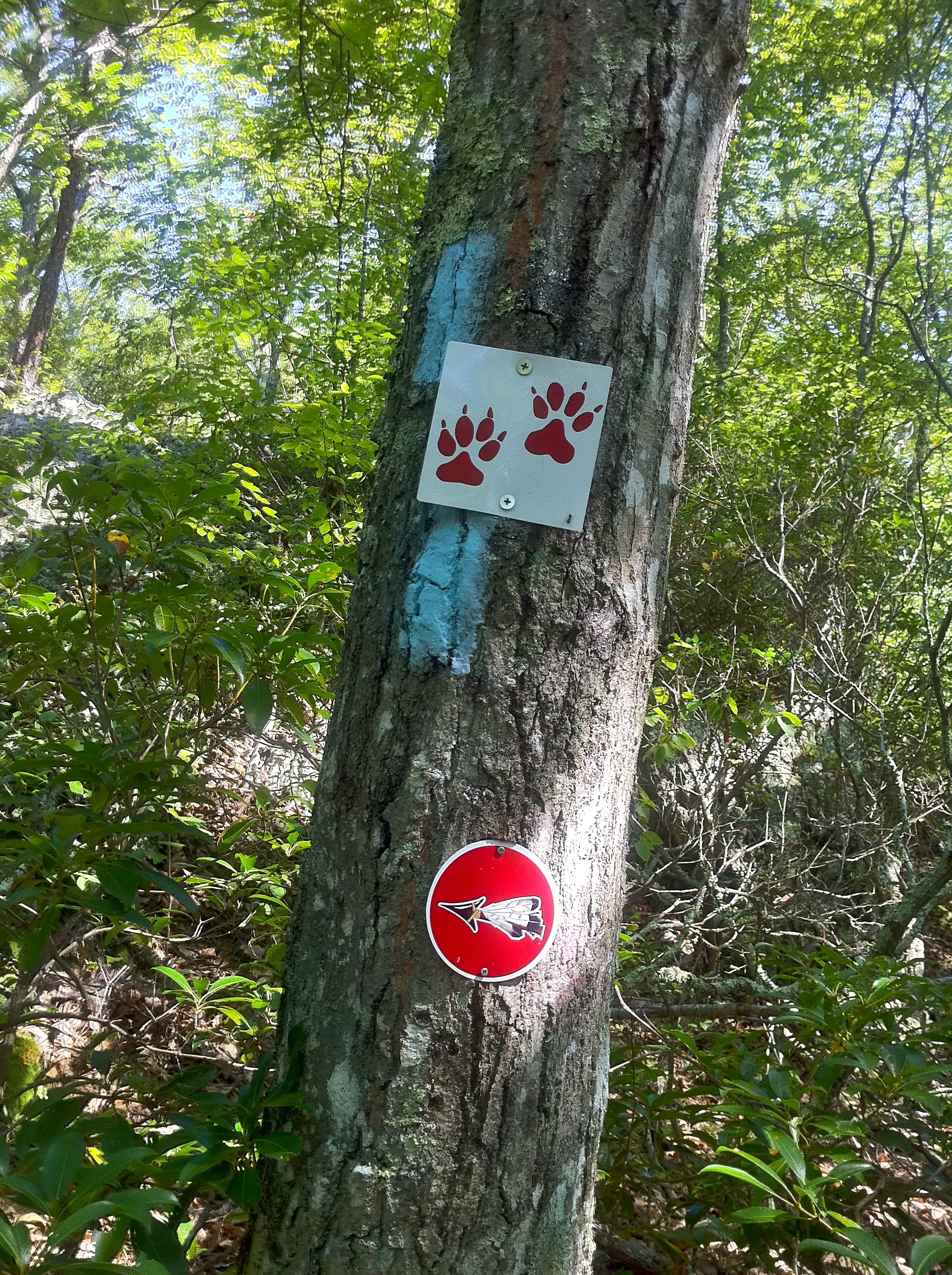
Narragansett Trail blazes with Lantern Hill and Loop Trail signs.

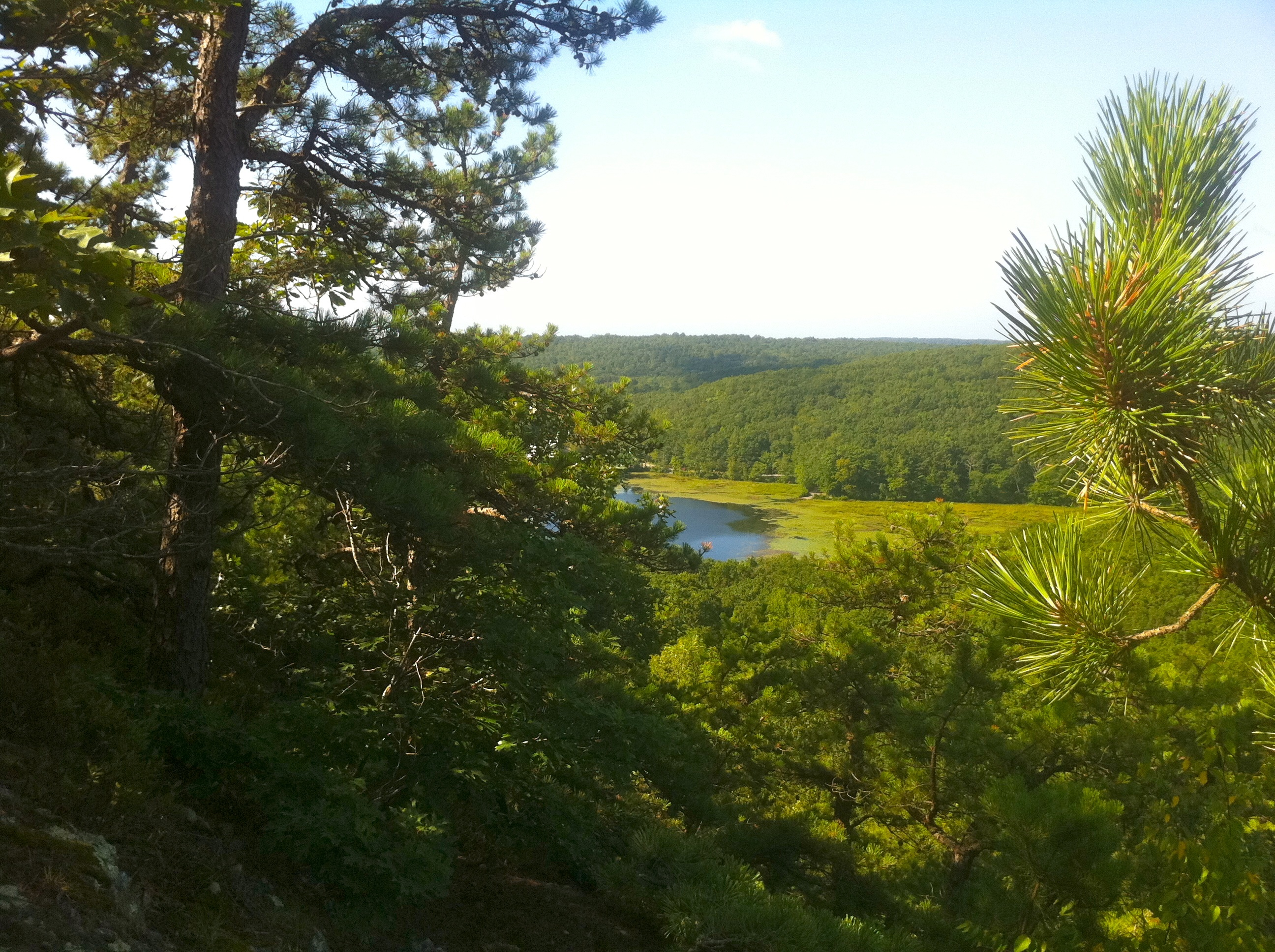
Narragansett Trail's Lantern Hill view of Lantern Hill Pond.

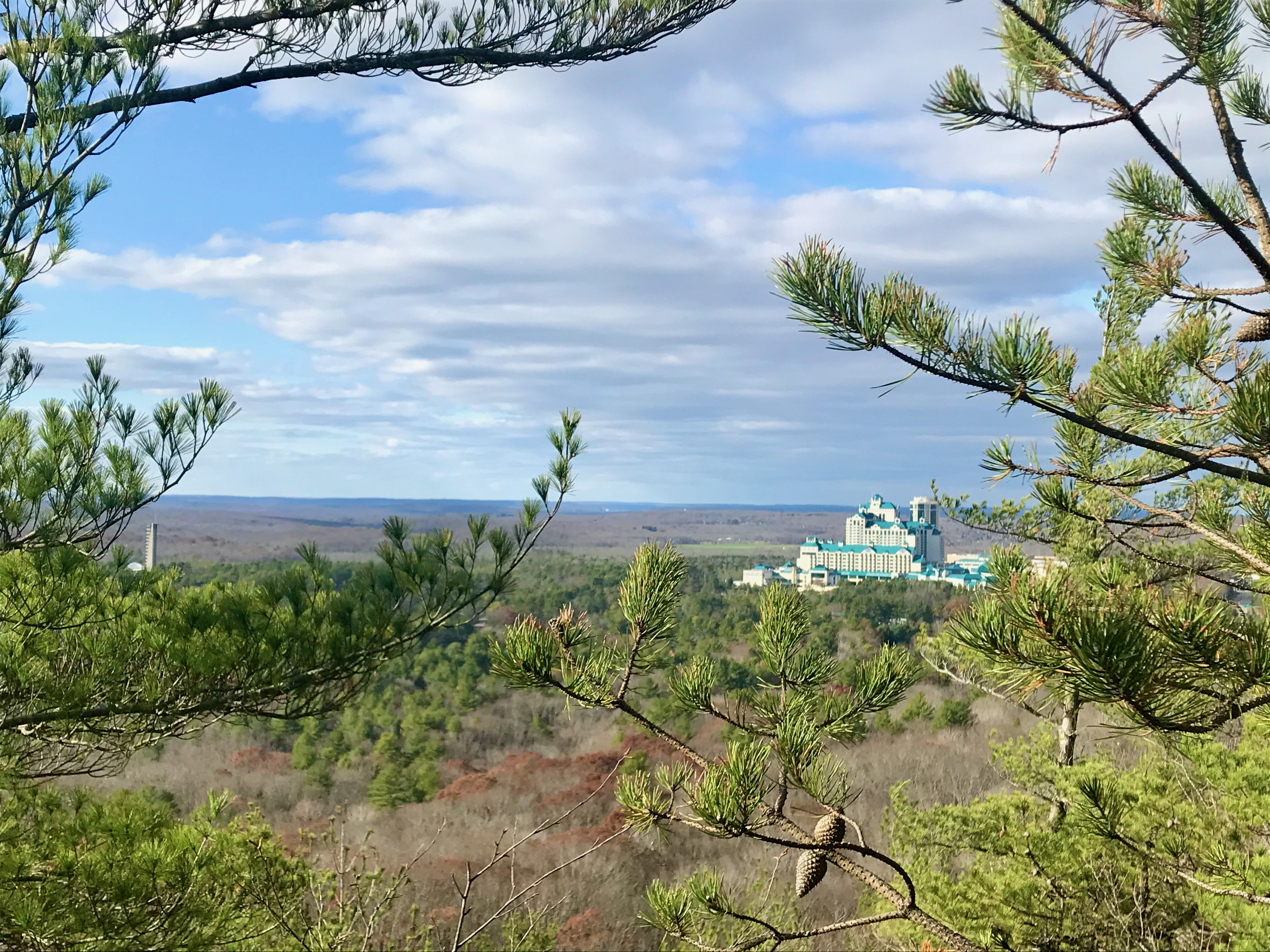
Narragansett Trail's Lantern Hill view of the Mashantucket Pequots Foxwoods Casino Resort.

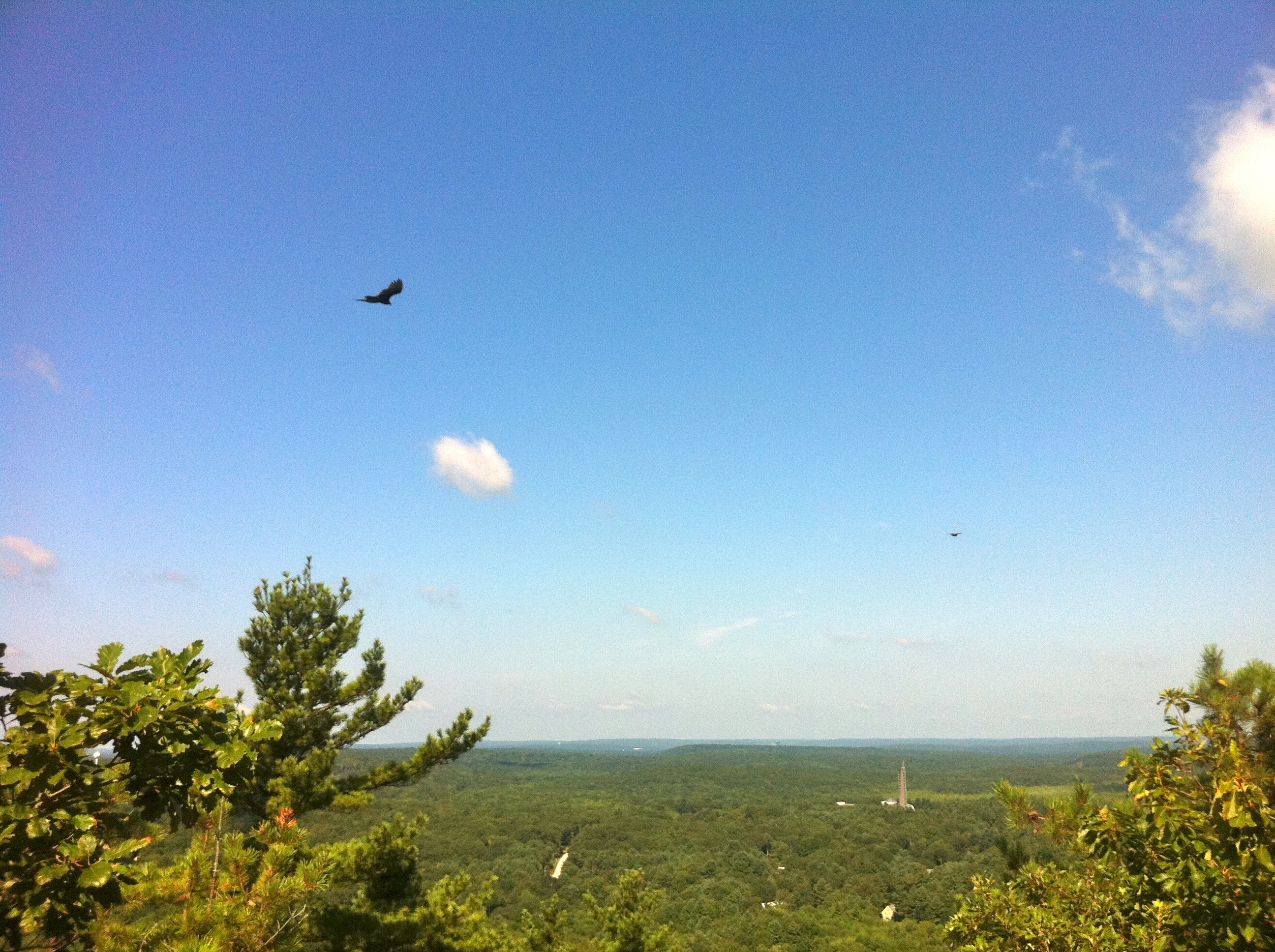
Narragansett Trail's Lantern Hill view of hawks flying. Mashantucket Pequot Museum can be seen in the far background.

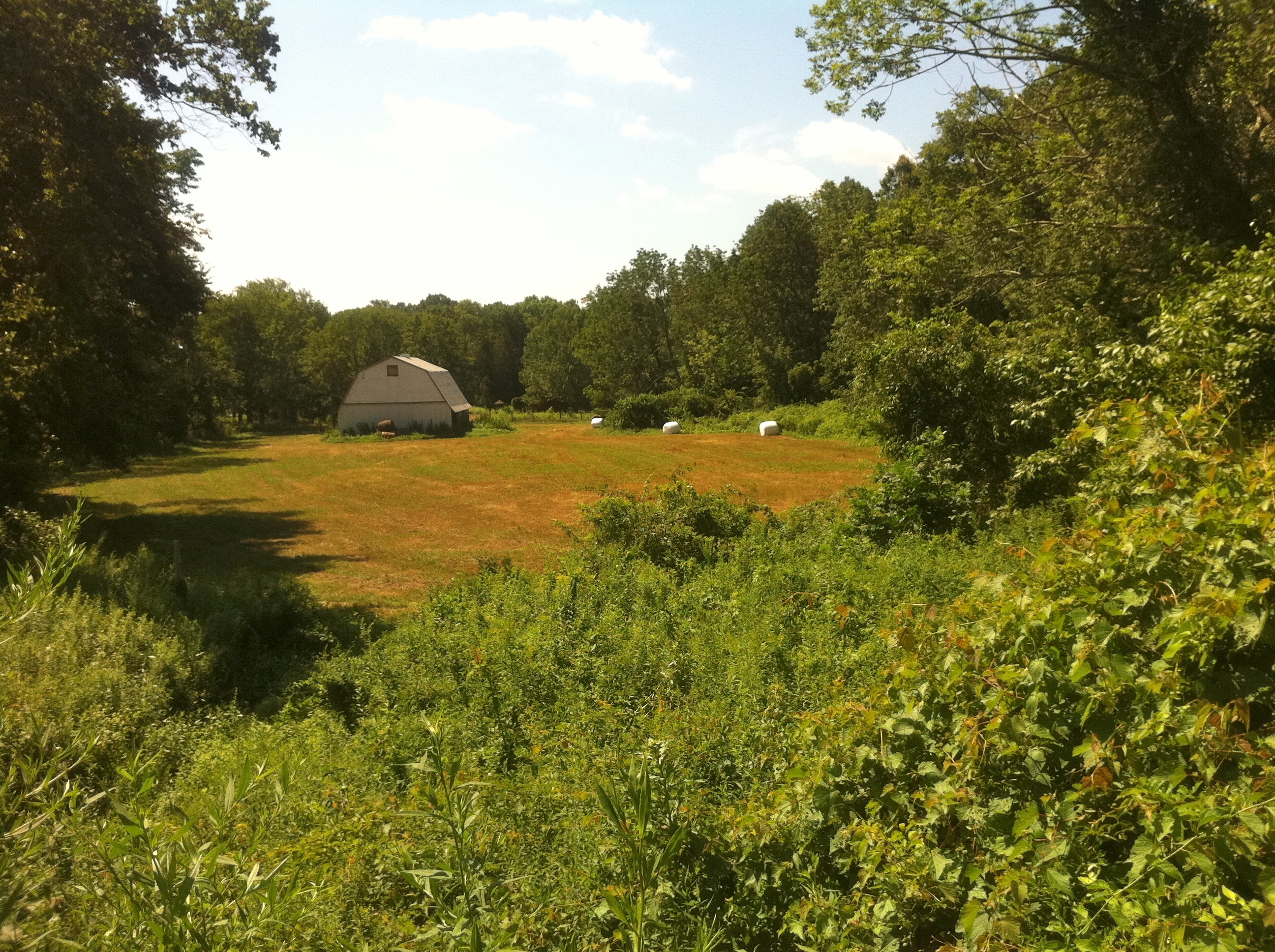
Narragansett Trail - "Shelter Cave Field" meadow with barn adjacent to "Trolley Pasture" meadow.

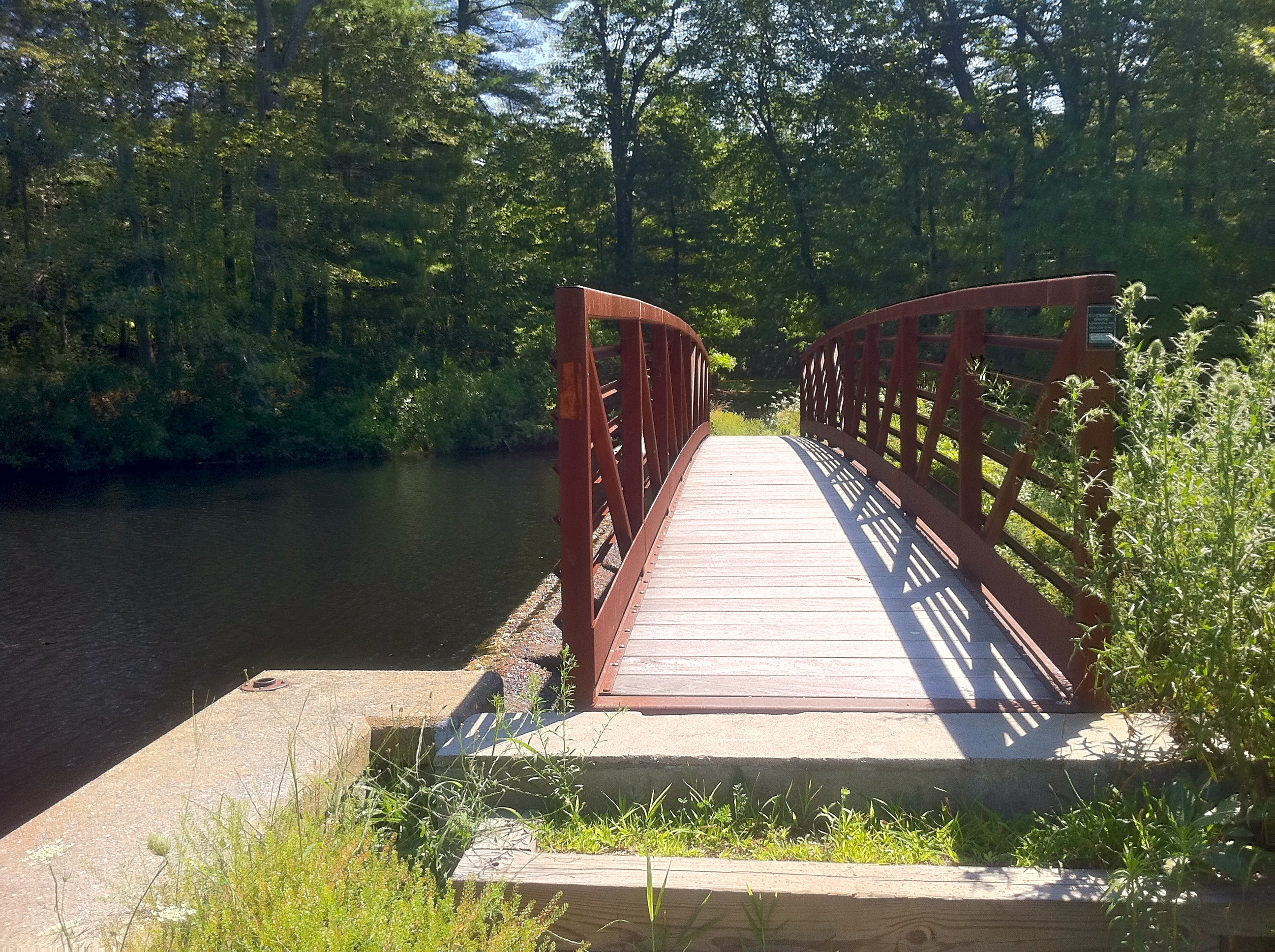
Narragansett Trail - Foot Bridge at Gallup (AKA Hewitt) Pond.

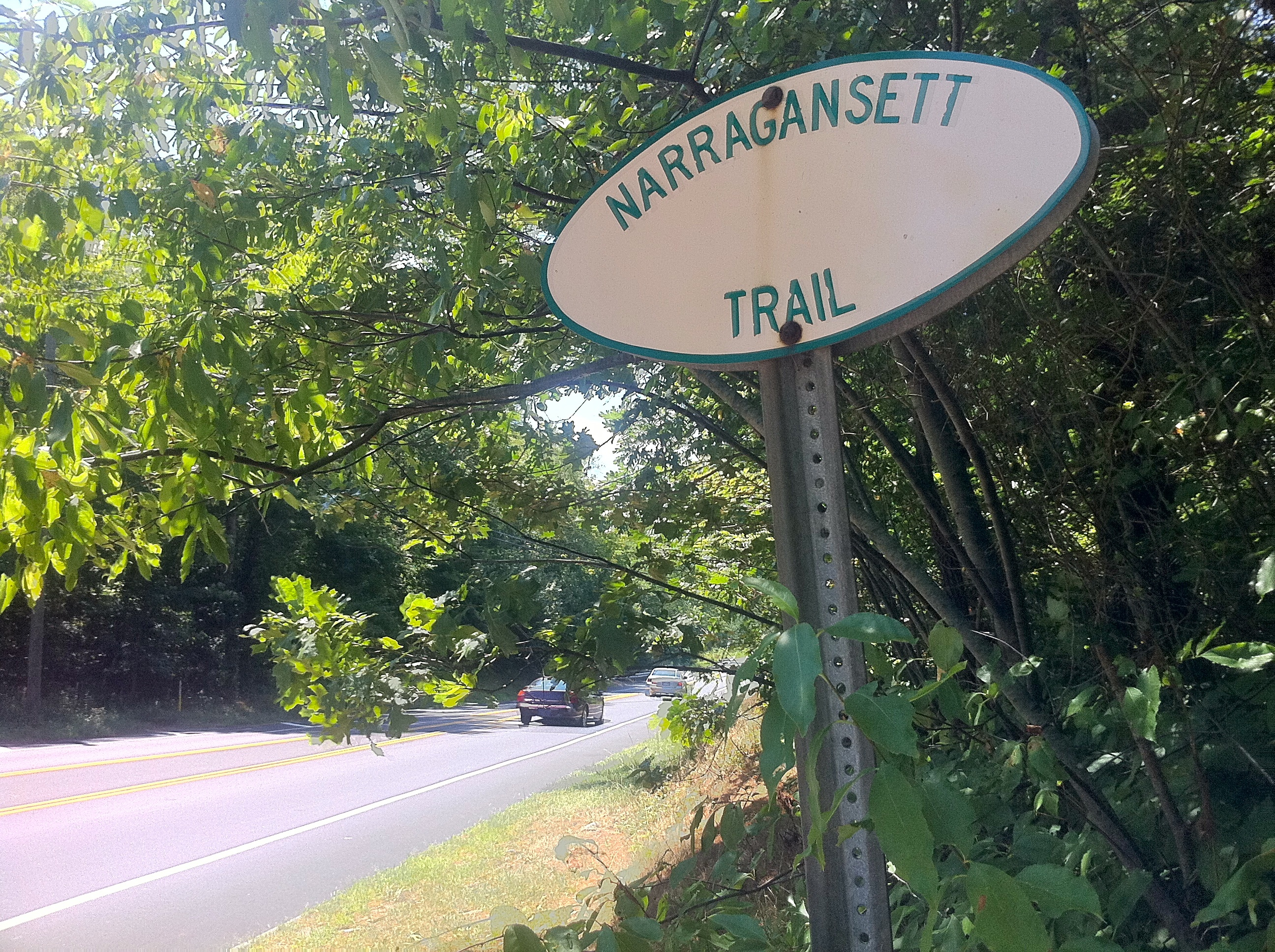
Narragansett Trail "white oval" sign on CT Route 2 near Gallup Pond and Ryder Road.

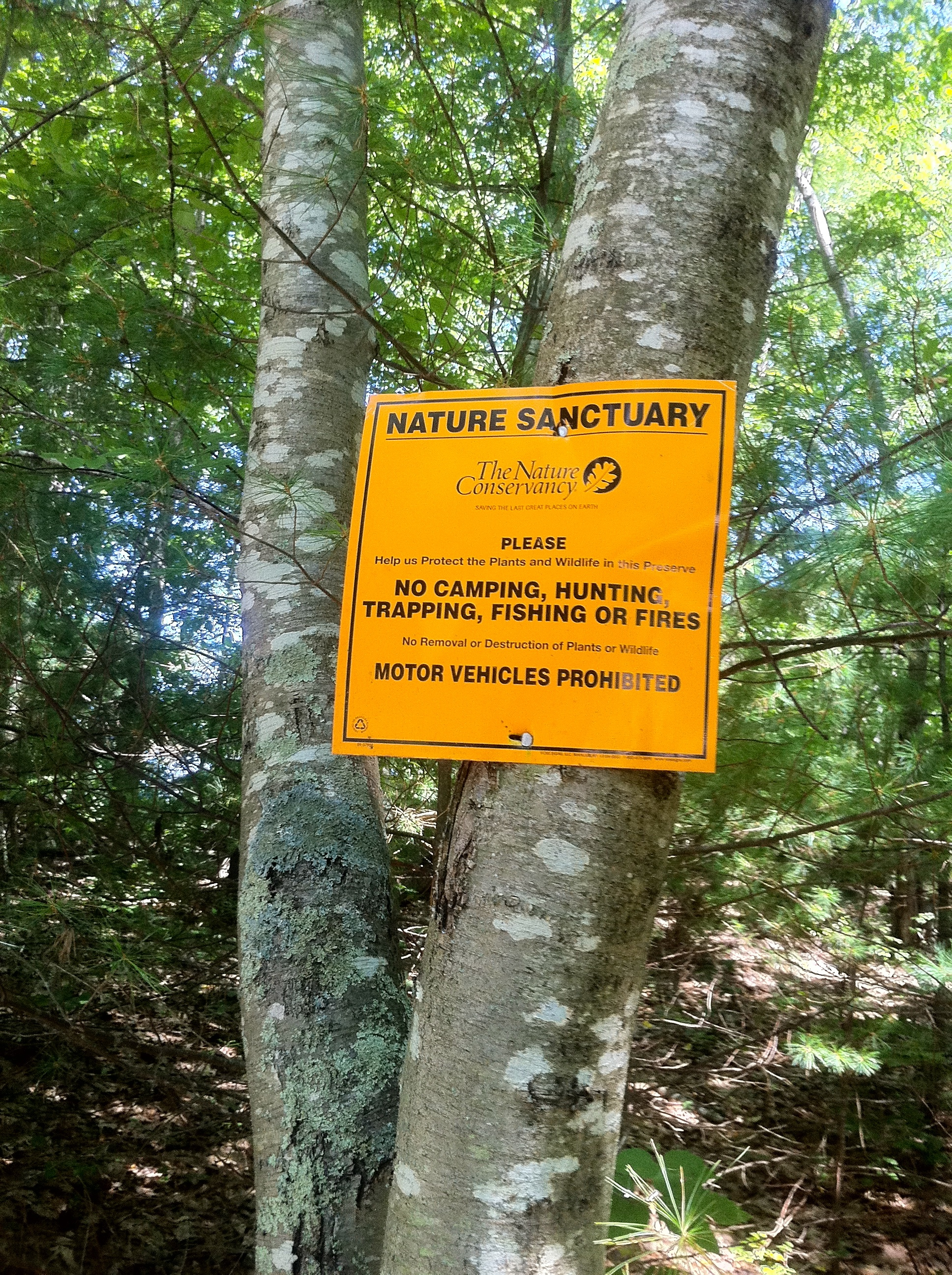
Narragansett Trail - entering the Nature Conservancy's Gladys Foster Preserve in the North Stonington section on Ryder Road.

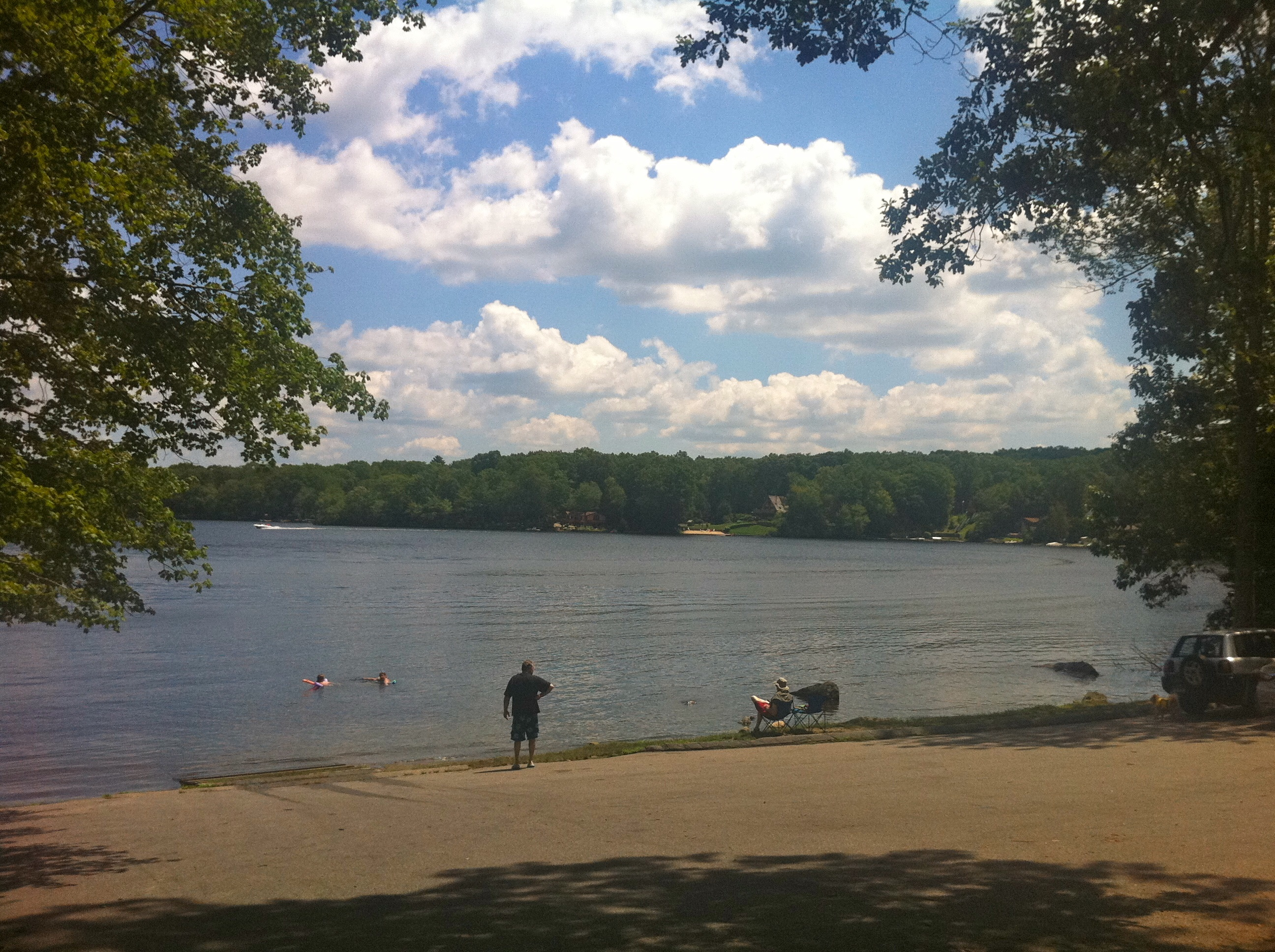
Narragansett Trail - Wyassup Lake boat launch and public access lot on Wyassup Lake Road.

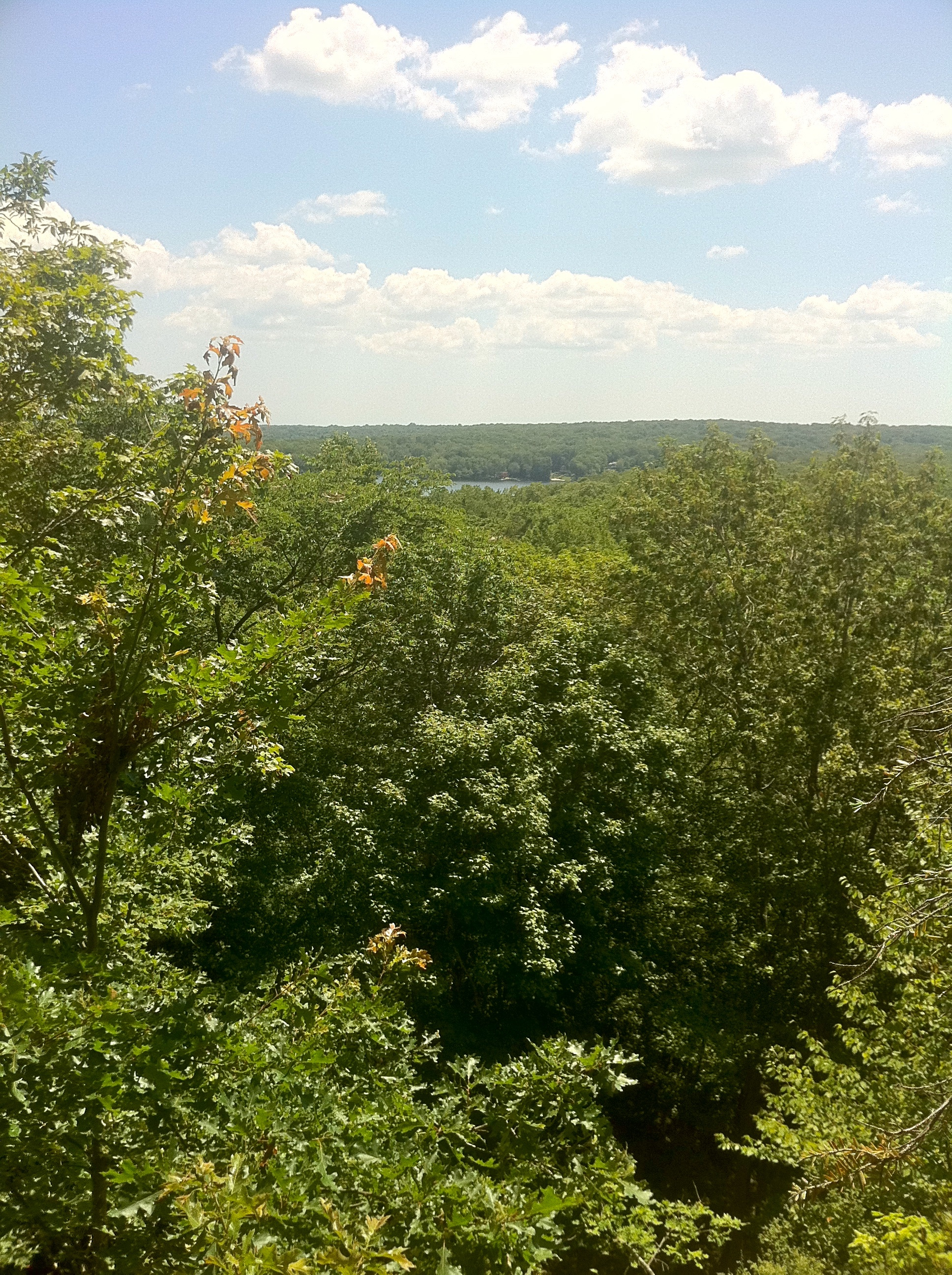
Narragansett Trail - View of Wyassup Lake from High Ledge.

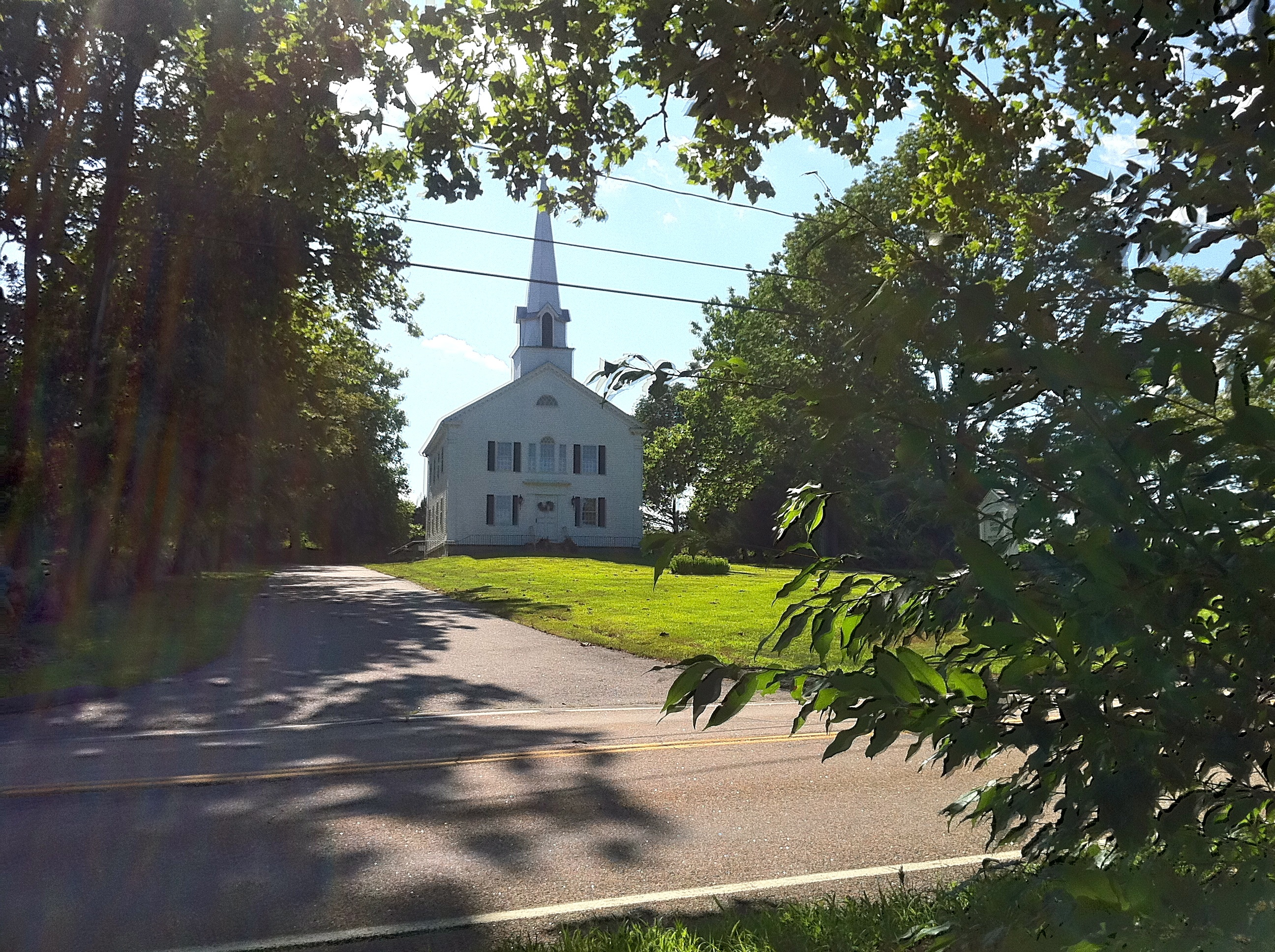
Narragansett Trail - First Baptist Church on Pendleton Hill (opposite Groton Sportsman Club preserve).

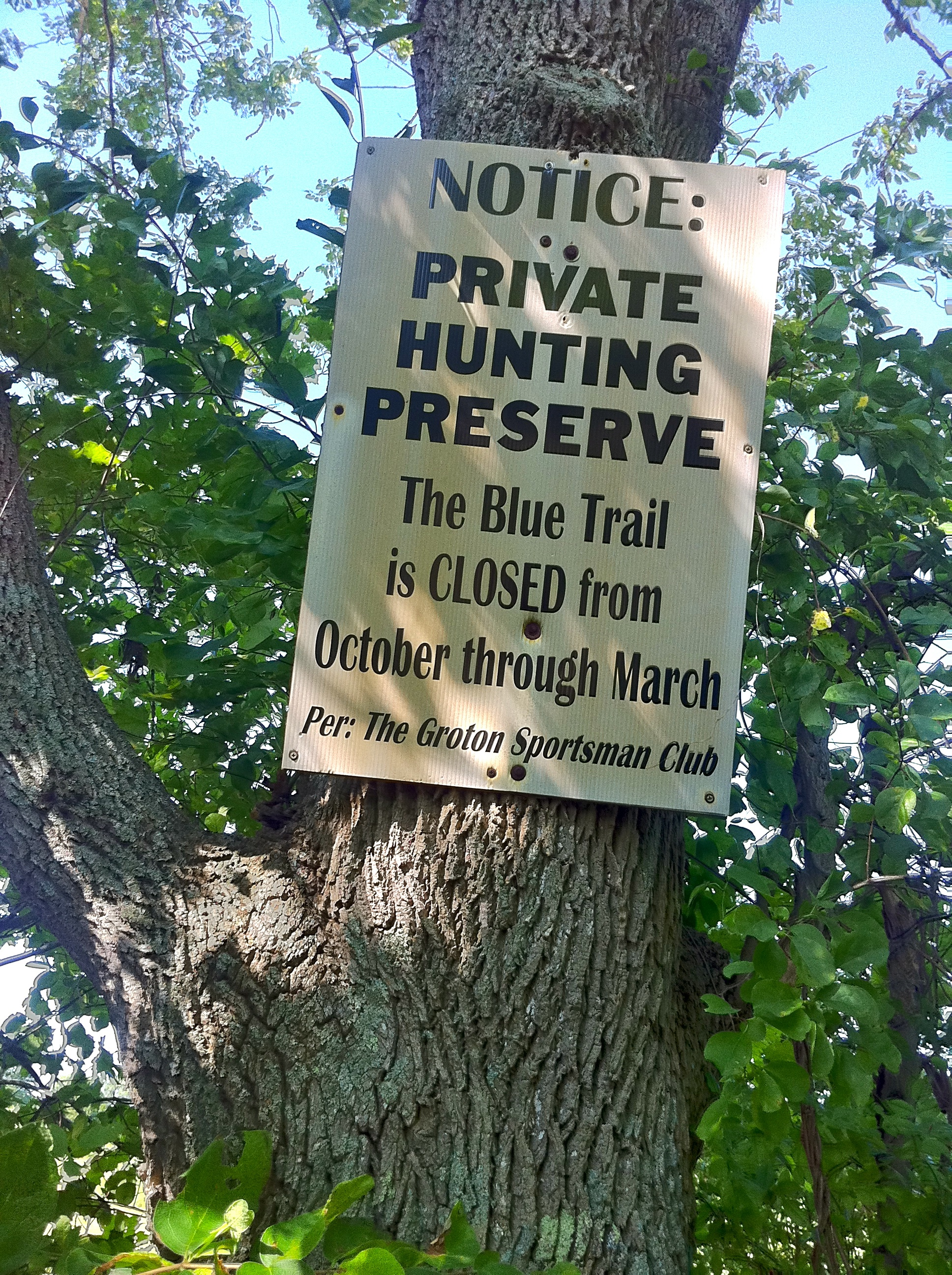
Narragansett Trail - Groton Sportsman Club Private Hunting Preserve hunting season trail closing sign at CT-49 (Pendleton High Rd) entrance.

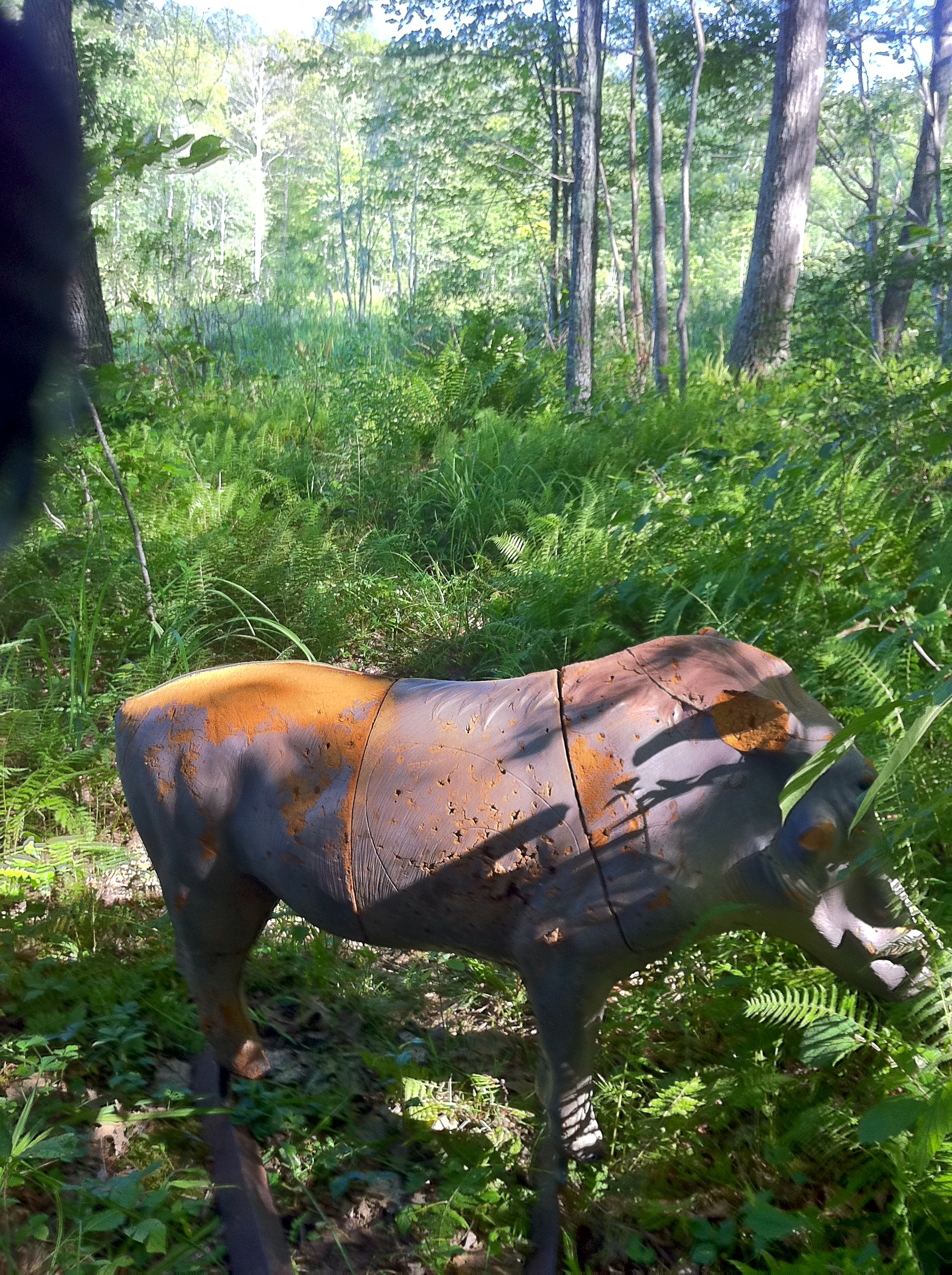
Narragansett Trail - Groton Sportsman Club Private Hunting Preserve 3D target near the fishing pond.

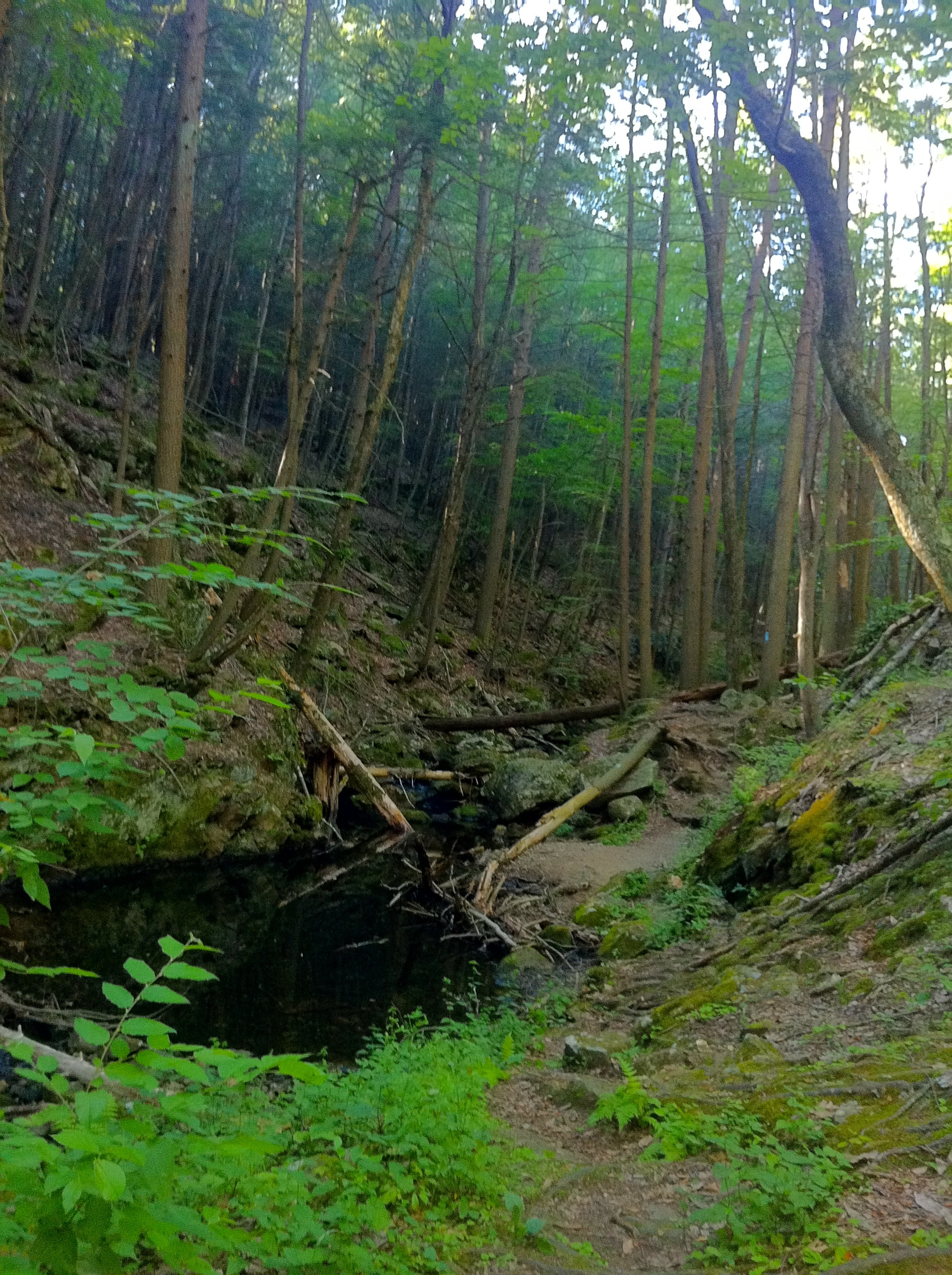
Narragansett Trail - Green Fall River ravine south of Green Fall Pond.

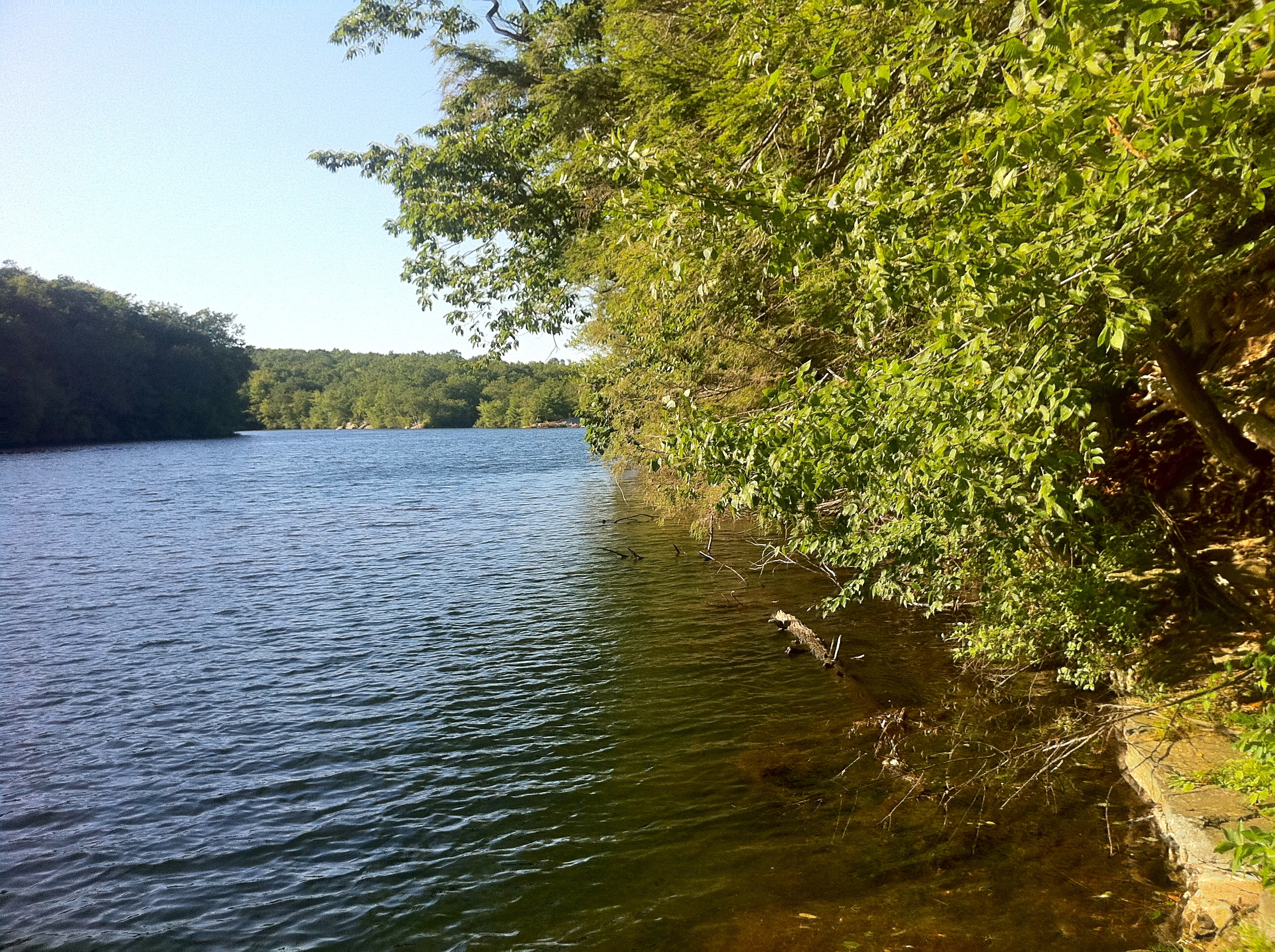
Narragansett Trail - south end of Green Fall Pond looking north.

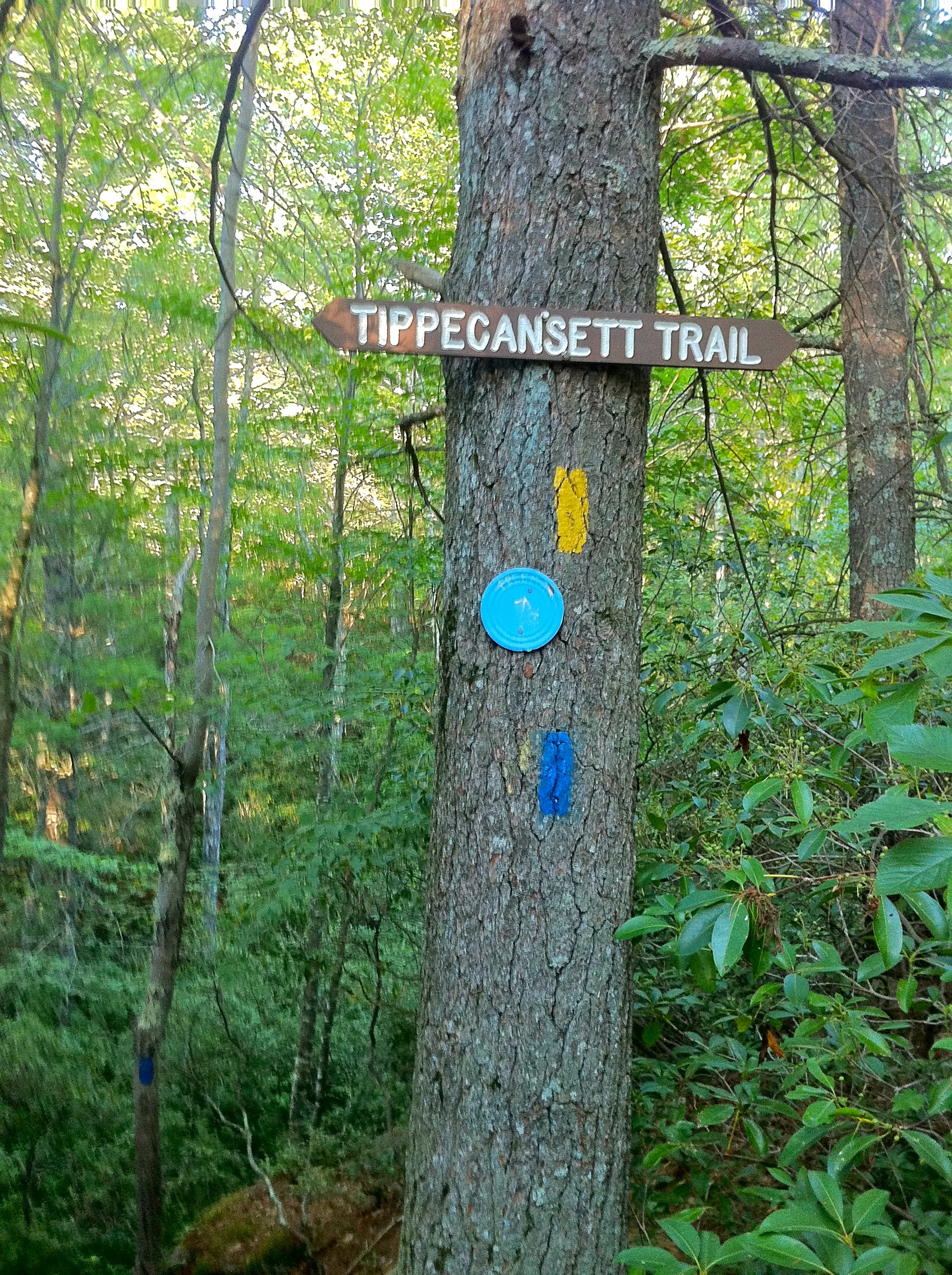
Narragansett Trail - intersection with Tippecansett Trail at the Connecticut-Rhode Island state border.

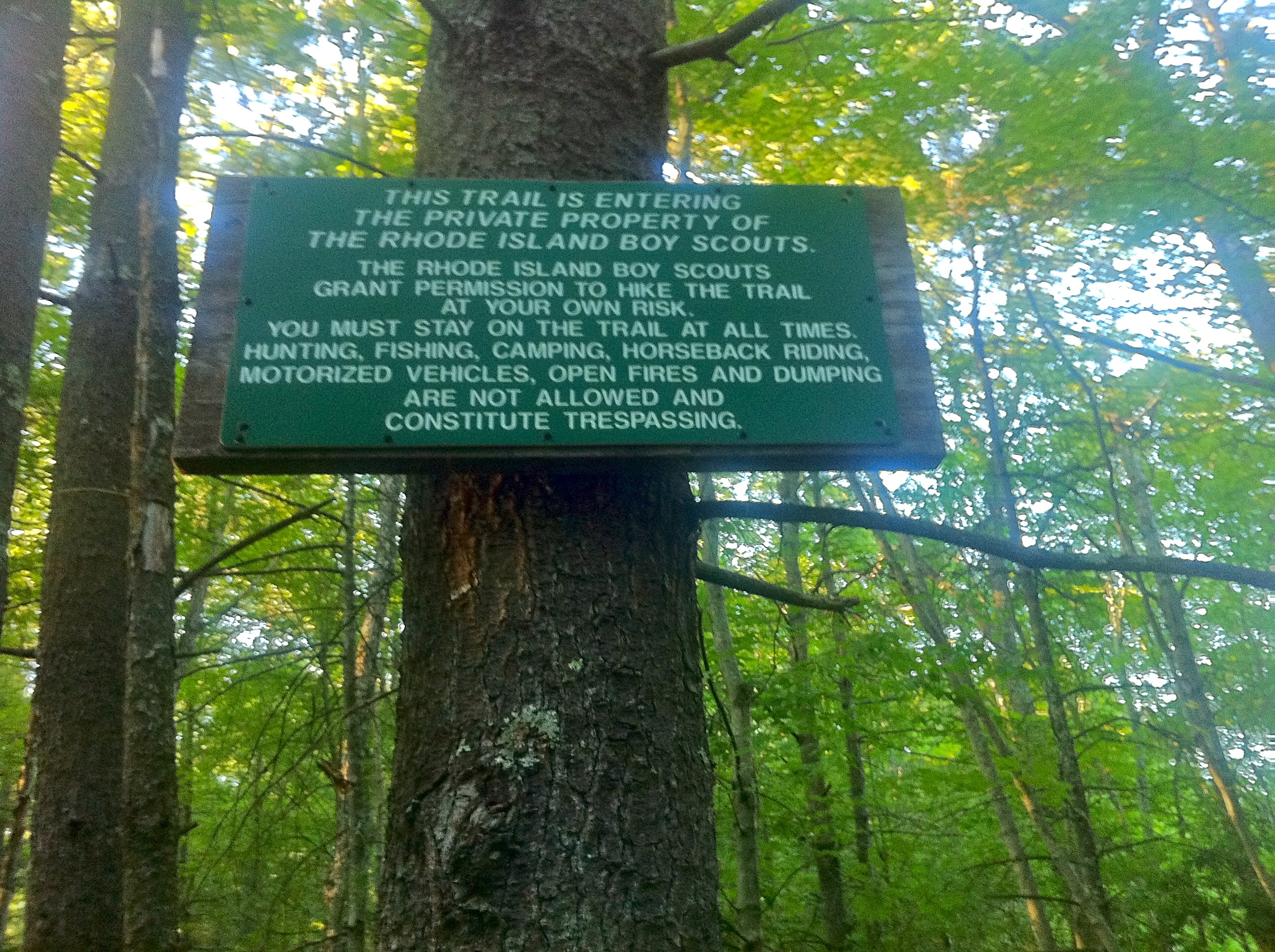
Narragansett Trail Eastern Terminus at Connecticut - Rhode Island State Line Green Fall Road. Rhode Island Boy Scouts private property sign.

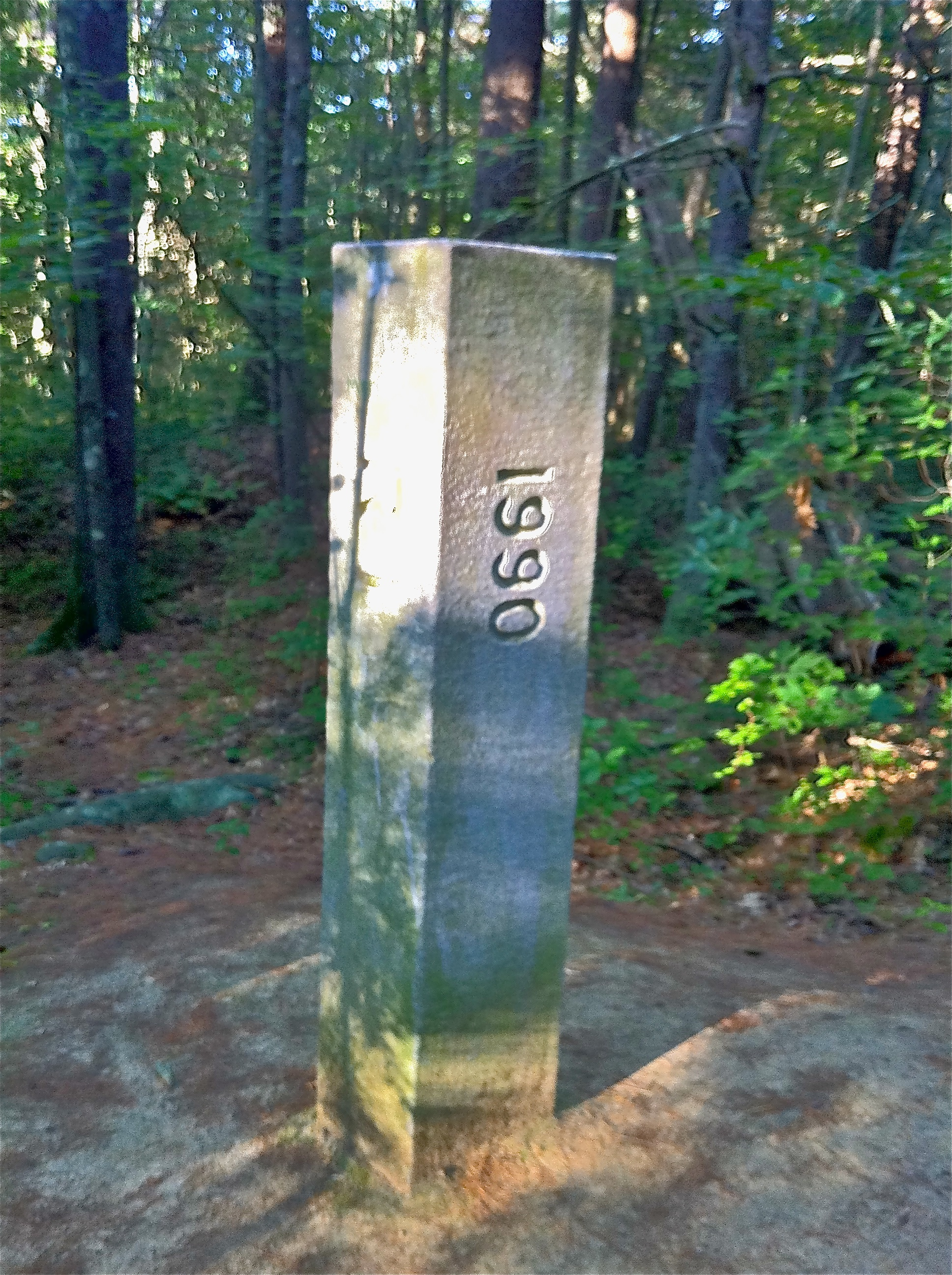
Narragansett Trail Eastern Terminus - Connecticut - Rhode Island State Line Marker on Green Fall Road.

== See also ==
- Blue-Blazed Trails
- Foxwoods
- Pequot Trail
- Nehantic Trail
- Pachaug Trail
- Pachaug State Forest
- Lantern Hill
- Mashantucket Pequot Tribe
- Narragansett (tribe)

== Bibliography ==
Heermance, Edgar L. (1935). The Connecticut Guide: What to See and Where to Find It. Hartford: Emergency Relief Commission. pp. 246–247. OCLC 719786.

Haynes, Williams; Boylan, James (1976). Stonington Historical Society (ed.). Stonington Chronology 1649-1976: Being a year-by-year record of the American way of life in a Connecticut town (2nd ed.). Chester Connecticut: Pequot Press. p. 74. ISBN 0-87106-059-0. OCLC 2523265.

Philips, David E. (1992). Legendary Connecticut: Traditional Tales from the Nutmeg State (2nd ed.). Willimantic: Curbstone. pp. 122. ISBN 1-880684-05-5. OCLC 26218340.

Pritzker, Barry M. (2000). A Native American Encyclopedia: History, Culture, and Peoples. Oxford: Oxford University Press. ISBN 978-0-19-513877-1.
