= Lantern Hill =

Hill in Connecticut, United States

Coordinates: 41°27′36″N 71°56′40″W

Lantern Hill, elevation 491 feet (149 m), is a hill located in North Stonington, New London County, Connecticut, United States.

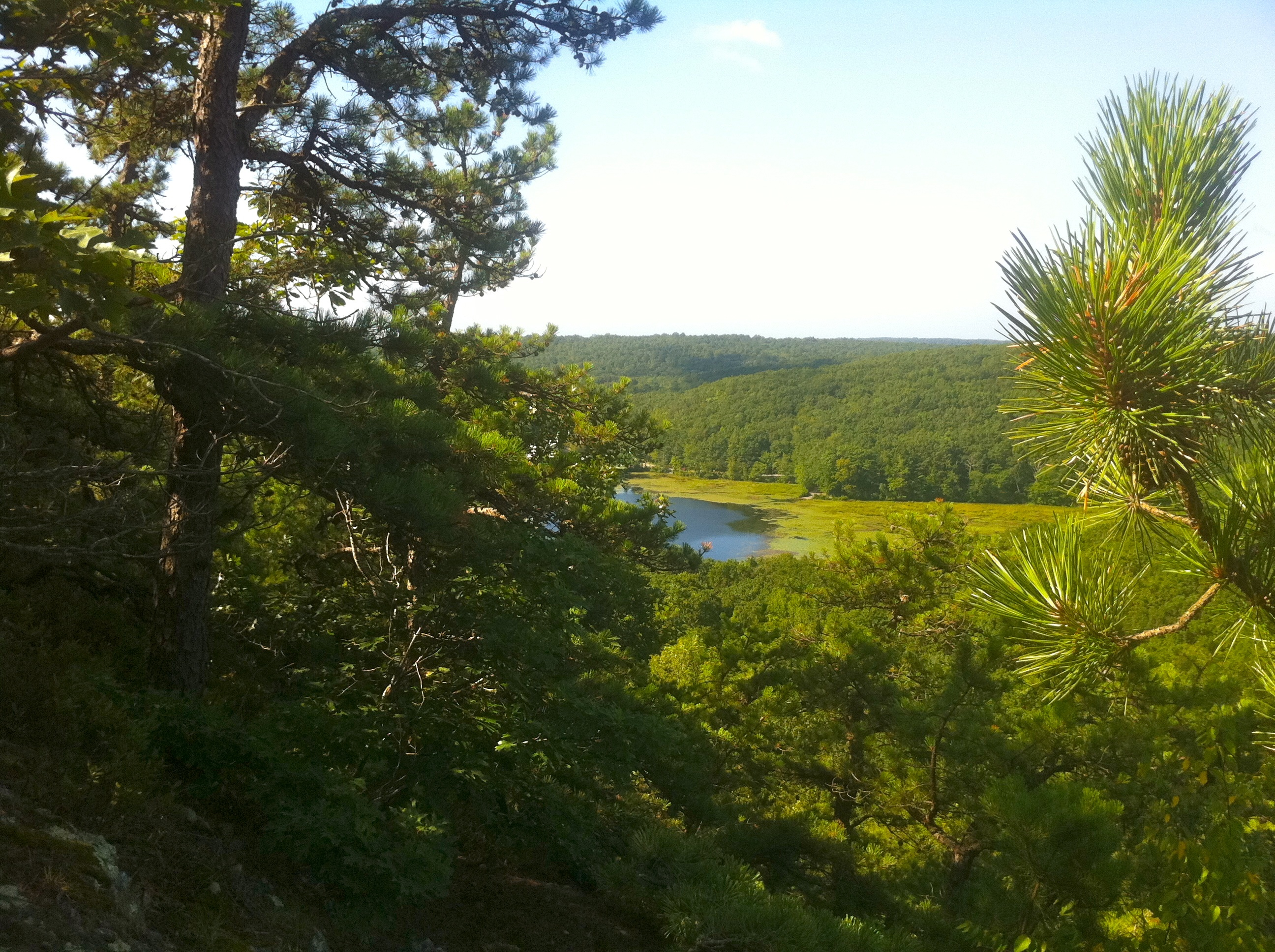
Narragansett Trail's Lantern Hill view of Lantern Hill Pond.

== Name ==
Lantern Hill

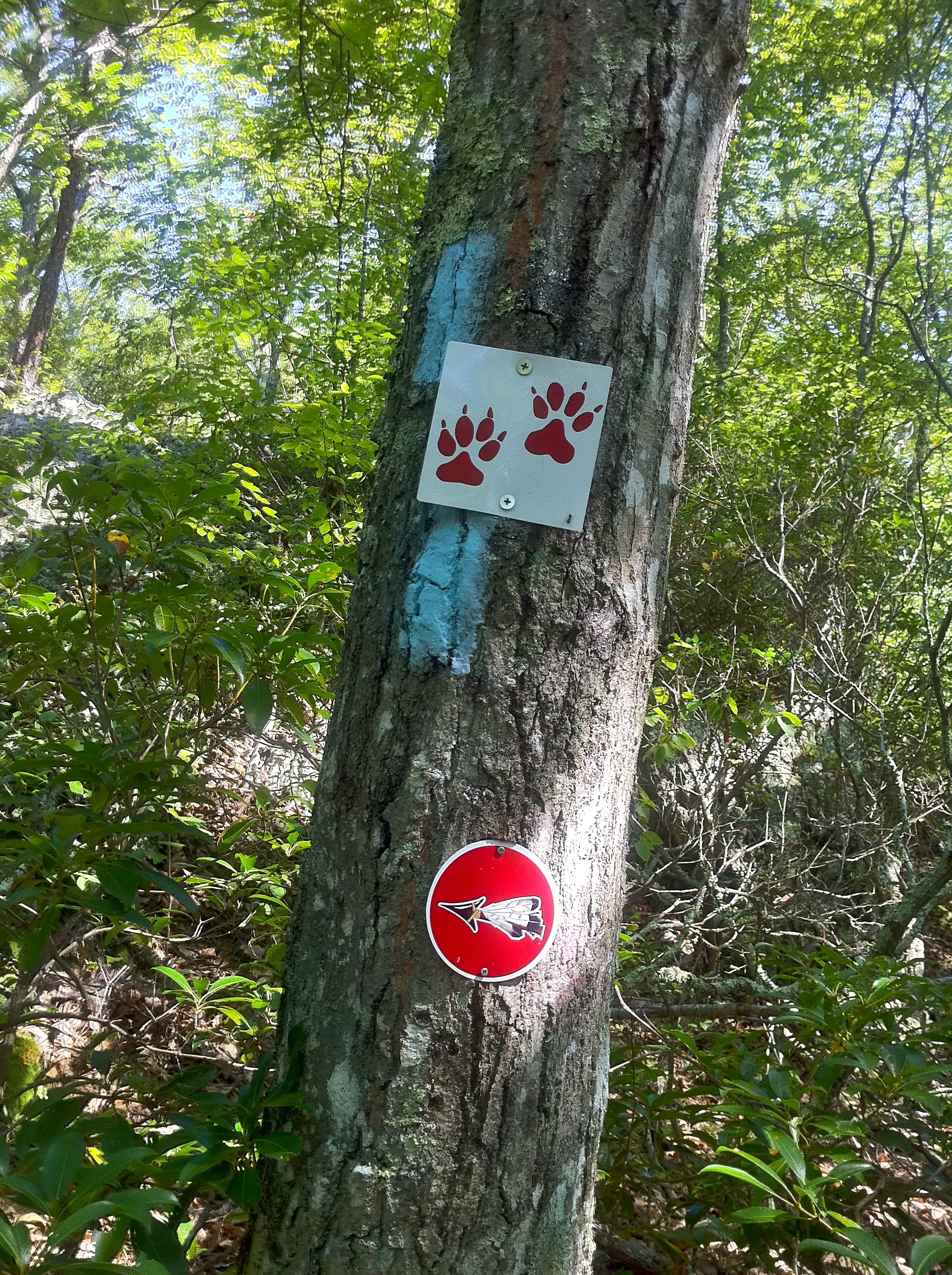
Narragansett Trail blazes with Lantern Hill and Loop Trail signs.

The hill's white quartz cliffs are said to shine in sunlight when viewed from the Atlantic Ocean (Caulkins 1895; Crandall 1949). Some consider the hill to be "Tar Barrel Hill," where barrels of tar were burned on August 11, 1814, to warn residents of the approach of the British during the War of 1812 (Philips 1992); however, "Tar Barrel Hill" may be what is now known as "Jeremy Hill" to the southeast (Heermance 1935).

== Geology ==
The hill is composed mostly of high-purity milky quartz and it occupies the inactive Lantern Hill Fault, which runs south into the Atlantic Ocean. Analysis of the quartz reveals that it is 238 million years old—the mid-Triassic Period of the Mesozoic Era in geologic time, according to current theories. The formation of the fault and the quartz are associated with the early formation of the Atlantic Ocean (Altamura 1995; Altamura 2003).

== Land use ==
David D. Mallory began commercial mining of the hill's silica in 1870 (Haynes and Boylan 1976); the quarry closed when the Mashantucket Pequots acquired the land in 1994. Lantern Hill is the southwestern terminus of the Narragansett Trail, a hiking path maintained in Connecticut by the Connecticut Forest and Park Association (CFPA 2005). The hilltop offers views of the Atlantic Ocean and the surrounding countryside, including the Mashantucket Pequots' Lantern Hill Reservation, the Mashantucket Museum and Research Center, and the Foxwoods Resort and Casino.

== Image gallery ==
Views from Lantern Hill
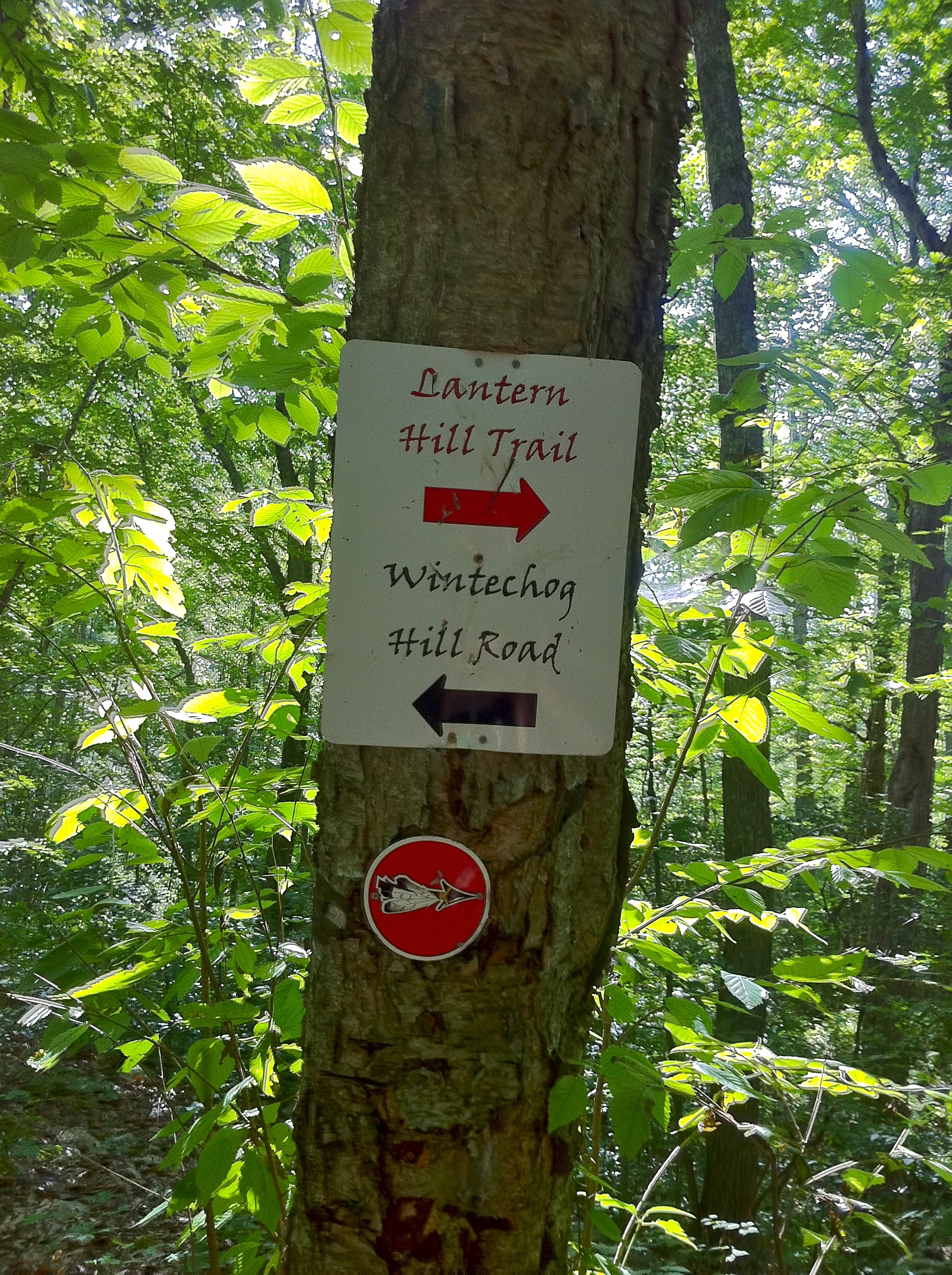
Lantern Hill Trail signs.

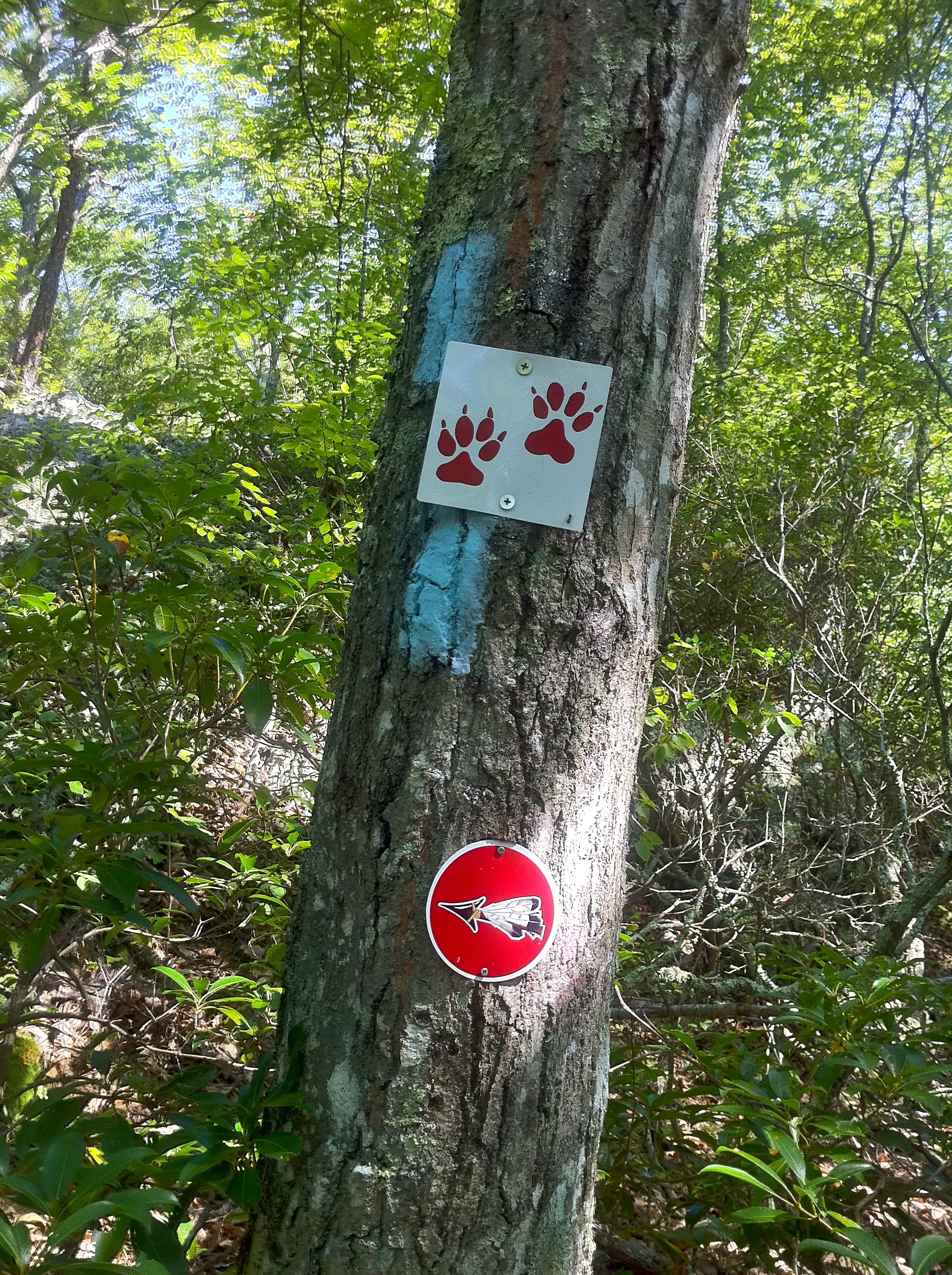
Narragansett Trail blazes with Lantern Hill and Loop Trail signs.

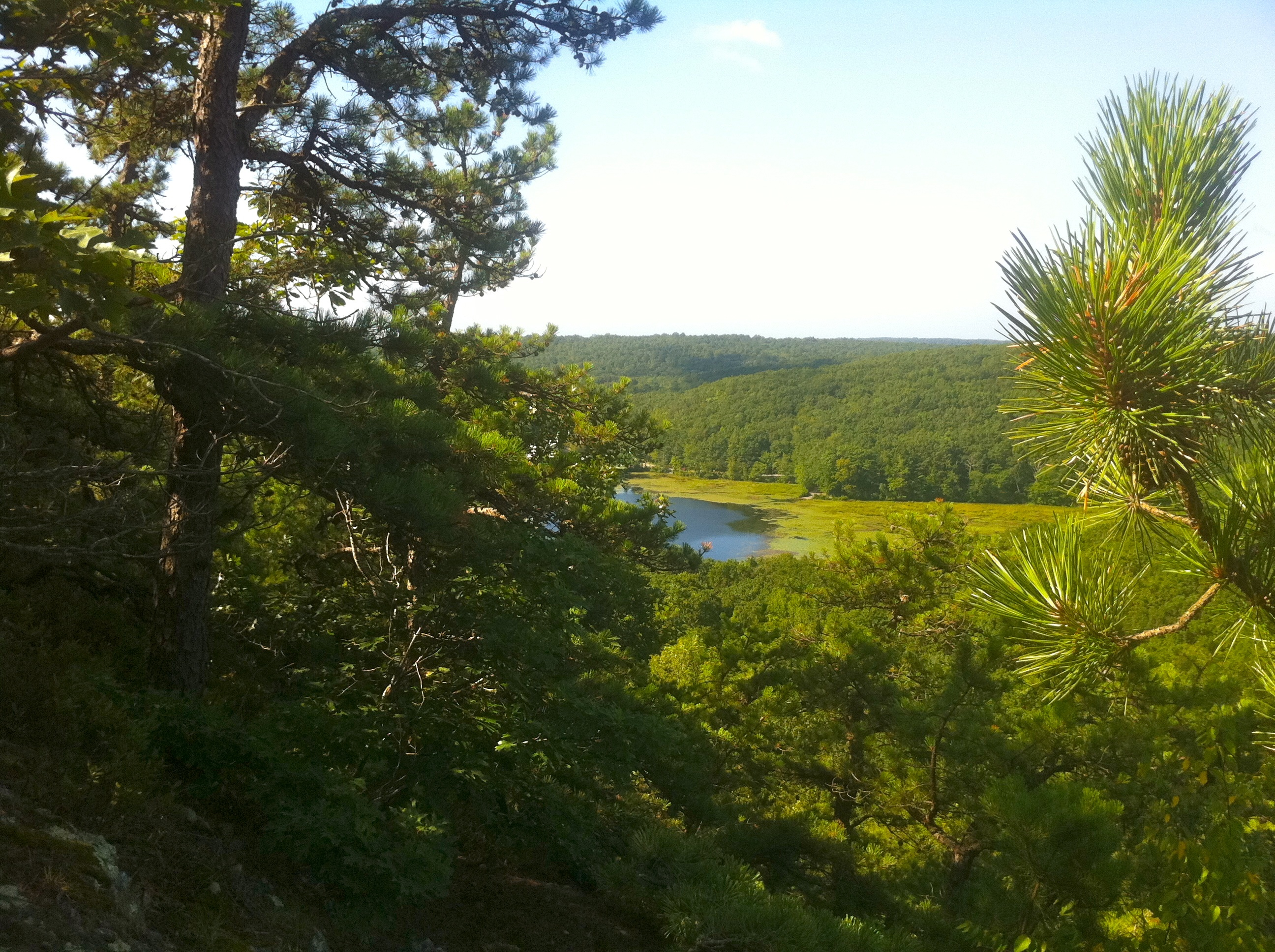
Narragansett Trail's Lantern Hill view of Lantern Hill Pond.

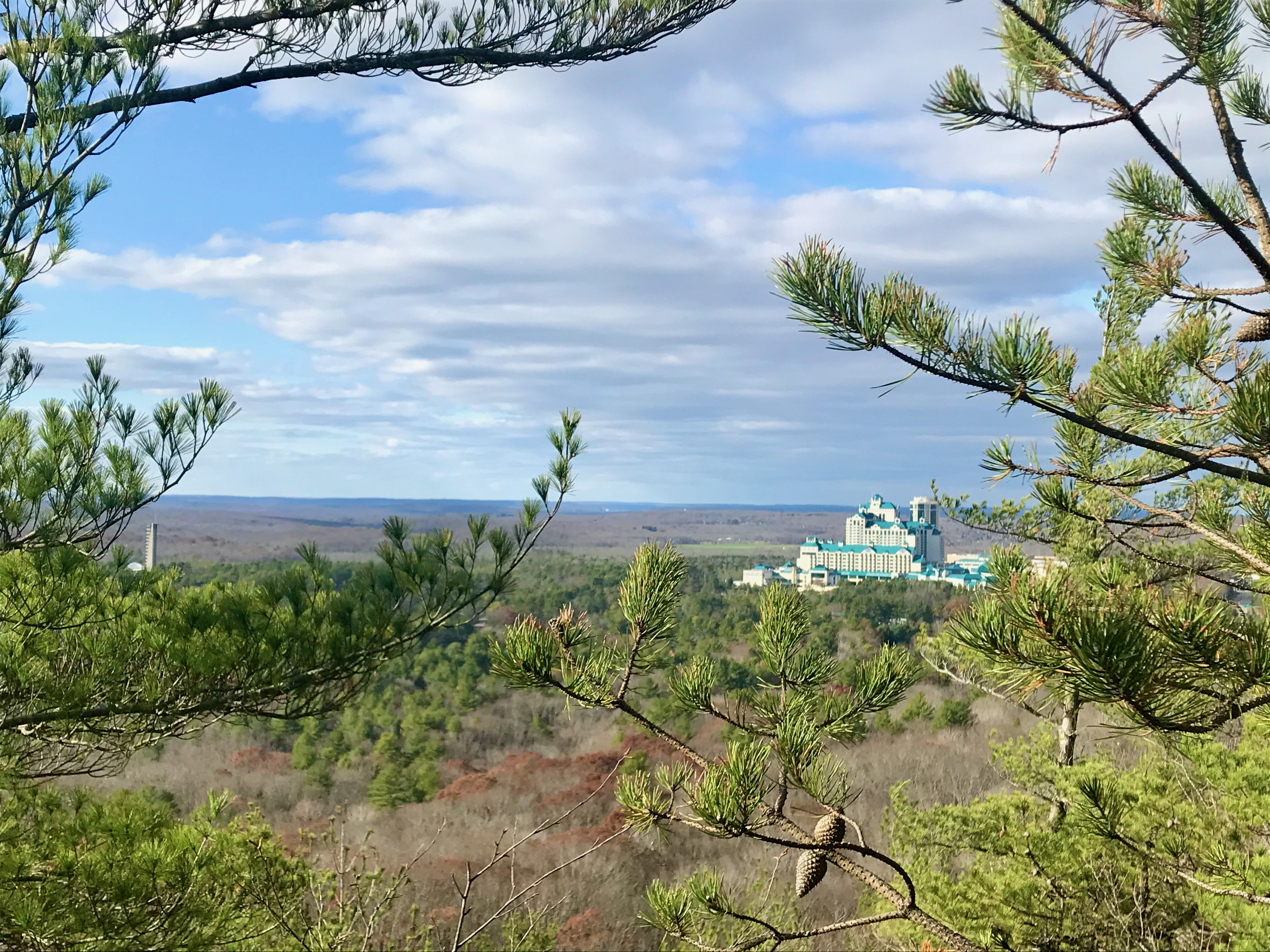
Narragansett Trail's Lantern Hill view of the Mashantucket Pequots Foxwoods Casino Resort.

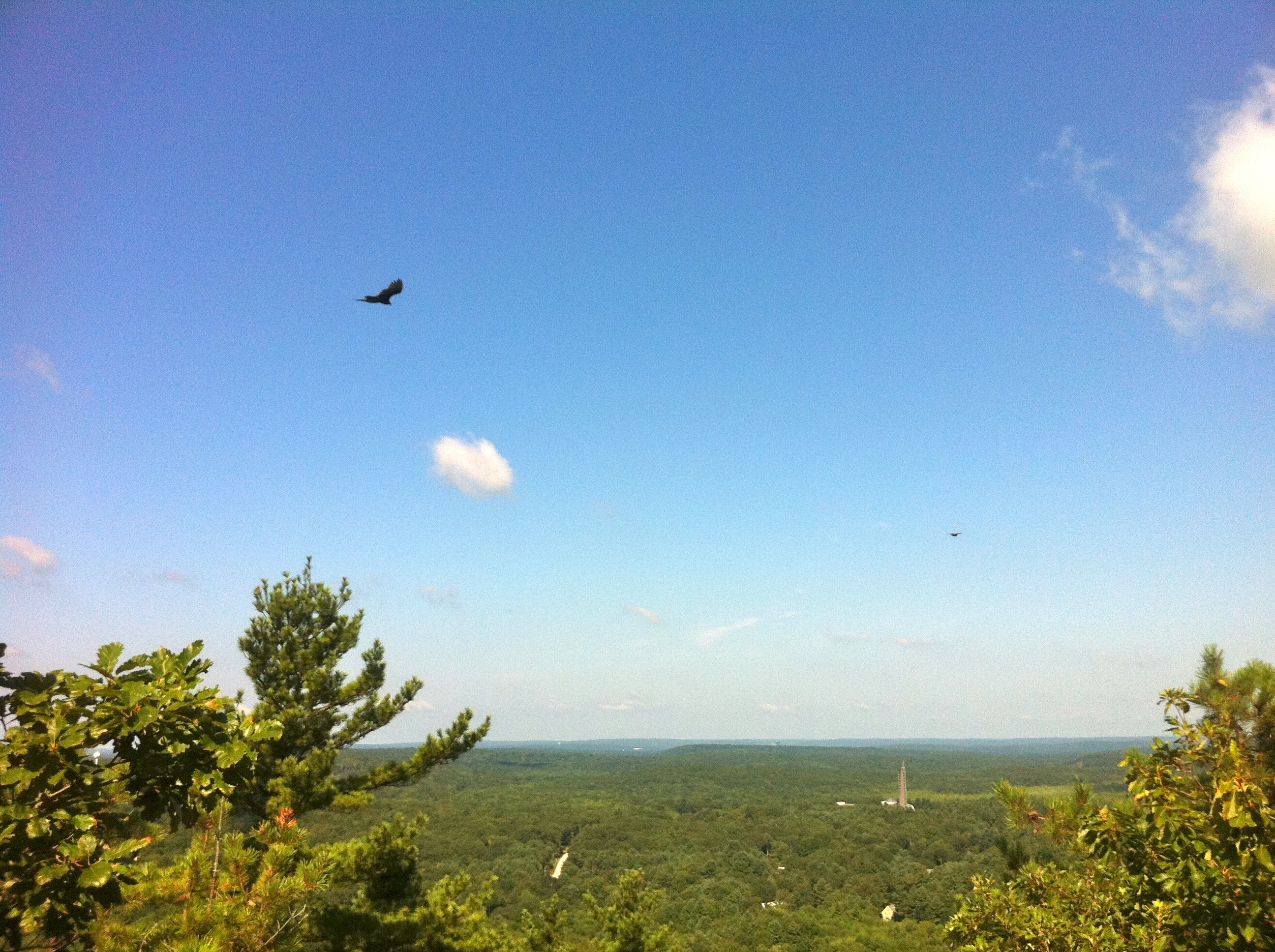
Narragansett Trail's Lantern Hill view of hawks flying. Mashantucket Pequot Museum can be seen in the far background.

== See also ==
Narragansett Trail
