= 2025 in Rhode Island =

- Decades: 2000s; 2010s; 2020s
- See also: History of Rhode Island; Historical outline of Rhode Island; List of years in Rhode Island; 2025 in the United States

The following is a list of events of the year 2025 in Rhode Island.

== Incumbents ==
=== State government ===
- Governor: Dan McKee (D)

== Events ==
- March 9 – The Providence Journal moves its printing operations to New Jersey after 195 years of operations in Rhode Island.
- July 30 – Brown University agrees to an agreement with the Trump administration, in which Brown will pay $50 million to state workforce development organization, adopting federal definitions of "male" and "female", and remove considerations of race in admissions in exchange for the Trump administration restoring federal funding.
- August 1 – A federal judge rules Rhode Island's gun permit system, which requires residents to have "a need" to openly carry in the state, does not violate the Second Amendment.
- August 22 – The Trump administration orders a halt to construction on Revolution Wind, a nearly-completed wind farm off the coast of Rhode Island, over "concerns related to the protection of national security interests". The wind farm would have provided power to 350,000 homes in Rhode Island and Connecticut.
- September 18 – Rhode Island and nine other Northeastern states announce the formation of the Northeast Public Health Collaborative, a coalition of local health leaders.
- December 13 – A school shooting occurs at Brown University in Providence, killing two people and injuring eight others. Two days later, the gunman kills a professor in Massachusetts. He kills himself in New Hampshire on December 18.

== Sports ==
- May 24 – 31: 2025 Ladies Real Tennis World Championships

== Deaths ==
- August 20 – Frank Caprio, former Chief Judge of the Municipal Court of Providence and city councilman

== See also ==
- 2025 in the United States
