= 2026 in Rhode Island =

- Decades: 2000s; 2010s; 2020s
- See also: History of Rhode Island; Historical outline of Rhode Island; List of years in Rhode Island; 2026 in the United States

The following is a list of events of the year 2026 in Rhode Island.

== Incumbents ==
=== State government ===
- Governor: Dan McKee (D)

== Events ==
- February 16 – Three people, including the shooter, are killed in a domestic shooting at the Dennis M. Lynch Arena in Pawtucket during an ice hockey game. An additional three people are injured, one of whom dies of his injures on February 25.
- February 22–24 – A major blizzard impacts Rhode Island, causing two deaths.
  - February 23 – T. F. Green International Airport sets a daily snowfall record of 35.5 inches and a total storm snowfall record of 37.9 inches, breaking records set during the Blizzard of '96 and the Blizzard of '78 respectively.
- February 27 – Defense Secretary Pete Hegseth announces the DoD will no longer allow military members to attend Brown University, among other schools.
- March 4 – Rhode Island Attorney General Peter Neronha releases a report on the findings of the sexual abuse cases by the Catholic Diocese of Providence.
- April 8 – Eleven workers are injured by an explosion at the Aspen Aerogels industrial facility in East Providence.
- August 16 – A tractor-trailer overturns on a road in Narragansett, spilling two tons of squid on the road.
- September 9 – Primary elections are held.
  - 2026 Providence mayoral election: Democratic socialist David Morales beats incumbent mayor Brett Smiley in the Democratic primary.
  - 2026 Rhode Island gubernatorial election: Helena Foulkes beats incumbent governor Dan McKee in the Democratic primary. McKee is the first incumbent governor to lose a party primary since 2018.
- November 3 – 2026 Rhode Island elections:
  - 2026 Rhode Island House of Representatives election
  - 2026 Rhode Island Attorney General election
  - 2026 Rhode Island gubernatorial election: Helena Foulkes wins the election.
  - 2026 Rhode Island lieutenant gubernatorial election
  - 2026 Rhode Island Senate election
  - 2026 United States House of Representatives elections in Rhode Island
  - 2026 United States Senate election in Rhode Island: Jack Reed wins reelection.

=== Deaths ===
- June 7: Gordon S. Wood, 92, historian

== See also ==
- 2026 in the United States
