= 2023 in Rhode Island =

- Decades: 2000s; 2010s; 2020s
- See also: History of Rhode Island; Historical outline of Rhode Island; List of years in Rhode Island; 2023 in the United States

The following is a list of events of the year 2023 in Rhode Island.

== Incumbents ==
=== State government ===
- Governor: Dan McKee (D)

== Events ==
- October – The Lindemann Performing Arts Center opens at Brown University.
- November 7 – 2023 Rhode Island's 1st congressional district special election

== See also ==
- 2023 in the United States
