= 2024 in Rhode Island =

- Decades: 2000s; 2010s; 2020s
- See also: History of Rhode Island; Historical outline of Rhode Island; List of years in Rhode Island; 2024 in the United States

The following is a list of events of the year 2024 in Rhode Island.

== Incumbents ==
=== State government ===
- Governor: Dan McKee (D)

== Events ==
- April 2 –
  - 2024 Rhode Island Democratic presidential primary
  - 2024 Rhode Island Republican presidential primary
- November 5 –
  - 2024 United States presidential election in Rhode Island
  - 2024 Rhode Island House of Representatives election

== See also ==
- 2024 in the United States
