= Country party (Rhode Island) =

Defunct political party in the United States

Country party Majority
- Leader: Arthur Fenner; James Fenner
- Founder: William West; Jonathan Hazard
- Founded: 1781
- Dissolved: 1811
- Preceded by: Whigs
- Merged into: Union party (Note: No contemporary name or term existed for this party beyond "Unionists" or "Union men" in reference to the union between the Country and Mercantile parties.) (1807–1809)
- Succeeded by: Rhode Island Republican Party
- Ideology: Rhode Islander sovereigntism (until 1790); Rhode Islander regionalism; Republicanism; Anti-federalism; Anti-mercantilism; Agrarianism; Fiat money
- Political position: Center-left
- National affiliation: Whigs (1781–1787); Federalists (1787–1789); Opposition (1789–1792); Republican Party (1792–1811)
- Colors: Blue White Red
- Slogan: To relieve the distressed
- Senate (1803–1809): 2 / 2 (peak)
- House (1801–1808): 2 / 2 (peak)

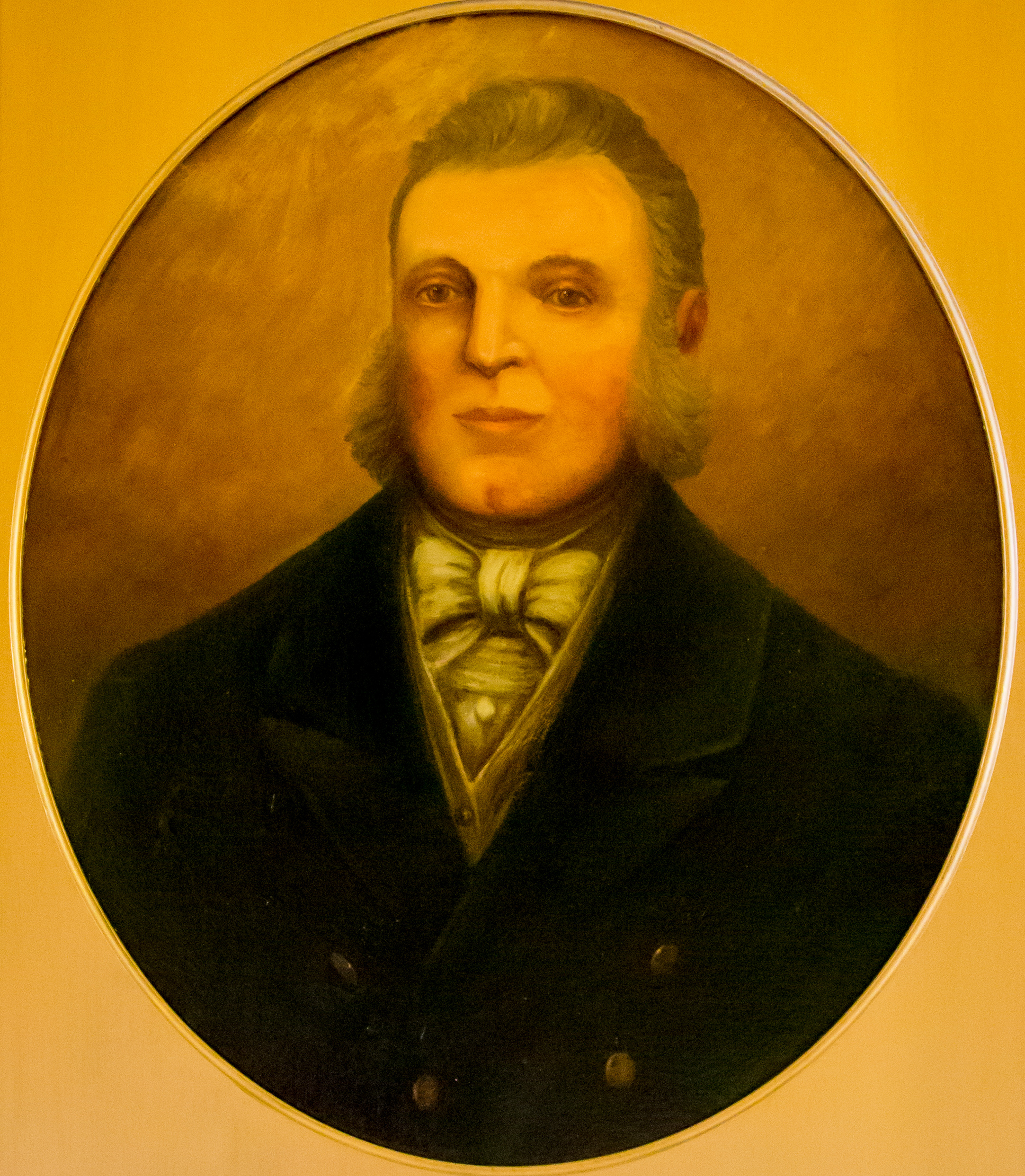
Arthur Fenner, an anti-federalist, served as Governor for 15 years

The Country party, known contemporarily in Rhode Island politics as the majority, was an early political faction and later party in Rhode Island in the Confederation and early Federal periods, lasting from about March 1781 until the end of Governor James Fenner’s tenure in May 1811. At its peak of influence, it controlled the Rhode Island General Assembly and dominated state politics from 1785 to 1790. A stridently Anti-Federalist party, it was instrumental in resisting ratification of the Constitution and was the organized vehicle for political expression of popular views that led to Rhode Island both disrupting consensus among states under the Articles of Confederation and being the last of the original 13 states to ratify the Constitution.

Rhode Island politics of the period was marked by exceptional favor for state independence. It was the first of the Thirteen Colonies to pass legislation declaring independence, doing so prior to the United States Declaration of Independence, and it was the last of the original 13 states to ratify the U.S. Constitution. The Constitution replaced the Articles of Confederation, creating a stronger national government than under the Articles. During this period, the opposition party was known as the Mercantile party, contemporarily referred to as the mercantile Interest. Between the 1807 and 1808 gubernatorial elections, the Country and Mercantile parties merged into the Union party. By the 1809 gubernatorial election, they had formally split but endorsed the same candidate, James Fenner. The Mercantile party collapsed around 1810, allowing Fenner to run unopposed on only the Country/Republican ticket, removing any remaining, albeit minor, traces of Rhode Island’s old political faction system in time for the 1811 election.

The Country party opposed the Constitution largely because of civil liberties concerns driving distrust of distant and large government; opposition to slavery in which the mercantile economy, but not the rural economy, of Rhode Island was invested; and disagreements about projected monetary policy, specifically a desire to maintain state-issued paper currency as legal tender at face value. Some of these views found mainstream expression in the Bill of Rights, while others were addressed by other compromises or in some cases suppressed. Under Country party leadership, Rhode Island carried opposition well beyond insisting on a Bill of Rights, and had to be prodded into the new Union.

== Control of the General Assembly ==
Scituate's William West and South Kingstown's Jonathan Hazard were leaders of the rural Country party which opposed the Constitution. The party "was suspicious of the power and the cost of a government too far removed from the grass-roots level, and so it declined to dispatch delegates to the Philadelphia Convention of 1787, which drafted the United States Constitution. Then, when that document was presented to the states for ratification, Hazard's faction delayed, and nearly prevented, Rhode Island's approval."

Quakers were among those in Rhode Island who opposed the Constitution; they were opposed to it largely because of its sanctioning of slavery. Baptists were also opposed, as one of the largest denominations in Rhode Island who had historically been persecuted by various governments. Many were also concerned that the government created by the Constitution would violate natural rights, and they wanted a Bill of Rights to protect individual liberties. In the rural areas of Rhode Island, citizens wanted to ensure that their paper currency was redeemable as legal tender in the future.

== Passage of the Constitution and William West's protest ==
Ratification by the legislatures of nine states had been required for the Constitution to take effect. Effectively, this requirement represented nine of 12, as Rhode Island had already earned a reputation for poor cooperation in the Congress of the Confederation and had declined to participate in the Constitutional Convention in Philadelphia.

While at least five states quickly ratified unconditionally, beginning with Delaware on December 7, 1787, as opponents organized more effectively it became clear that fewer than nine states were projected to ratify without at least an informal guarantee that the proposed new Congress would append key draft amendments, or a Bill of Rights, to the Constitution. Proponents of the Constitution compromised and agreed. As public discussion of these draft amendments progressed and confidence in the compromise grew, more members of remaining state legislatures came to favor ratification. On June 21, 1788, New Hampshire became the ninth state to ratify and news quickly reached Rhode Island.

William West led nearly 1,000 armed farmers to Providence to protest an ox roast celebration and toast to the Constitution on Independence Day, July 4, 1788. Violence between the Federalists and Anti-Federalists was averted when the Federalists agreed to celebrate only independence and not the Constitution. This incident became national news.

By the end of July 1788, Virginia and New York had ratified, bringing the total to 11, excluding only North Carolina and Rhode Island and making universal ratification subject to adoption of a Bill of Rights virtually inevitable. The Constitution took effect when the First Congress convened on March 4, 1789. George Washington was inaugurated as President in April. The First Congress proposed the Bill of Rights in September, to be duly ratified by state legislatures and to take effect roughly two years later. In November, North Carolina ratified the Constitution. Its senators were seated in January 1790, and its five representatives beginning in March.

Anti-Federalist opinion in Rhode Island, which retained wide popular support and for which the Country party was the vehicle, clearly had helped ensure a Bill of Rights. However, by the spring of 1790, months after a finalized Bill of Rights was approved by a smoothly functioning Congress from which only Rhode Island remained awkwardly absent, resistance to ratification seemed absurd rather than principled. Rhode Island resembled not a confidently self-governing republic choosing its own sustainable political and economic destiny, but a state making an inexplicably negative choice to be unrepresented in its own Federal union by stubbornly ignoring it. Exerting informal leverage amid a measure of national public ridicule of the state, the new Federal Government pressured "Rogue Island" to conform, but also welcomed its eventual accession.

The Rhode Island legislature had delayed a constitutional convention 11 times, but finally called for one in South Kingstown, or the village of Kingston, in March 1790. Its members failed to agree, so another convention was held in Newport, a center of Federalist opinion, in May. There, the Constitution narrowly passed after several Anti-Federalists absented themselves and Governor John Collins decided to support the Constitution, effectively ending his political career. Rhode Island was the last of the original states to ratify, and by the margin of 34 votes to 32. Its first senators were seated on June 25, 1790, and its first representative was seated on December 17, during the third session of the First Congress and only weeks before that Congress admitted Vermont.

== Aftermath ==
Rhode Islanders elected Anti-Federalist Arthur Fenner as governor for the next 15 years. After passage of the Constitution, some Country party leaders were left bankrupt, such as William West, because the Federal Government refused to recognize the state's paper money as legal tender.
