= Jonathan Hazard =

American politician

Jonathan J. Hazard (c. 1744 – after 1824) (Note: William Adams Slade notes the middle initial J. was not initially used.) was an American statesman and Anti-Federalist who served as a delegate for Rhode Island in the Continental Congress.

Jonathan was born to a Quaker (Religious Society of Friends) family in Newport, Rhode Island, to Jonathan and Abigail (MacCoon) Hazard. He was known as "Beau Jonathan" to distinguish him form other Rhode Island Hazards, on account of his fondness for dress and his courtly manners. He was first elected to the Rhode Island General Assembly in 1776. In 1777 and early 1778 he served as paymaster of the Rhode Island regiment of the Continental Army. In 1778, he re-entered the Assembly, serving there until 1786. In 1786 and 1787, Rhode Island's assembly appointed him as delegate to the Continental Congress. After that, he returned to assembly (serving until 1805), where he became a leader of the anti-federalist Country Party.

Hazard was a delegate to the state's ratifying convention that considered the U.S. Constitution in 1789. His active opposition was one of the reasons that the convention adjourned without a vote. By the following spring, he at least chose to remain silent as the Assembly voted in favor of ratification on May 29, 1790. That marked the start of a steady decline in his political influence.

He was married first to Patience Hazard, his second cousin. In 1805 he along with his wife and their younger children moved west to a new settlement that was being established by the Society of Friends (Quakers) in Oneida County, New York.

His first wife died in 1809, and he married secondly Hannah Brown; his third wife was Marian, daughter of Moses Gage. He died sometime after 1824.
