= Ratification of the United States Constitution by Rhode Island =

1790 decision Rhode Island

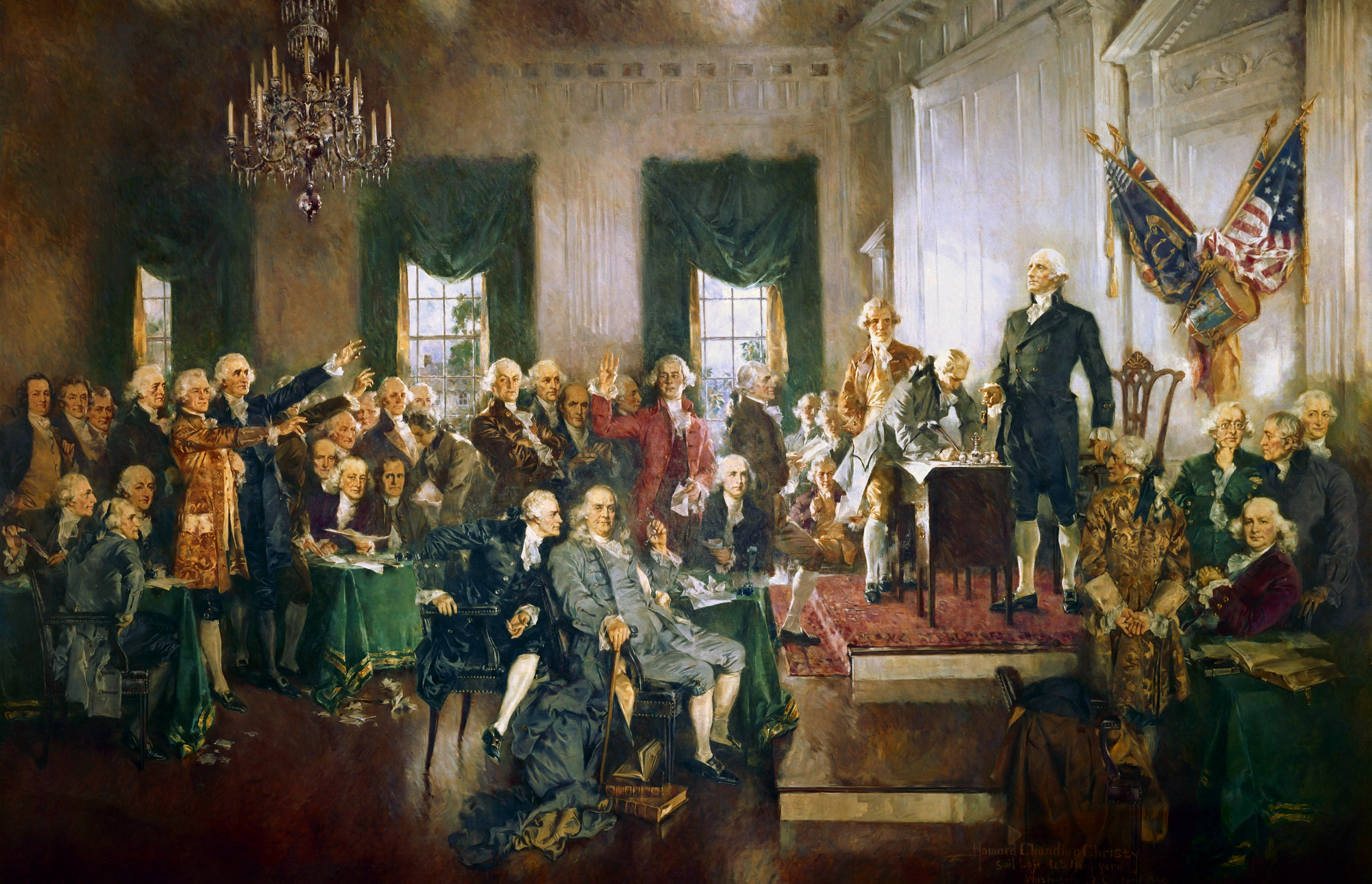
Scene at the Signing of the Constitution of the United States, a 1940 painting by Howard Chandler Christy depicting the 1787 event. No representatives from Rhode Island are shown in this painting, as the state refused to send a delegation.

The ratification of the United States Constitution by Rhode Island in 1790 was a controversial process which occurred only after the United States threatened a trade embargo against Rhode Island for non-compliance.

== Background ==
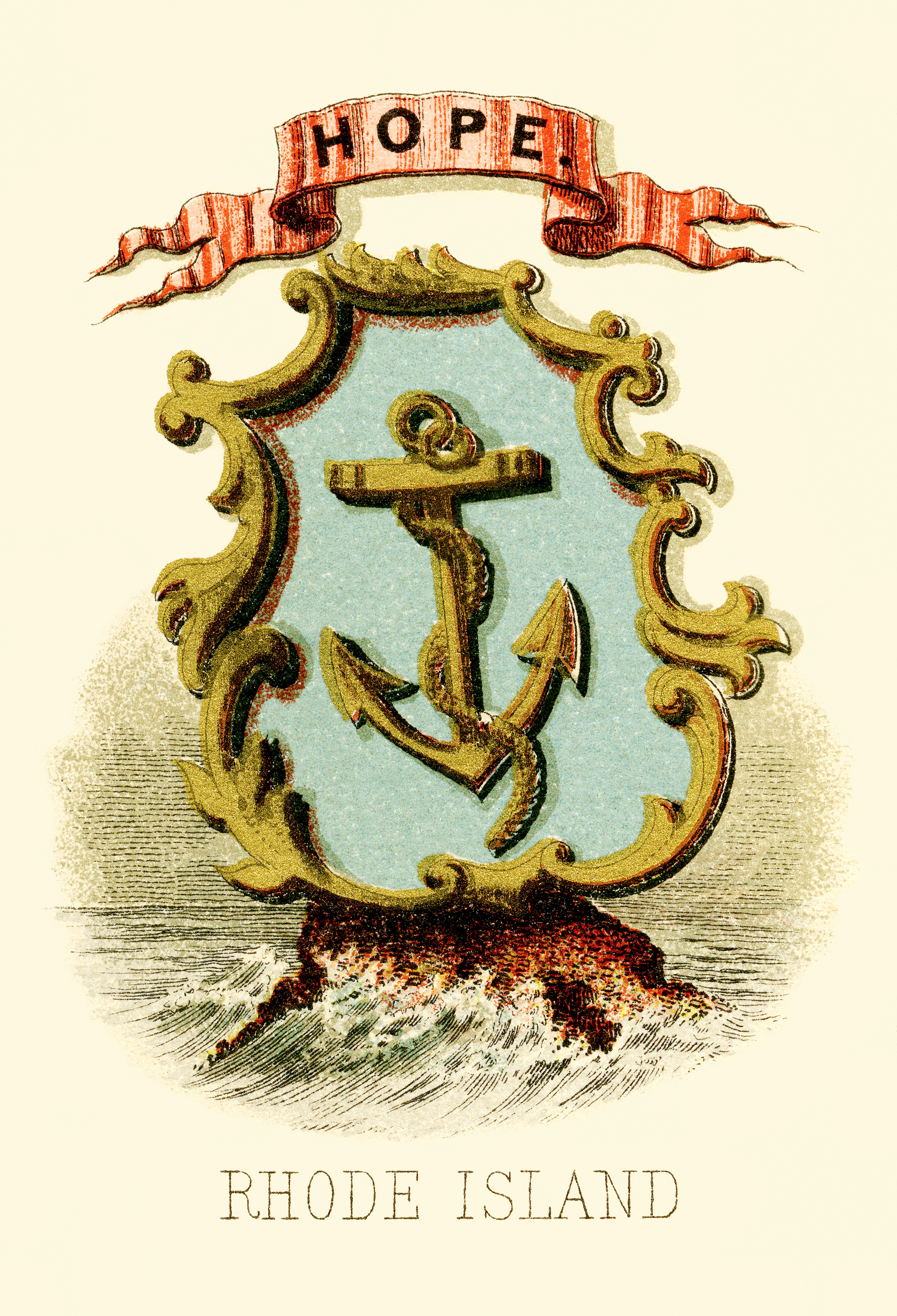
Rhode Island state coat of arms

Rhode Island acquired a reputation for opposing a closer union with the other former British colonies that had formed the United States of America. It vetoed an act of the Congress of the Confederation which earned it a number of deprecatory nicknames, including "Rogue Island" and "the Perverse Sister".

One provision of the Articles of Confederation stated that an amendment to the Articles could only be made with the approval of all the states, and this gave any state a functional veto power over amendments. Other states opposed amendments that might harm their own interests, but Rhode Island was particularly ready to use its veto power. The Confederation Congress called a convention to discuss amendments that would address this and other perceived shortcomings in the Articles, to be convened in Philadelphia in May 1787. But Rhode Island refused to send a delegation, and the convention instead set about drafting a new Constitution. Rhode Island was the only state that did not participate in its proceedings.

== Ratification of the Constitution ==
The new Constitution took effect on March 4, 1789, since the required nine states had completed their ratification process, and the First United States Congress proposed 12 amendments on September 25. Rhode Island still had not ratified the Constitution and continued to effectively operate outside the new governmental structure.

Rhode Island's opposition was chiefly due to the paper money issued in Rhode Island pounds since 1786 by the governing Country Party, intended to pay off the state's burdensome Revolutionary War debt. Other issues included fear of direct federal taxes and aversion to the lengthy terms for members of Congress. The state's large Quaker population was offended by provisions on the slave trade, while the Federalists' scorn for the state's "excess of democracy" made its residents see the Constitution as a threat. The handful of federalist supporters in Rhode Island were chiefly among the mercantile classes of Providence and Newport.

Nearly a dozen conventions that had been called in Rhode Island to ratify the constitution failed to do so, often by wide margins; in one instance, 92 percent of the delegates voted against ratification. A force of 1,000 Country Party supporters descended on Providence on July 4, 1788, to break up celebrations of New Hampshire's ratification, and armed confrontation was averted only after organizers agreed that the celebrations would commemorate only Independence Day and not New Hampshire's ratification.

On May 18, 1790, the United States Senate passed a bill that would ban all trade with Rhode Island if enacted, effectively isolating the diminutive state from the Union. The Rhode Island General Assembly capitulated 11 days later and ratified the Constitution, before the proposed embargo could be acted on by the United States House of Representatives. However, the General Assembly's ratification included a lengthy list of caveats, including that "the powers of government may be reassumed by the people whensoever it shall become necessary." The ratification also contained a list of proposed amendments to the Constitution that Rhode Island wished to see taken up, such as abolition of the slave trade.

Rhode Island Congressman Benjamin Bourne took his seat that year on August 31.

== Ratification of constitutional amendments ==
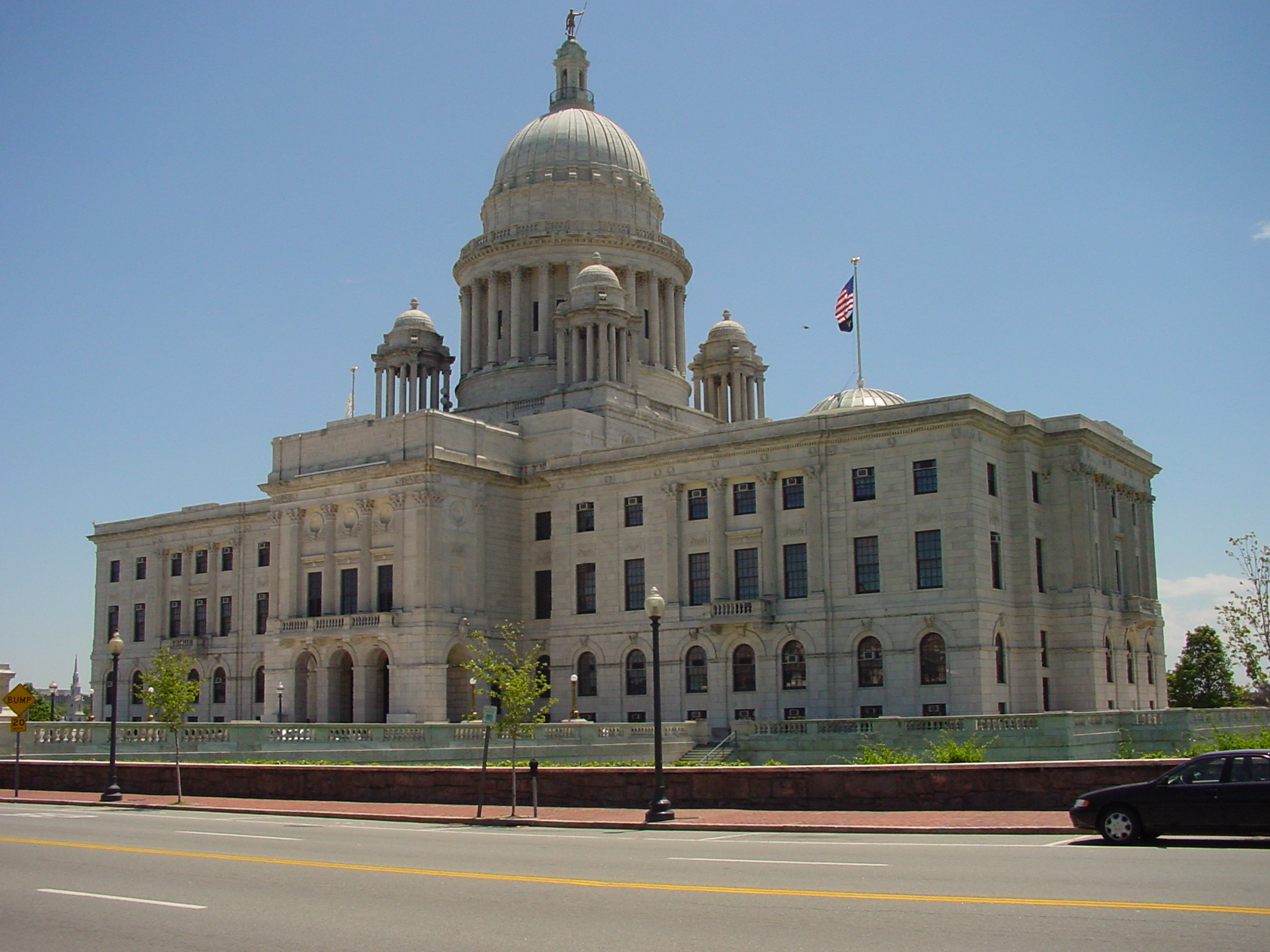
The Rhode Island General Assembly took 101 years to ratify the Constitution's Seventeenth Amendment.

Rhode Island took 101 years to call a vote on ratification of the Seventeenth Amendment, which began the direct election of senators. The measure came into force in 1913, but the Rhode Island General Assembly did not take up debate on it until 2013, finally passing it the following year.

Rhode Island earlier rejected the Sixteenth Amendment establishing a federal income tax, which came into force in 1913 despite its opposition.

Rhode Island did not ratify the Eighteenth Amendment, which prohibited the manufacture, sale and transportation of alcohol.

== See also ==
- Dorr Rebellion
- History of Rhode Island
