= 1811 Rhode Island gubernatorial election =

- April 3, 1811
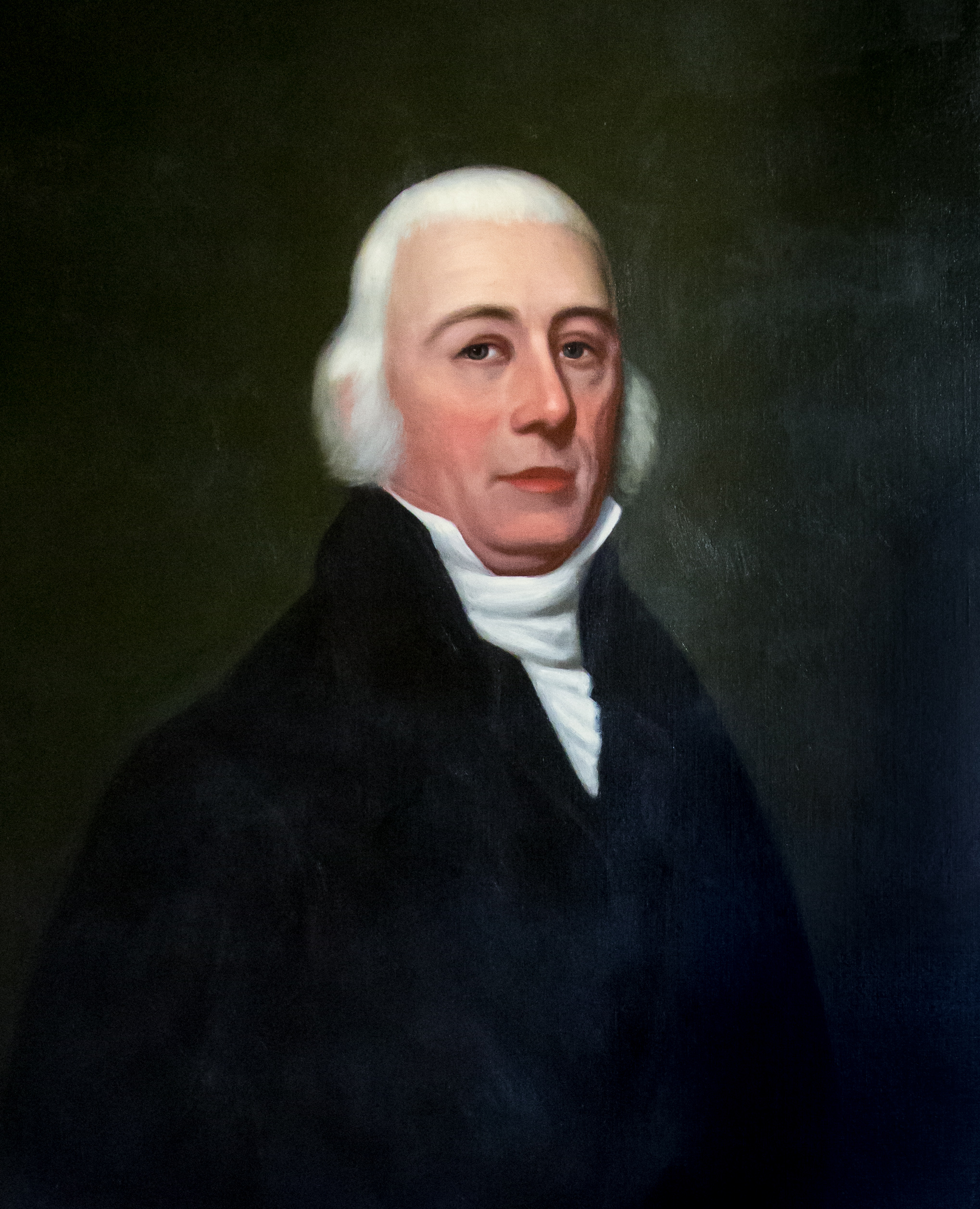

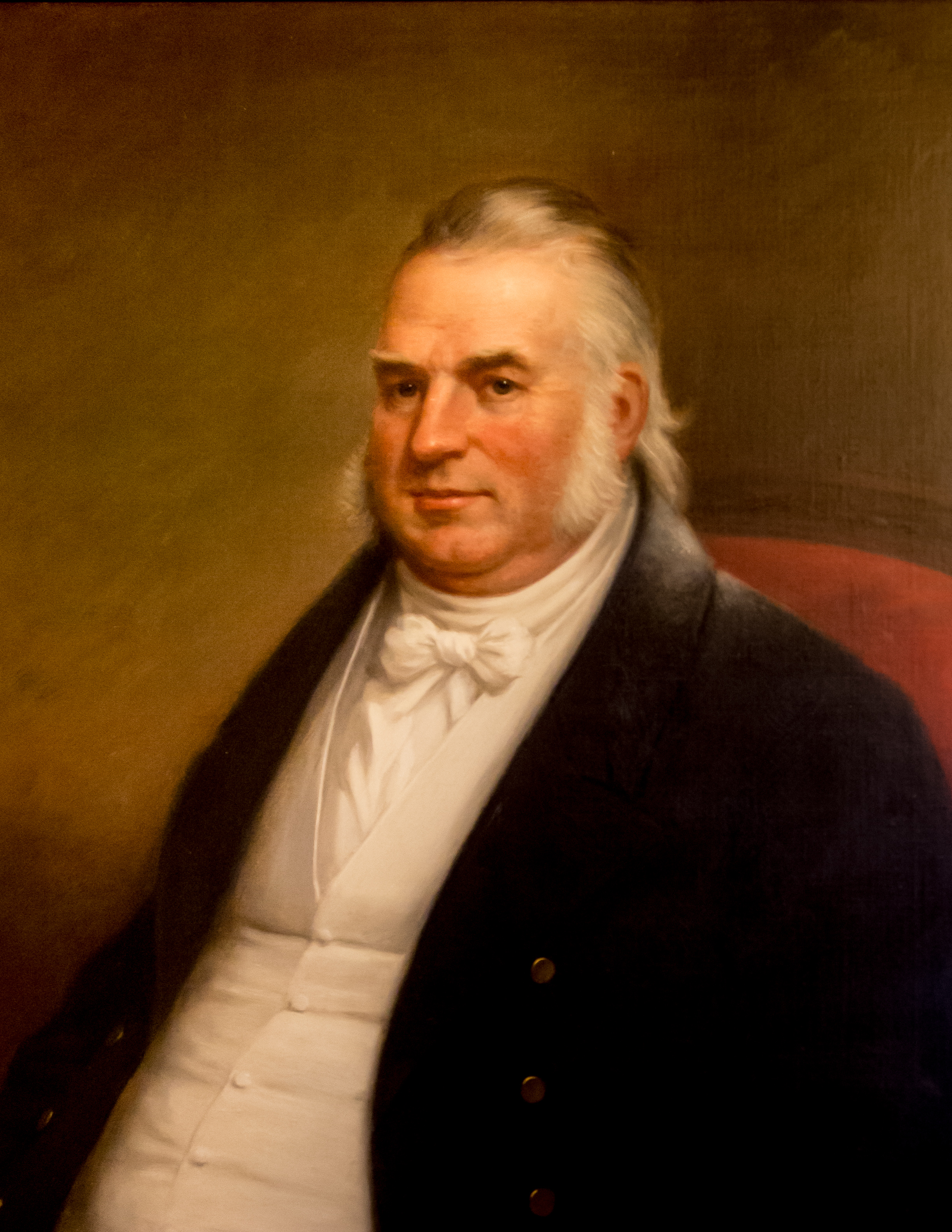
Nominee	William Jones	James Fenner
Party	Federalist	Democratic-Republican
Popular vote	3,885	3,651
Percentage	51.13%	48.05%
- County results Jones: 50–60% Fenner: 50–60% 60–70%
Governor before election
James Fenner
Democratic-Republican
Elected Governor
William Jones
Federalist

The 1811 Rhode Island gubernatorial election was held on April 3, 1811, in order to elect the governor of Rhode Island. Federalist nominee William Jones defeated incumbent Democratic-Republican governor James Fenner.

== General election ==
On election day, April 3, 1811, Federalist nominee William Jones won the election by a margin of 234 votes against his opponent incumbent Democratic-Republican governor James Fenner, thereby gaining Federalist control over the office of governor. Jones was sworn in as the 8th governor of Rhode Island on May 1, 1811.

=== Results ===
Rhode Island gubernatorial election, 1811
Party	Candidate	Votes	%
Federalist	William Jones	3,885	51.13
Democratic-Republican	James Fenner (incumbent)	3,651	48.05
	Scattering	62	0.82
Total votes		7,704	100.00
Federalist gain from Democratic-Republican			
