= History of Rhode Island =

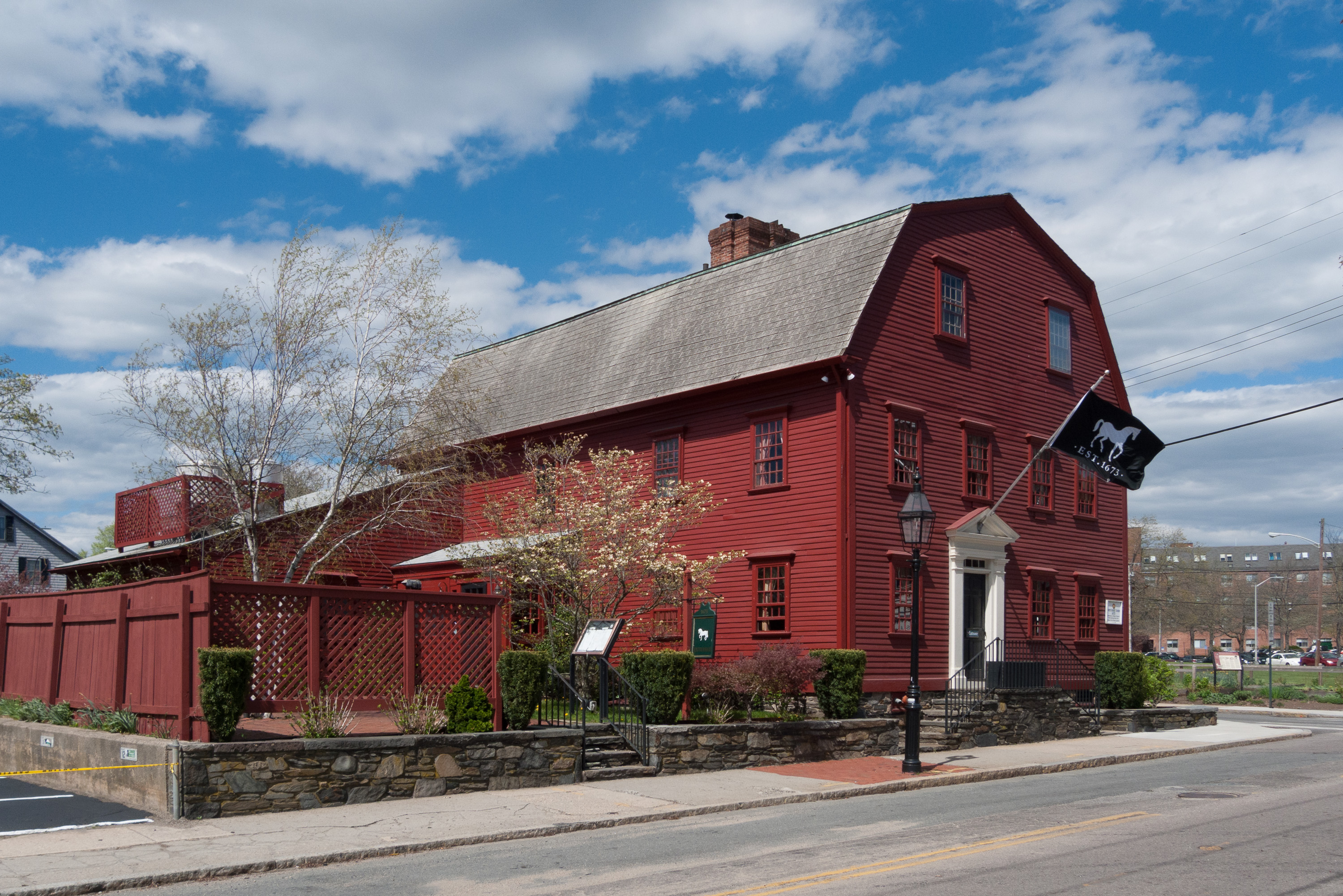
The White Horse Tavern (circa 1673) in Newport is one of the oldest extant buildings in Rhode Island

The history of Rhode Island is an overview of the Colony of Rhode Island and Providence Plantations and the state of Rhode Island from pre-colonial times to the present.

== Pre-colonization ==
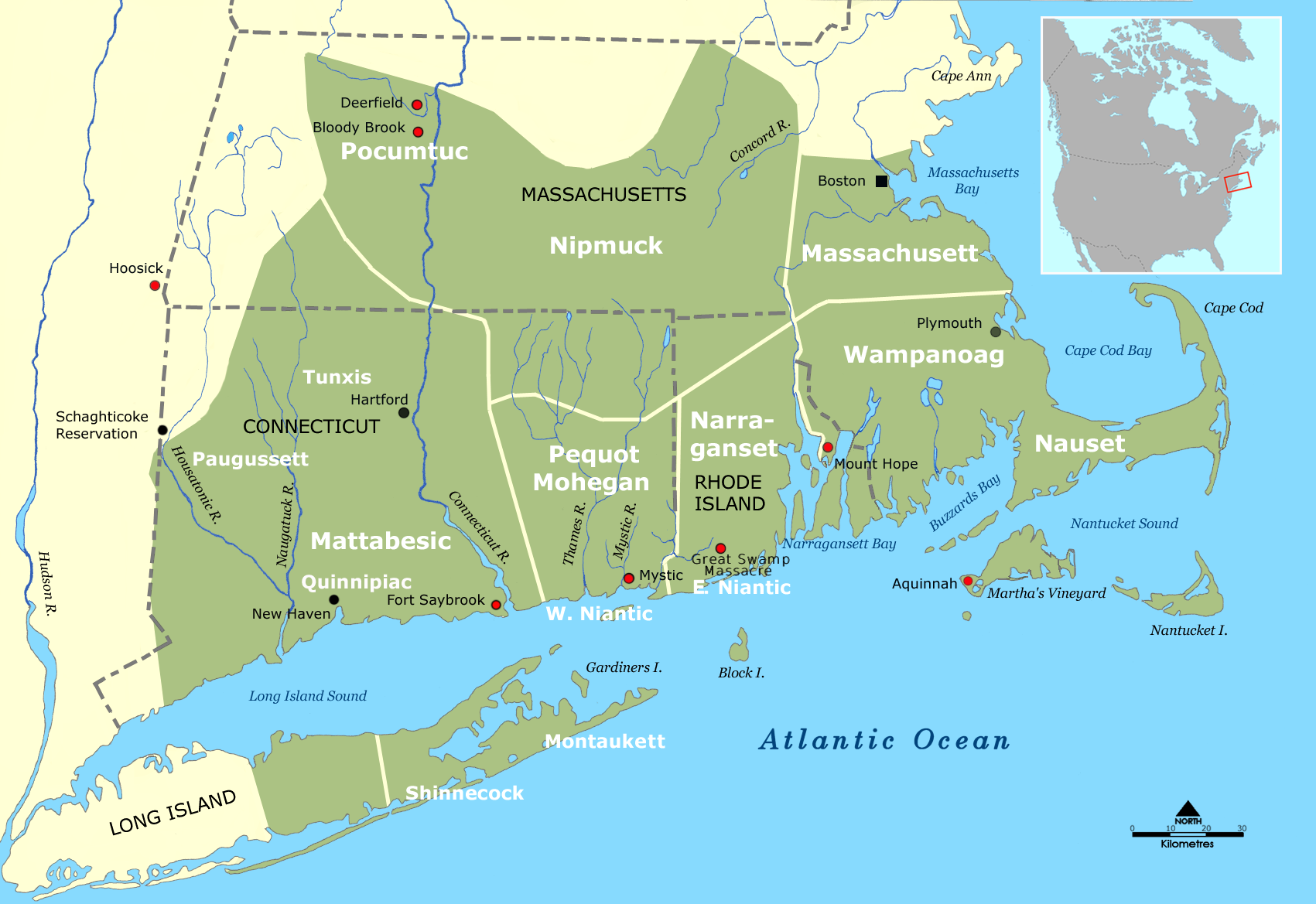
Tribal territories of the indigenous peoples of what is now southeastern New England

Native Americans occupied most of the area comprising Rhode Island, including the Wampanoag, Narragansett, and Niantic tribes. Many were killed by diseases, possibly contracted through contact with European explorers, and through warfare with other tribes. The Narragansett language eventually died out, although it was partially preserved in Roger Williams's A Key into the Languages of America (1643).

== Rhode Island Colony period: 1636–1776 ==
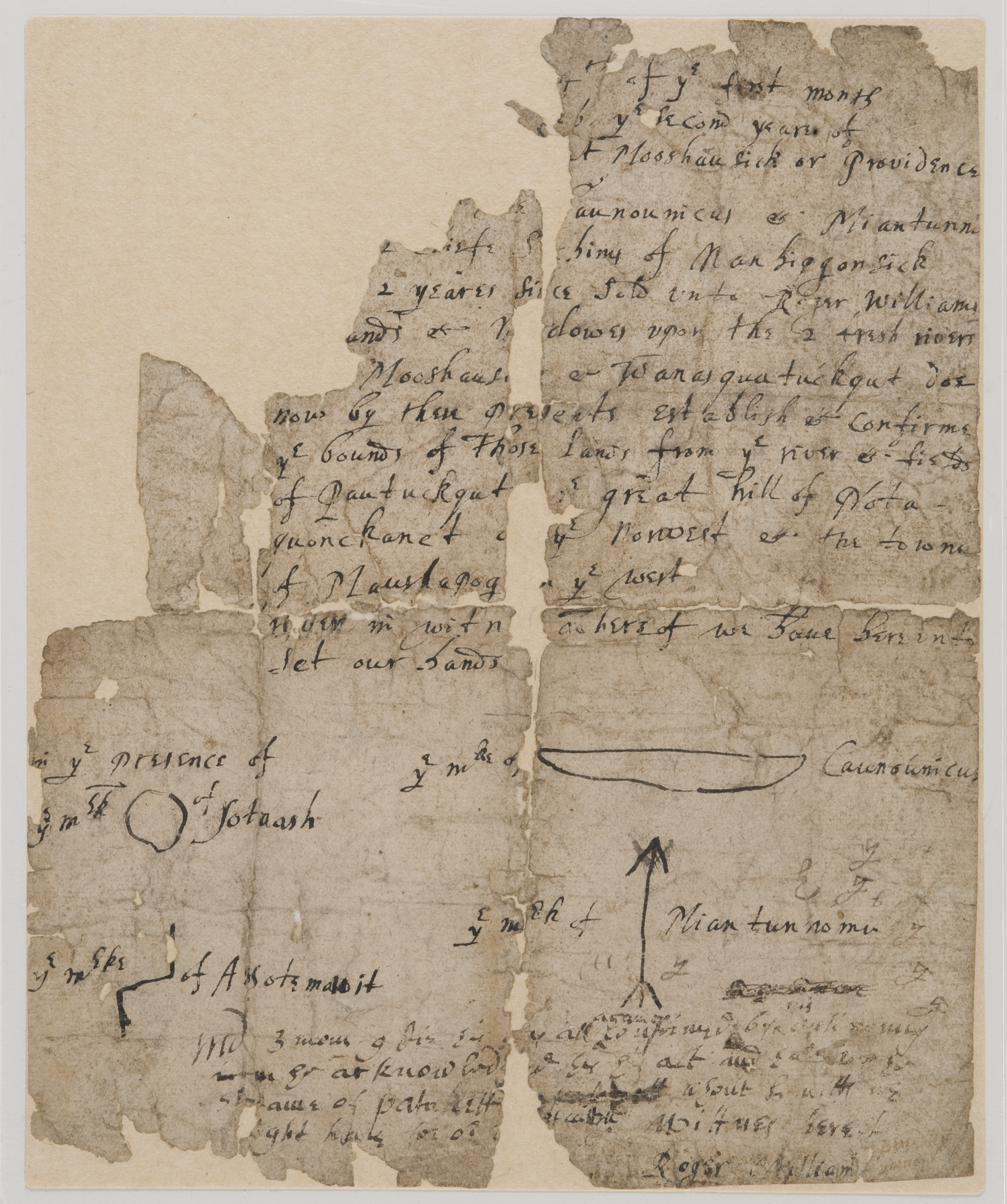
The original 1636 deed to Providence, signed by Chief Canonicus

In 1636, Roger Williams settled on land granted to him by the Narragansett tribe at the tip of Narragansett Bay after being banished from the Massachusetts Bay Colony for his religious views. He called the site "Providence Plantations" and declared it a place of religious freedom.

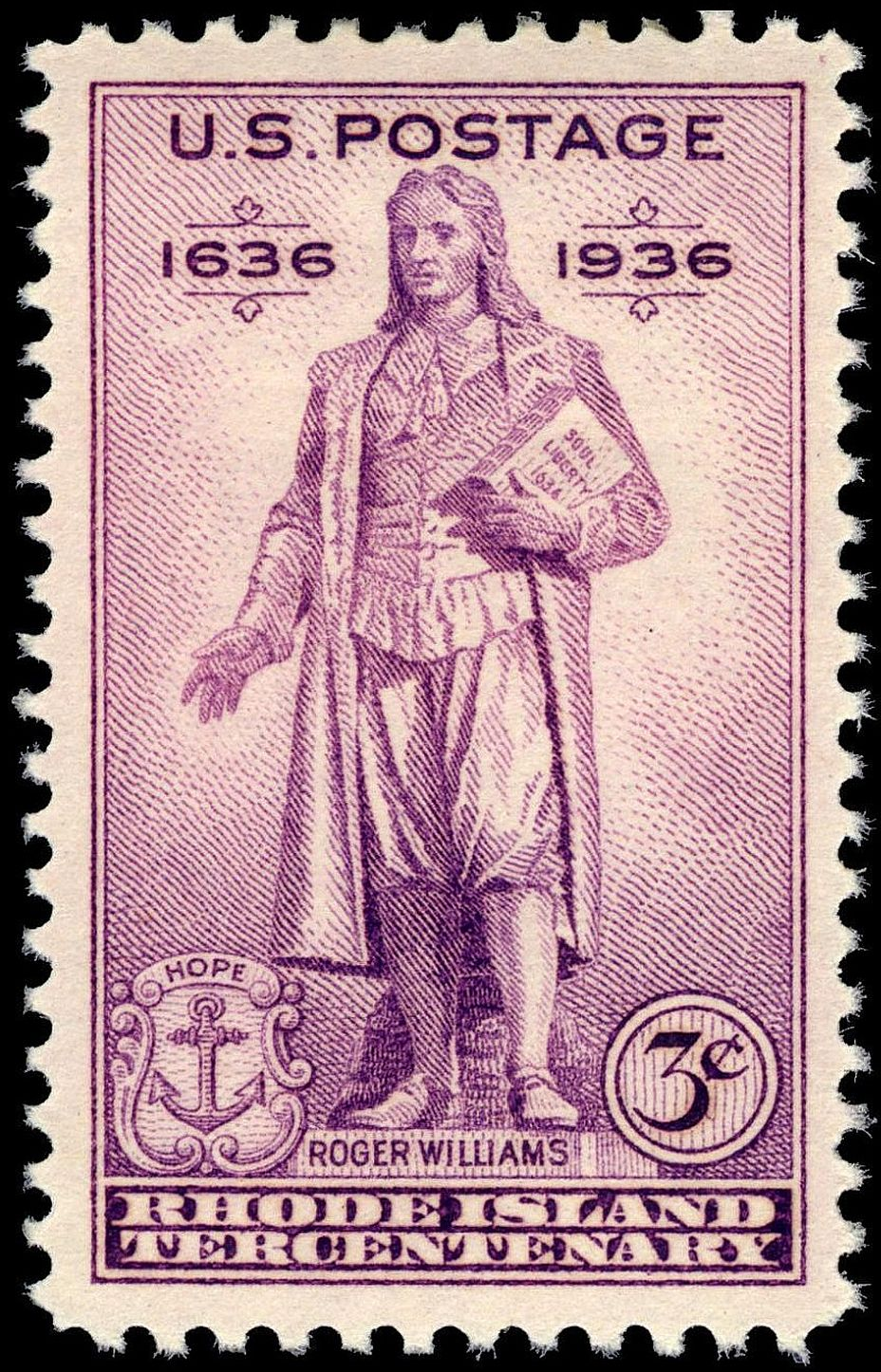
In 1936, on the 300th anniversary of the settlement of Rhode Island in 1636, the U.S. Post Office issued a commemorative stamp, depicting Roger Williams

In 1638, Anne Hutchinson, William Coddington, John Clarke, Philip Sherman, and other religious dissidents settled on Rhode Island after conferring with Williams, forming the settlement of Portsmouth which was governed by the Portsmouth Compact. The southern part of the island became the separate settlement of Newport after disagreements among the founders.

Dissident Samuel Gorton purchased Indian lands at Shawomet in 1642, precipitating a dispute with the Massachusetts Bay Colony. In 1644, Providence, Portsmouth, and Newport united for their common independence as the Colony of Rhode Island and Providence Plantations, governed by an elected council and president. The King of England granted Gorton a separate charter for his settlement in 1648, and Gorton named the settlement Warwick in honor of the Earl of Warwick who had helped him obtain it. These four settlements were finally united into one colony by the Royal Charter of 1663. Critics at the time sometimes referred to it as "Rogue's Island", and Cotton Mather called it "the sewer of New England" because of the colony's willingness to accept people who had been banished from Massachusetts Bay.

Southern Rhode Island was known as Narragansett country and was disputed for nearly 100 years among the colonies of Rhode Island, Connecticut, and Massachusetts. Roger William's charter for Providence Plantations did not include the land of Narragansett Country and Massachusetts and Connecticut both claimed it by right of conquest from the Pequot War. The Narragansetts had pledged their fealty to King Charles, and the area was known as The King's Province and was placed under the authority of Rhode Island "until the King's pleasure was further known".

The Royal Commission of 1664 sent by Charles II stepped in to adjudicate these conflicting claims. The commission extinguished the claims of Massachusetts, and Rhode Island was granted jurisdiction until the commission finished processing Connecticut's appeals. However, due to circumstances, the commission never processed its report and the territory remained in dispute.

In April, 1683, the king commissioned Governor Edward Cranfield of New Hampshire (the highest ranking Crown official in New England), Nathaniel Saltonstall, William Stoughton, and a few other men for the purpose of adjudication of the King's Province or Narragansett country. All of them held strong feelings against the government of Rhode Island.

The commissioners assembled at Smith's Castle, near Wickford, attended by the agents of the Connecticut Colony and Plymouth Colony to litigate their respective claims to the King's Province. Rhode Island peremptorily refused to acknowledge their authority. The legislature ordered a troop of cavalry to prohibit the commissioners from keeping court.

They adjourned to Boston and finally adjudged "that the jurisdiction of the King's Province belonged of right to Connecticut."

Since the dispute was not settled, the King's Province was administered as a separate jurisdiction. The 1688 commission of Edmund Andros as Governor of the Dominion of New England specifically calls out the King's Province separately from Rhode Island.

In 1686, King James II ordered Rhode Island to submit to the Dominion of New England and its appointed governor Edmund Andros. This suspended the Colony's charter, but Rhode Island managed to retain possession of it throughout the brief duration of the Dominion—until Andros was deposed and the Dominion was dissolved. William of Orange became King after the Glorious Revolution of 1688, and Rhode Island's independent government resumed under the 1663 charter—and that charter was used as the state constitution until 1842.

In 1693, William III and Mary II issued a patent extending Rhode Island's territory to three miles "east and northeast" of Narragansett Bay, conflicting with the claims of Plymouth Colony. This resulted in several later transfers of territory between Rhode Island and Massachusetts.

Richard Ward was made a freeman of Newport in 1710, then entered public service as Attorney General, later became Deputy and Clerk of the Assembly, and then served as the General Recorder for the colony from 1714 to 1730.[1] In 1723, he was paid six pounds for attending the trial of a group of pirates who were taken prisoner by Captain Solgar, commander of the British ship Greyhound. Of the 36 pirates taken into captivity, 26 were sentenced to hang, and the execution took place at Newport on July 19, 1723, at a place called Gravelly Point.

In 1726, Ward was one of the four Rhode Island commissioners appointed to meet a group of Connecticut commissioners to settle the boundary line between the two colonies.[1] Ward was the Secretary of State from 1730 to 1733, and in 1740 became the Deputy Governor of the colony. In this capacity he and Samuel Perry were appointed trustees to the Indian sachem Ninigret. In 1741 he was selected as Governor for a single term.

=== Colonial relations with Natives ===
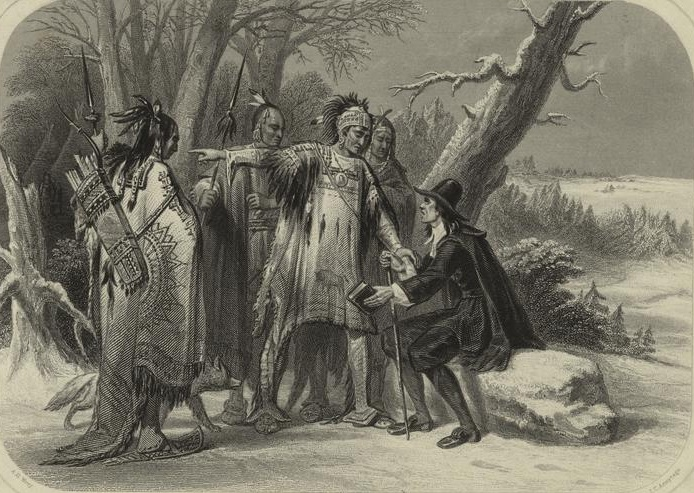
Roger Williams meeting with the Narragansetts

Early relations were mostly peaceful between New Englanders and the Indian tribes. The largest tribes that lived near Rhode Island were the Wampanoags, Pequots, Narragansetts, and Nipmucks. Squanto was a member of the Wampanoag tribe who stayed with the Pilgrims in Plymouth Colony and taught them many valuable skills needed to survive in the area.

Roger Williams won the respect of his Colonial neighbors for his skill in keeping the powerful Narragansetts on friendly terms with the Colonists. In 1637, the Narragansetts formed an alliance with Rhode Island during the Pequot War.

=== King Philip's War ===
However, this peace did not last long, as the most traumatic event in 17th century Rhode Island, indeed all of New England, was King Philip's War (1675–76). Metacomet became the chief of the Wampanoags; he was known as King Philip by the settlers of Portsmouth who had purchased their land from his father Massasoit. He led attacks around Narragansett Bay, despite Rhode Island's continued neutrality, and later these spread throughout New England. A force of Massachusetts, Connecticut, and Plymouth militia under General Josiah Winslow invaded and destroyed the fortified Narragansett Indian village in the Great Swamp in southern Rhode Island on December 19, 1675. The Narragansetts also invaded and burned down several of the Rhode Island settlements, including Providence, although they allowed the population to leave first. In one of the final actions of the war, troops from Connecticut led by Captain Benjamin Church hunted down and killed King Philip at Mount Hope (Rhode Island).

== Revolutionary era, 1775–1790 ==
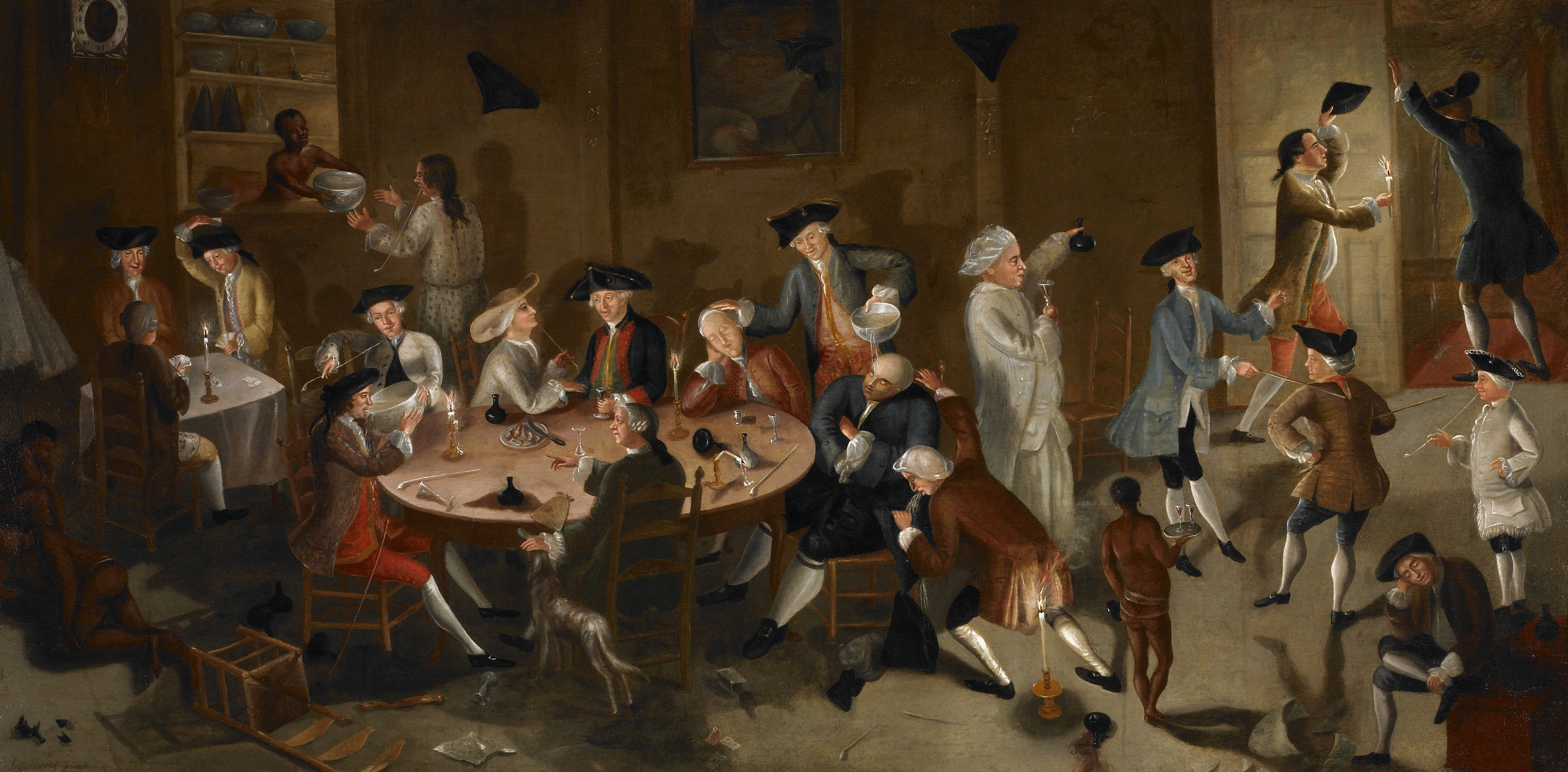
Several prominent Rhode Islanders depicted in Sea Captains Carousing in Surinam (1755–1758)

Rhode Island was the first colony in America to declare independence on May 4, 1776, a full two months before the United States Declaration of Independence. Rhode Islanders had attacked the British warship HMS Gaspee in 1772 as one of the first acts of war leading to the American Revolution. British naval forces under Captain James Wallace controlled Narragansett Bay for much of the Revolutionary War, periodically raiding the islands and the mainland. The British raided Prudence Island for livestock and engaged in a skirmish with American forces, losing approximately a dozen soldiers. Newport remained a hotbed for Loyalist sympathizers who assisted the British forces, so the state appointed General William West of Scituate to root them out in the winter of 1775–76. British forces occupied Newport from 1777 to 1778, pushing American forces to Bristol.

=== Battle of Rhode Island ===
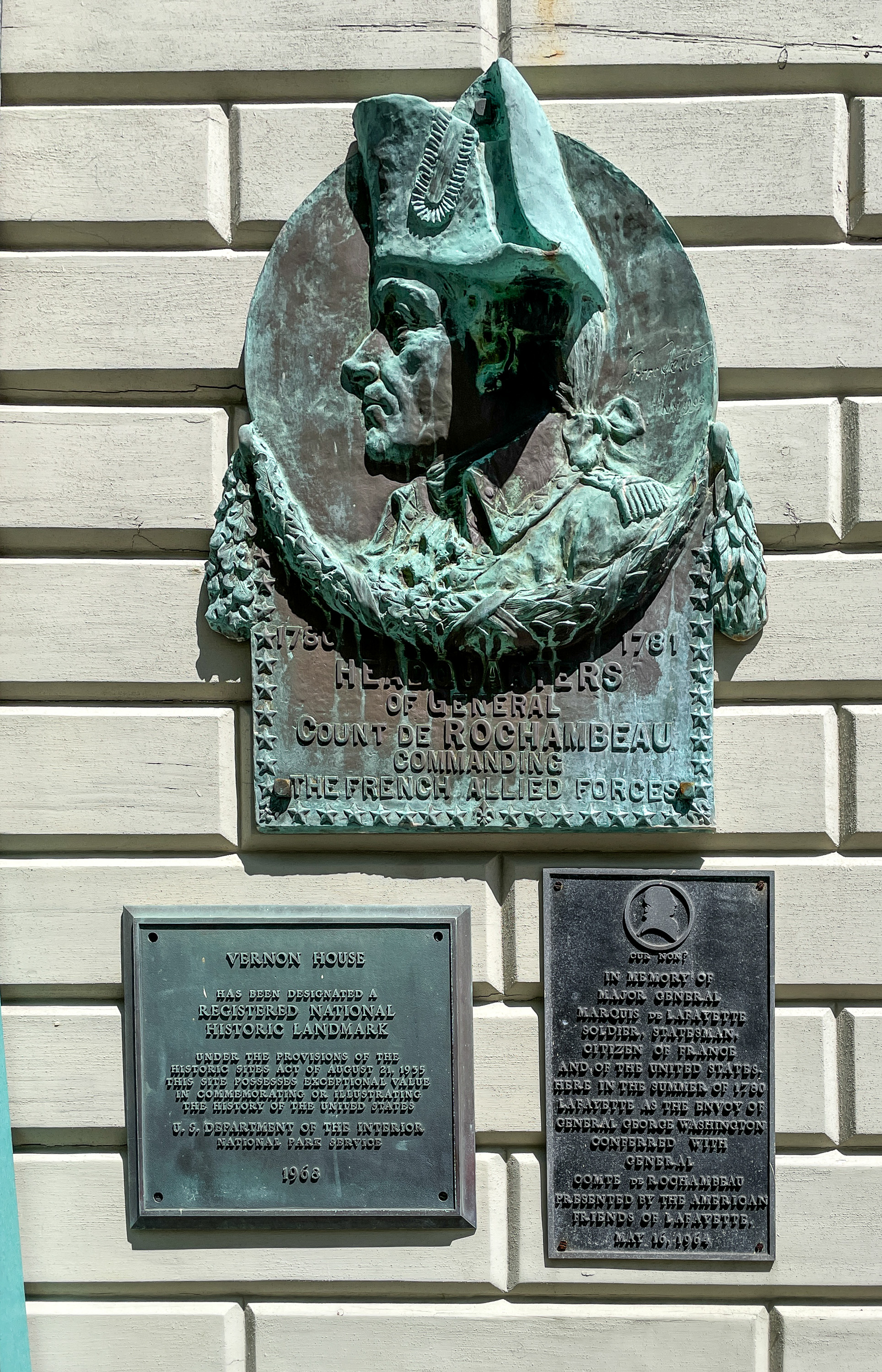
Vernon House served as Rochambeau's headquarters in Newport

The Battle of Rhode Island was fought during the summer of 1778 and was an unsuccessful attempt to expel the British from Narragansett Bay, although few American casualties occurred. The Marquis de Lafayette called the action the "best fought" of the war. The British were forced to concentrate their forces in New York and consequently left Newport. The French under Rochambeau landed in Newport in 1780, and it became the base of the French forces in the United States for the remainder of the war. The French soldiers behaved themselves so well that, in gratitude, the Rhode Island General Assembly repealed an old law banning Catholics from living in Rhode Island. The first Catholic mass in Rhode Island was said in Newport during this time.

Rural resistance to the Constitution was strong in Rhode Island, and the Anti-Federalist Country Party controlled the General Assembly from 1786 to 1790. In 1788, Anti-Federalist politician and Revolutionary War General William West led an armed force of 1,000 troops to Providence to oppose a July 4 celebration of nine states having ratified the Constitution. Civil war was narrowly averted by a compromise limiting the Fourth of July celebration. The State of Rhode Island was the last of the 13 states to ratify the United States Constitution (May 29, 1790), only doing so after being threatened with having its exports taxed as a foreign nation.

=== Slavery in Rhode Island ===
In 1652, the first statute in the Thirteen Colonies banning slavery was passed, but the law was not enforced by the end of the 17th century. In 1703, a law passed by the Rhode Island General Assembly effectively overturned this municipal statute.

According to the 1680 census, there were 175 slaves in Rhode Island, including both native and Black persons.

By 1774, the slave population of Rhode Island was 6.3 percent, nearly twice as high as any other New England colony. In the late 18th century, several Rhode Island merchant families began actively engaging in the triangle trade. James and John DeWolf of Bristol were the largest slave traders in Rhode Island. In the years after the Revolution, Rhode Island merchants controlled between 60 and 90 percent of the American trade of enslaved African people. In the 18th century, Rhode Island's economy depended largely upon the triangle trade; Rhode Islanders distilled rum from molasses, sent the rum to Africa to trade for slaves, and then traded the slaves in the West Indies for more molasses.

At its peak, Rhode Island had the highest percentage of enslaved people in New England, due to the many farms in Washington County. Somewhere between 15% and 25% of the population of Washington County was enslaved.

Stephen Hopkins, a signer of the Declaration of Independence and slave owner, introduced a bill while serving in the Rhode Island Assembly in 1774 that prohibited the importation of slaves into the colony, and this became one of the first anti-slavery laws in the United States. In February 1784, the Rhode Island Legislature passed a compromise measure for gradual emancipation of slaves within the state. All children of slaves born after March 1 were to become apprentices, the girls to become free at 18, the boys at 21. By 1840, the census reported only five former Africans enslaved in Rhode Island. However, the international slave trade continued despite the antislavery laws of 1774, 1784, and 1787. In 1789, an Abolition Society was organized to secure enforcement of existing laws against the trade. Leading merchants continued to engage in the trade even after it became illegal, especially John Brown, for whose family Brown University is named, and George DeWolf, but slaving was no more than a minor aspect of Rhode Island's overall maritime trade after 1770. By the mid-19th century, many Rhode Islanders were active in the abolitionist movement, particularly Quakers in Newport and Providence such as Moses Brown (brother of John).

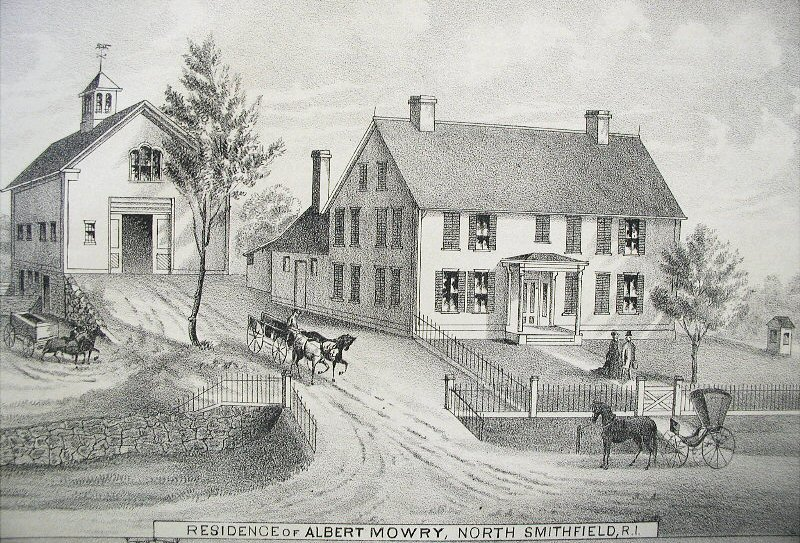
A typical 19th-century Rhode Island farm in North Smithfield

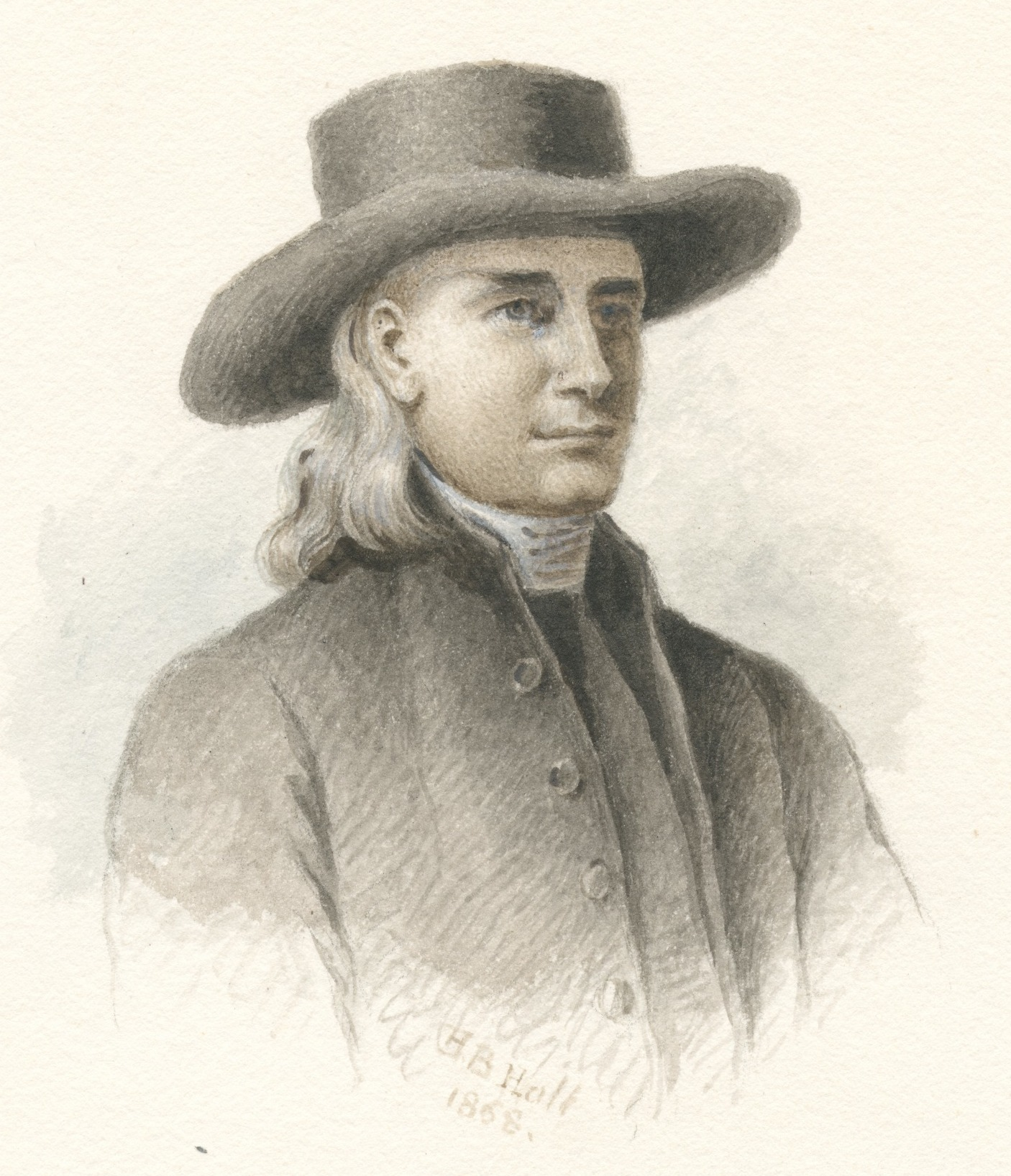
Stephen Hopkins

==== Slave trade in Newport ====
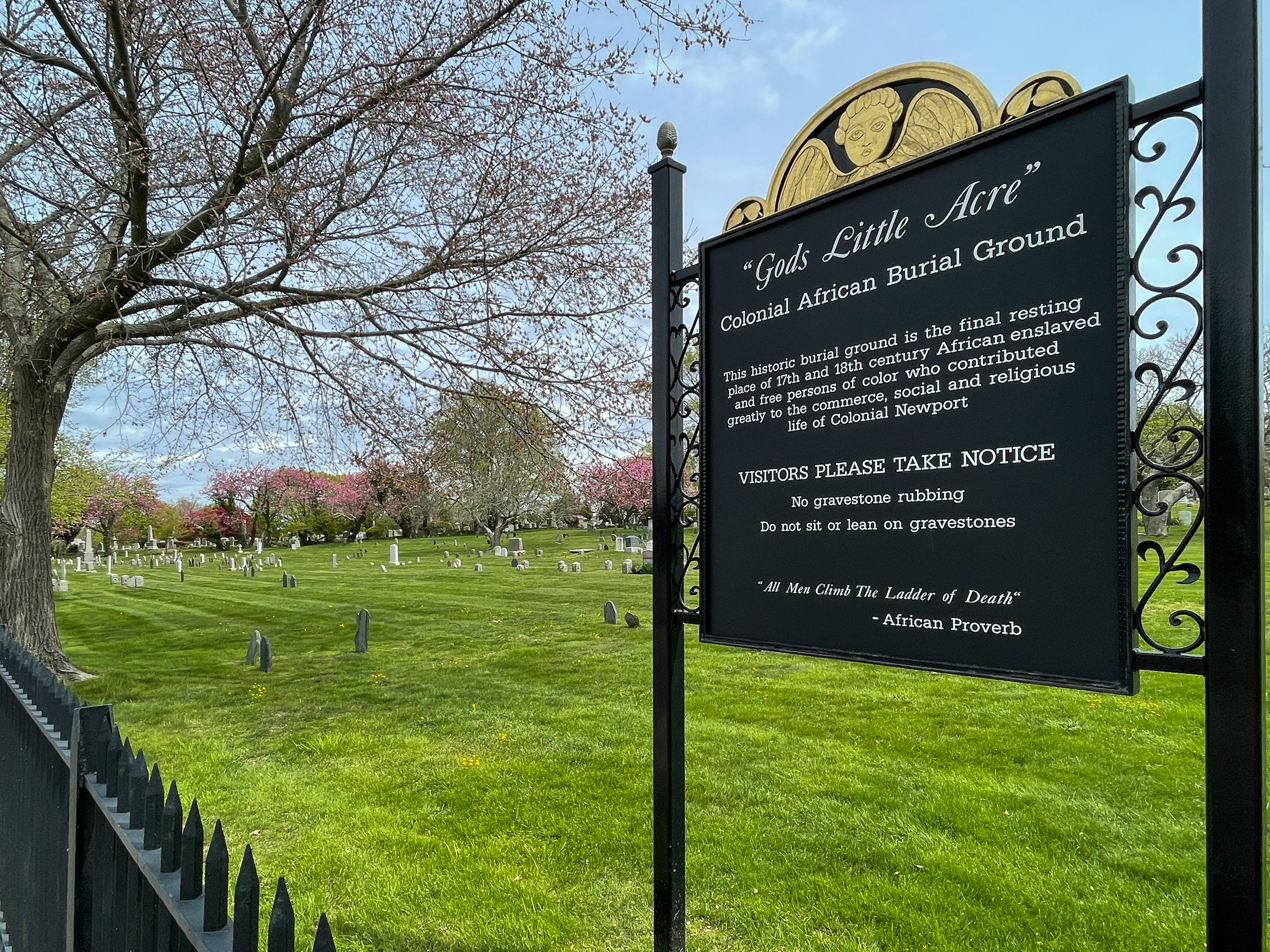
God's Little Acre, the colonial African burial ground in Newport

The first recorded slave ship, the Sea Flower, arrived in Newport in 1696 carrying 47 captives; 14 of them were sold at Newport.

By the early 1700s, Newport was a central player in the triangular slave trade, responsible for about half of slave ship voyages in the colonies. Newport grew both large free black population and a large enslaved population. Free and enslaved Blacks were involved in industries from sail making to rope making and chocolate grinding. The Free African Union Society was America's first African benevolent society, founded in Newport in 1780.

"God's Little Acre", an African-American burial ground in Newport, contains headstones going back to the 1700s.

Rhode Island's Constitution finally emancipated all slaves in 1843 in Section 4, "Slavery shall not be permitted in this state."

== Industrial Revolution ==
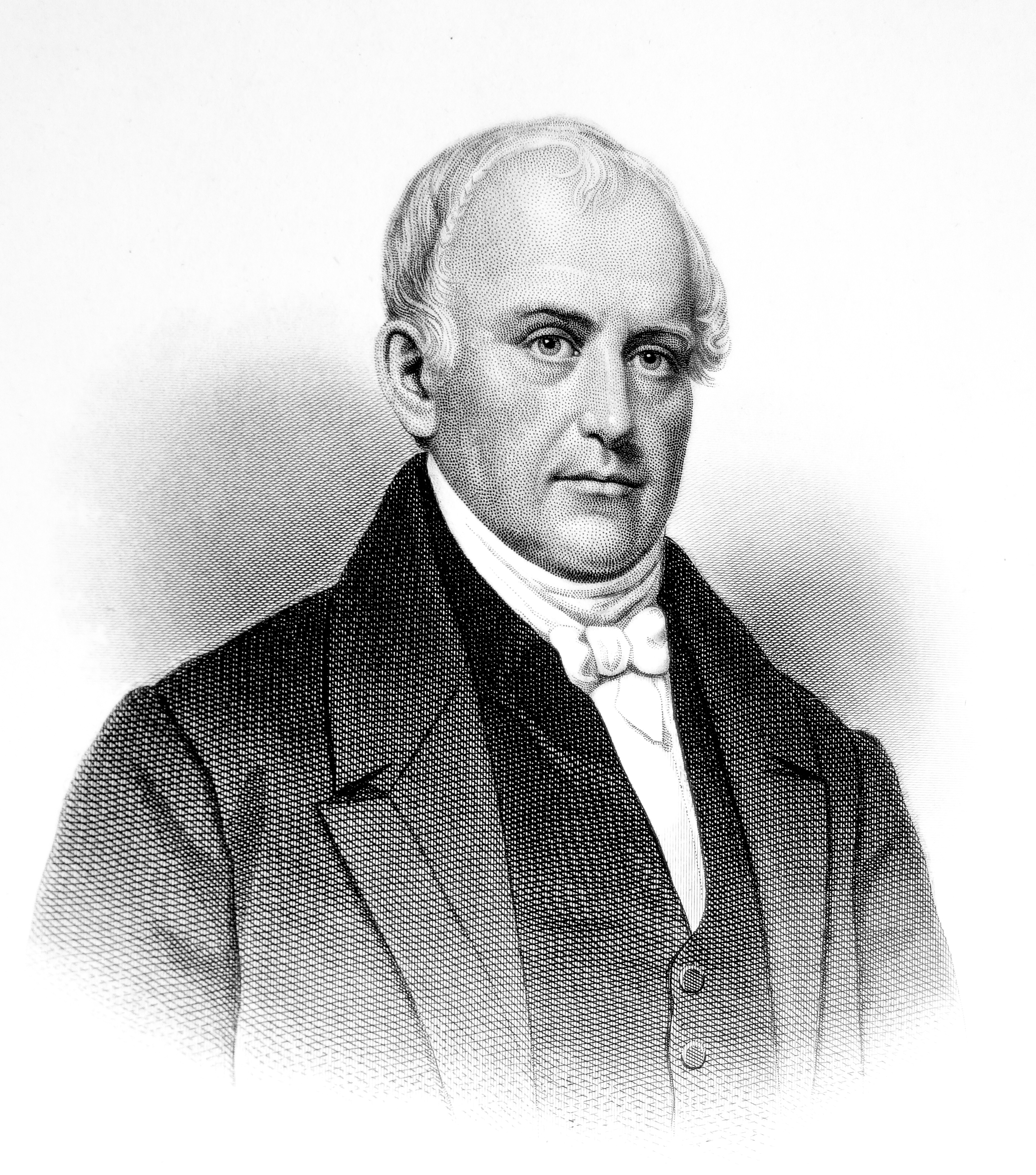
Samuel Slater (1768–1835), popularly called "The Father of the American Industrial Revolution"

In 1790, English immigrant Samuel Slater founded the first textile mill in the United States in Pawtucket, Rhode Island (Slater Mill) and became known as the father of the American Industrial Revolution. During the 19th century, Rhode Island became one of the most industrialized states in America with large numbers of textile factories. The state also had significant machine tool, silverware, and costume jewelry industries. The state's first railroad, the Boston and Providence Railroad, opened in 1835.

The Industrial Revolution moved large numbers of workers into cities and attracted large numbers of immigrants from Ireland, and a landless class developed which was ineligible to vote by Rhode Island law. By 1829, 60-percent of the state's men were ineligible to vote. All efforts at reform failed in the face of rural control of the political system. In 1842, Thomas Dorr drafted a liberal constitution which he tried to ratify by popular referendum. However, conservative Governor Samuel Ward King opposed the constitution, leading to the Dorr Rebellion. The rebellion gained little support and failed, and Dorr went to prison. The conservative elements relented, however, and allowed most American-born men to vote, but the conservative rural towns remained in control of the legislature. The new Constitution of Rhode Island took effect in May 1843.

== Civil War ==
During the American Civil War, Rhode Island furnished 25,236 soldiers to the Union armies, of which 1,685 died. These comprised 12 infantry regiments, three cavalry regiments, and an assortment of artillery and miscellaneous outfits. Rhode Island used its industrial capacity to supply the Union Army with the materials needed to win the war, along with the other northern states. Rhode Island's continued growth and modernization led to the creation of an urban mass transit system and improved health and sanitation programs. In 1866, Rhode Island abolished racial segregation throughout the state. Governor William Sprague IV fought at the First Battle of Bull Run while a sitting governor, and Rhode Island general Ambrose Burnside emerged as one of the major heroes of the war.

== The Gilded Age ==
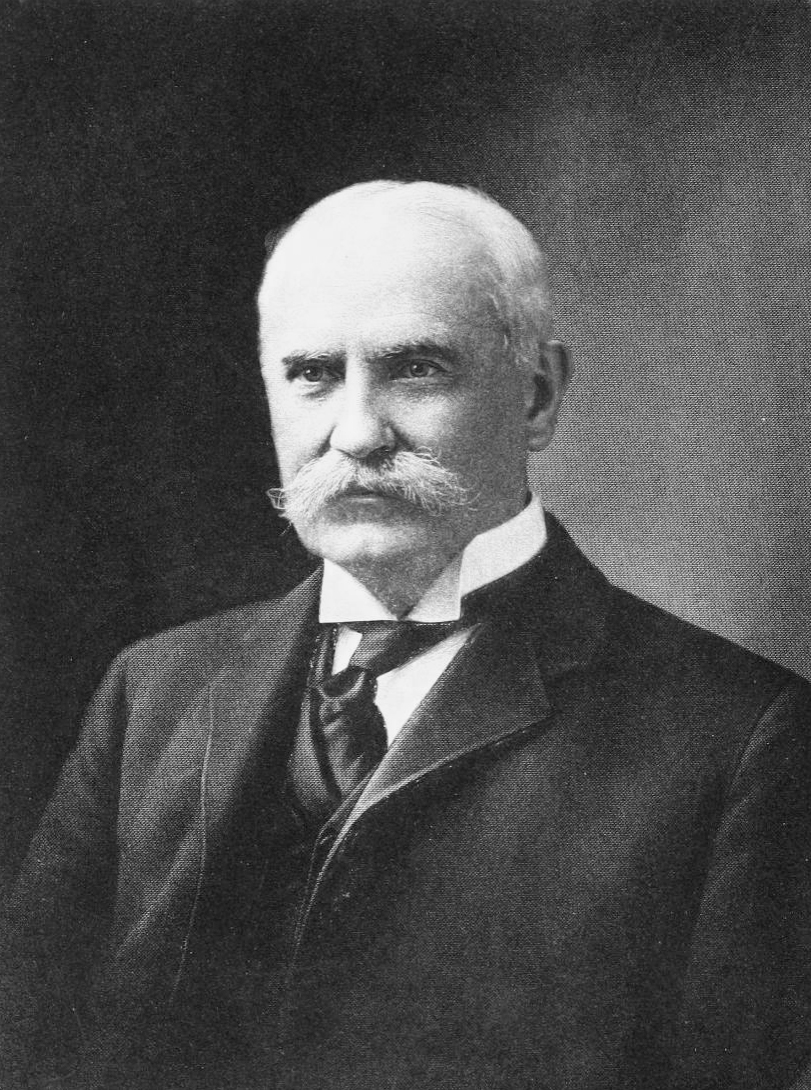
Former Rhode Island senator Nelson W. Aldrich pushed for protectionist tariffs.

The fifty or so years following the Civil War were a time of prosperity and affluence that author William G. McLoughlin called "Rhode Island's halcyon era". Rhode Island was a center of the Gilded Age and provided a home (or summer home) to many of the country's most prominent robber barons. This was a time of incredible growth in textile mills and manufacturing, and saw a huge influx of immigrants to fill those jobs. The state saw increased population growth and urbanization, even as the state denied the growing urban masses access to political power. In politics, the state was dominated by Republicans allied with their mouthpiece newspaper, The Providence Journal. The Journal's editor Henry B. Anthony and his later protégé Nelson Aldrich, along with war hero Ambrose Burnside, all Republicans, dominated politics during this time. Aldrich, as US Senator, became known as the "General Manager of the United States", for his ability to set high tariffs to protect Rhode Island and American goods from foreign competition.

In Newport, New York's wealthiest industrialists created a summer haven to socialize and build ostentatious grand mansions. In Providence, Pawtucket, Central Falls, and Woonsocket, thousands of French-Canadian, Italian, Irish, and Portuguese immigrants arrived to fill jobs in the textile and manufacturing mills. In response, the Know Nothing party, allied with the Republicans and the Providence Journal, sought to exclude these newcomers from the political process. The Constitution of 1843 denied the vote to the landless poor, and ensured that urban centers were disproportionately underrepresented in the state legislature.

Around the start of the 20th century, Rhode Island had a booming economy, which fed the demand for immigration. During World War I, Rhode Island furnished 28,817 troops, of whom 612 died. After the war, the state was hit hard by the Spanish Influenza.

=== Racial hostility ===
In the 1920s and 30s, rural Rhode Island saw a surge in Ku Klux Klan membership, largely among the native-born white population, in reaction to the large waves of immigrants moving to the state. The Klan is believed to be responsible for burning the Watchman Industrial School in Scituate, Rhode Island, which was a school for African-American children.

== Since 1929 ==
In 1935, Governor Theodore Francis Green and Democratic majorities in the state House and Senate replaced a Republican dominance that had existed since the middle of the 19th century in what is termed the "Bloodless Revolution". The Rhode Island Democratic Party has dominated state politics ever since. Since then, the Speaker of the House has always been a Democrat and one of the most powerful figures in government.

The Democratic Party presents itself as a coalition of labor unions, working class immigrants, intellectuals, college students, and the rising ethnic middle class. The Republican Party has been dominant in rural and suburban parts of the state, and has nominated occasional reform candidates who criticize the state's high taxes and excesses of Democratic domination. Cranston Mayors Edward D. DiPrete and Stephen Laffey, Governor Donald Carcieri of East Greenwich, and former Mayor Vincent A. "Buddy" Cianci of Providence ran as Republican reform candidates.

The state income tax was first enacted in 1971 as a temporary measure. Prior to 1971, there was no income tax in the state, but the temporary income tax soon became permanent. The tax burden in Rhode Island remains among the five highest in the United States, including sales, gasoline, property, cigarette, corporate, and capital gains taxes.

A new Constitution of Rhode Island was ratified in 1986 and came into effect on 20 January 1987.

Rhode Islanders have overwhelmingly supported and re-elected Democrats to positions of authority. As of 2020, Rhode Island has heavily Democratic legislatures; both U.S. Senators and Congressmen, and all statewide offices are held by Democrats. The state has been carried by Democratic presidential candidates in every election since 1988.

== Population ==
Historical population
Census	Pop.	Note	%±
1790	68,825		—
1800	69,122		0.4%
1810	76,931		11.3%
1820	83,059		8.0%
1830	97,199		17.0%
1840	108,830		12.0%
1850	147,545		35.6%
1860	174,620		18.4%
1870	217,353		24.5%
1880	276,531		27.2%
1890	345,506		24.9%
1900	428,556		24.0%
1910	542,610		26.6%
1920	604,397		11.4%
1930	687,497		13.7%
1940	713,346		3.8%
1950	791,896		11.0%
1960	859,488		8.5%
1970	946,725		10.1%
1980	947,154		0.0%
1990	1,003,464		5.9%
2000	1,048,319		4.5%
2010	1,052,567		0.4%
2020	1,097,379		4.3%
Source: 1910–2020

== See also ==
- Colony of Rhode Island and Providence Plantations
- History of New England
- List of historical societies in Rhode Island
- List of newspapers in Rhode Island in the 18th century
- Ratification of the United States Constitution by Rhode Island
- Thirteen Colonies
- Timeline of Newport, Rhode Island
- Timeline of Providence, Rhode Island
- Women's suffrage in Rhode Island

Regarding border disputes

- Bristol County, Rhode Island
- History of Connecticut
- History of Massachusetts
- Washington County, Rhode Island

== Bibliography ==
- Aubin, Albert K. (1988). The French in Rhode Island. Rhode Island Heritage Commission.
- Coleman, Peter J. (1963). The Transformation of Rhode Island, 1790–1860. Archived from the original on April 11, 2016 – via Questia.
- Conley, Patrick T. (1988) The Irish in Rhode Island. Rhode Island Heritage Commission.
- Coughtry, Jay A. (1981). The Notorious Triangle: Rhode Island and the African Slave Trade, 1700–1807.
- Crane, Elaine Forman (1992). A Dependent People: Newport, Rhode Island in the Revolutionary Era. Fordham University Press. Archived from the original on April 8, 2016 – via Questia.
- Dennison, George M. (1976). The Dorr War: Republicanism on Trial, 1831–1861. Archived from the original on March 1, 2014 – via Questia.
- Federal Writers' Project, Works Progress Administration (1937). Rhode Island: A Guide to the Smallest State. Boston: Houghton Mifflin Company. Famous guide to state & every town & city.
- Field, Edward (1902). State of Rhode Island and Providence Plantations at the End of the Century: A History. Vol. 1; Vol. 2; Vol. 3.
- Hall, Donald, foreword, Feintuch, Burt and Watters, David H., editors (2005). Encyclopedia of New England. Comprehensive coverage by scholars.
- James, Sidney V. (1975). Colonial Rhode Island: A History.
- Levine, Erwin L. (1963). Theodore Francis Green, The Rhode Island Years. Brown University Press.
- Lockard, Duane (1959). New England State Politics. pp. 172–227. Covers 1932–1958.
- Lovejoy, David (1958). Rhode Island Politics and the American Revolution, 1760–1776. Archived from the original on April 16, 2016 – via Questia.
- McLoughlin, William G. (1986). Rhode Island: A History. The States and the Nation. Excerpt and text search.
- Mayer, Kurt B. (1953) Economic Development and Population Growth in Rhode Island.
- Moakley, Maureen; Cornwell, Elmer (2001). Rhode Island Politics and Government. Archived from the original on October 5, 2018 – via Questia.
- Morse, J. (1797). "Rhode Island". The American Gazetteer. Boston: At the presses of S. Hall, and Thomas & Andrews. OL 23272543M.
- O'Brien, Francis J. (November 2003). Indian Place Names in Rhode Island: Past & Present.
- O'Brien, Francis J. (June 2004). "Bibliography for Studies of American Indians in and Around Rhode Island, 16th–21st Centuries".
- Peirce, Neal R. (1976). The New England States: People, Politics, and Power in the Six New England States. pp. 141–81.
  - Updated in Neal R. Peirce and Jerry Hagstrom (1983). The Book of America: Inside the Fifty States Today. pp. 187–92.
- Peterson, Edward (1853). History of Rhode Island.
- Polishook, Irwin (1969). Rhode Island and the Union.
- Preston, Howard W. (1932). Rhode Island and the Sea. issues 4–5.
- "The Unrightious Traffick: Rhode Island's Slave History", a seven-part 2006 Providence Journal series
- Santoro, Carmela E. (1990). The Italians in Rhode Island: The Age of Exploration to the Present, 1524–1989. Rhode Island Heritage Commission.
- Weeden, William B. (1910). Early Rhode Island: A Social History of the People.
- Withey, Lynne E. (1984). Urban Growth in Colonial Rhode Island: Newport and Providence in the Eighteenth Century.
