= Cabinet of Alabama =

Government body in Alabama, US

The Cabinet of Alabama is a body of the most senior appointed officials of the executive branch of the government of Alabama. Officials are appointed by the governor of Alabama.

== Current officials ==
The cabinet is currently made up of 24 officials, representing different departments.

Cabinet of Alabama
Agency	Name	Date assumed office
Alabama Bureau of Pardons and Paroles	Cam Ward	December 7, 2020
Alabama Department of Veterans Affairs	Jeffrey Newton	March 19, 2025
Alabama Law Enforcement Agency	Hal Taylor	August 11, 2017
Alabama Medicaid Agency	Bo Offord	July 16, 2025
Alabama National Guard	David Pritchett	January 1, 2024
Alabama Office of Civic Engagement	Stacia Robinson	January 1, 2023
Alabama Alcoholic Beverage Control Board	Curtis Stewart	December 9, 2022
Alabama State Banking Department	Mike Hill	July 5, 2016
Alabama Department of Commerce	Ellen McNair	January 1, 2024
Alabama Department of Conservation and Natural Resources	Chris Blankenship	August 11, 2017
Alabama Department of Corrections	John Q. Hamm	January 1, 2022
Alabama Department of Early Childhood Education	Ami Brooks	June 16, 2025
Alabama Department of Economic and Community Affairs	Kenneth Boswell	May 2017
Alabama Department of Finance	Bill Poole	August 1, 2021
Alabama Department of Human Resources	Nancy Buckner	September 2008
Alabama Department of Insurance	Mark Fowler	July 1, 2022
Alabama Department of Mental Health	Kim Boswell	December 16, 2020
Alabama Department of Revenue	Vernon Barnett	May 2017
Alabama Department of Senior Services	Jean Brown	April 15, 2019
Alabama Tourism Department	Lee Sentell	2003
Alabama Department of Transportation	John Cooper	January 17, 2011
Alabama Department of Workforce	Greg Reed	January 1, 2025
Alabama Emergency Management Agency	Jeff Smitherman	May 21, 2022
Alabama Office of Information Technology	Daniel Urquhart	July 1, 2023
