= Disabled parking permits of the United States =

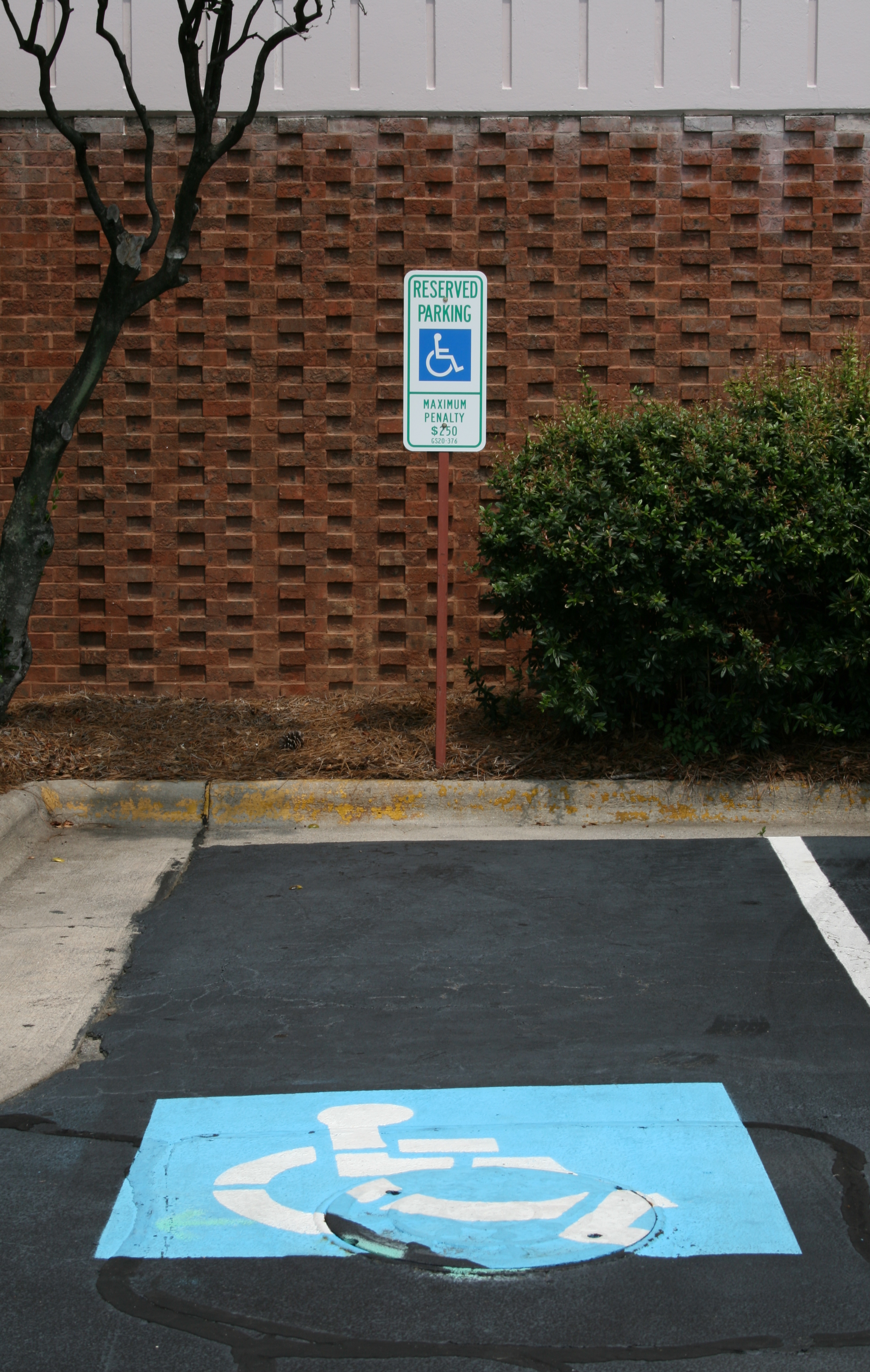
Accessible parking space at the University of North Carolina in Chapel Hill

In the United States, reserved spaces are mandated by the Americans with Disabilities Act Accessibility Guidelines.

== Disabled placards ==
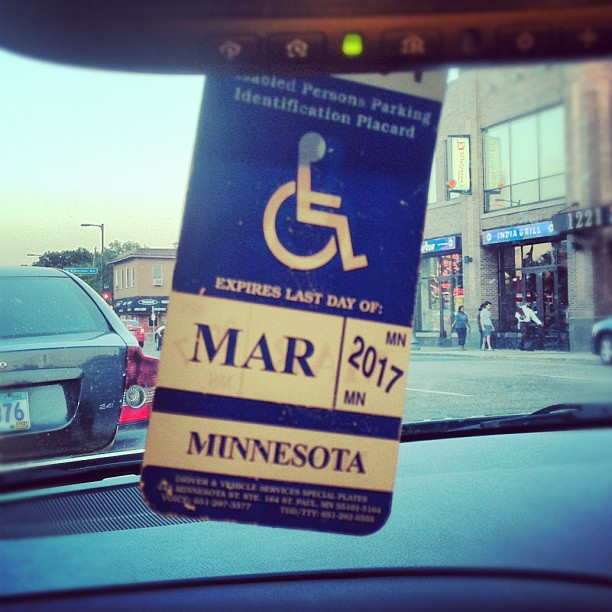
Minnesota permanent placard

The following table, current as of 2020, shows the state agency responsible for issuing disabled parking placards, expiration of permanent/temporary placards, fees (if applicable, though additional and unnoted electronic payment processing and counter fees vary), and supplementary notes. Temporary permits can be issued for a lesser period of time by the recommendation of the physician affirming a driver or passenger's disability.

State agency	Expiration of permanent placards	Expiration of temporary placards (maximum)	Fees	Notes
Alabama Department of Revenue	5 years	6 months	No cost	
Alaska Department of Administration	5 years	6 months	No cost	
Arizona Department of Transportation (ADOT)	None	6 months	No cost	Previously permanent handicap placards expired after 5 years but as of April 2019, these placards do not expire after the passage of a new state law.
Arkansas Department of Finance and Administration	4 years	3 months	No cost	
California Department of Motor Vehicles	2 years	6 months	No cost for permanent; $6 for temporary	
Colorado Department of Revenue	3 years	3 months	No cost	
Connecticut Department of Motor Vehicles	Expires at the same time as drivers license/ID card	6 months	No cost for permanent; $5 for temporary	
District of Columbia Department of Transportation	Expires at the same time as drivers license/ID card	At doctor's discretion	No cost	Expiration of temporary permits is determined with the doctor's discretion.
Delaware Division of Motor Vehicles	3 years	3 months	No cost	
Florida Department of Highway Safety and Motor Vehicles	4 years	6 months	No cost for permanent; $15 for temporary	
Georgia Department of Revenue	4 years	6 months	No cost	
Hawaii Disability and Communication Access Board	6 years	6 months	No cost for permanent; $12 for temporary	Hawaii has delegated issuance of disabled permits to its individual county governments.
Idaho Transportation Department	None	6 months	No cost	
Illinois Secretary of State	None	Varies (see notes)	No cost	Temporary permits expire after 3 months if issued by local municipality or 6 months if issued by the Secretary of State.
Indiana Bureau of Motor Vehicles	None	Varies (see notes)	No cost for permanent; $5 for temporary	Temporary permits expire either after date given by doctor on application or 1 year (whichever is shorter).
Iowa Department of Transportation	5 years	6 months	No cost	
Kansas Department of Revenue	5 years	6 months	No cost	
Kentucky Transportation Cabinet	6 years	3 months	No cost	Renewals or replacement of lost or stolen placards cost $10.
Louisiana Office of Motor Vehicles	4 years	1 year	$3	
Maine Secretary of State	4 years	6 months	No cost	
Maryland Department of Transportation	None	6 months	No cost	
Massachusetts Department of Transportation	5 years	At doctor's discretion	No cost	Expiration of temporary permits is determined by length of time doctor puts on application
Michigan Secretary of State	4 years	6 months	No cost	Renewals or replacement of lost or stolen placards cost $10.
Minnesota Department of Public Safety	6 years	6 months	No cost for permanent; $5 for temporary	
Mississippi Department of Revenue	5 years	6 months	No cost	
Missouri Department of Revenue	4 years	6 months	No cost for permanent; $2 for temporary	
Montana Department of Justice	3 years	6 months	No cost	Permanent placards issued prior to October 1993 do not require renewal.
Nebraska Department of Motor Vehicles	6 years	Varies (see notes)	No cost	Temporary placards expire after either 3 or 6 months as determined by doctor's discretion
Nevada Department of Motor Vehicles	10 years	Varies (see notes)	No cost	Temporary placards in Nevada come in two varieties: temporary (valid for 6 months) and moderate (valid for up to 2 years)
New Hampshire Department of Safety	5 years	6 months	No cost	Permanent placards expire at the same time as drivers license or ID card, so first placard may expire in less than 5 years but subsequent placards will expire in 5 years.
New Jersey Motor Vehicles Commission	3 years	6 months	No cost for permanent; $4 for temporary	
New Mexico Motor Vehicles Department	4 years	12 months	No cost	
New York Department of Motor Vehicles	See notes	6 months	No cost	Permanent placards expire at the discretion of the issuing agency (village, town, city).
North Carolina Department of Transportation	5 years	6 months	$5 each for permanent and temporary (limited to 2 placards)	
North Dakota Department of Transportation	3 years	3 months	No cost for permanent; $3 for temporary	
Ohio Bureau of Motor Vehicles	5 years	6 months	$5 for permanent and temporary	
Oklahoma Department of Motor Vehicles	5 years	6 months	No cost	
Oregon Department of Motor Vehicles	8 years	6 months	No cost	
Pennsylvania Department of Transportation (PennDOT)	5 years	6 months	No cost	
Rhode Island Department of Revenue	3+ years	Varies (see notes)	No cost	In Rhode Island, temporary placards come in two varieties: temporary (valid up to 12 months) and long-term (valid from 1-3 years)
South Carolina Department of Motor Vehicles	4 years	12 months	$1 for permanent and temporary	
South Dakota Department of Transportation	5 years	12 months	No cost	
Tennessee Department of Revenue	2 years	6 months	$26.50 and $3 renewal for permanent and $10 and $10 renewal for temporary	No charge for permanent placard if vehicle registration is in applicant's name, however $3 renewal charge still applies; $2 charge for replacement placards
Texas Department of Transportation	4 years	6 months	No cost for permanent; $5 for temporary	
Utah State Tax Commission	2 years	6 months	No cost	
Vermont Agency of Transportation	4 years	6 months	No cost	
Virginia Department of Motor Vehicles	5 years	6 months	$5 for permanent and temporary	$5 for replacement placards
Washington Department of Licensing	5 years	12 months	No cost	
West Virginia Department of Transportation	5 years	6 months	No cost	
Wisconsin Department of Transportation (WisDOT)	4 years	6 months	No cost for permanent; $6 for temporary	
Wyoming Department of Transportation (WYDOT)	10 years	6 months	No cost	

== Disabled plates ==
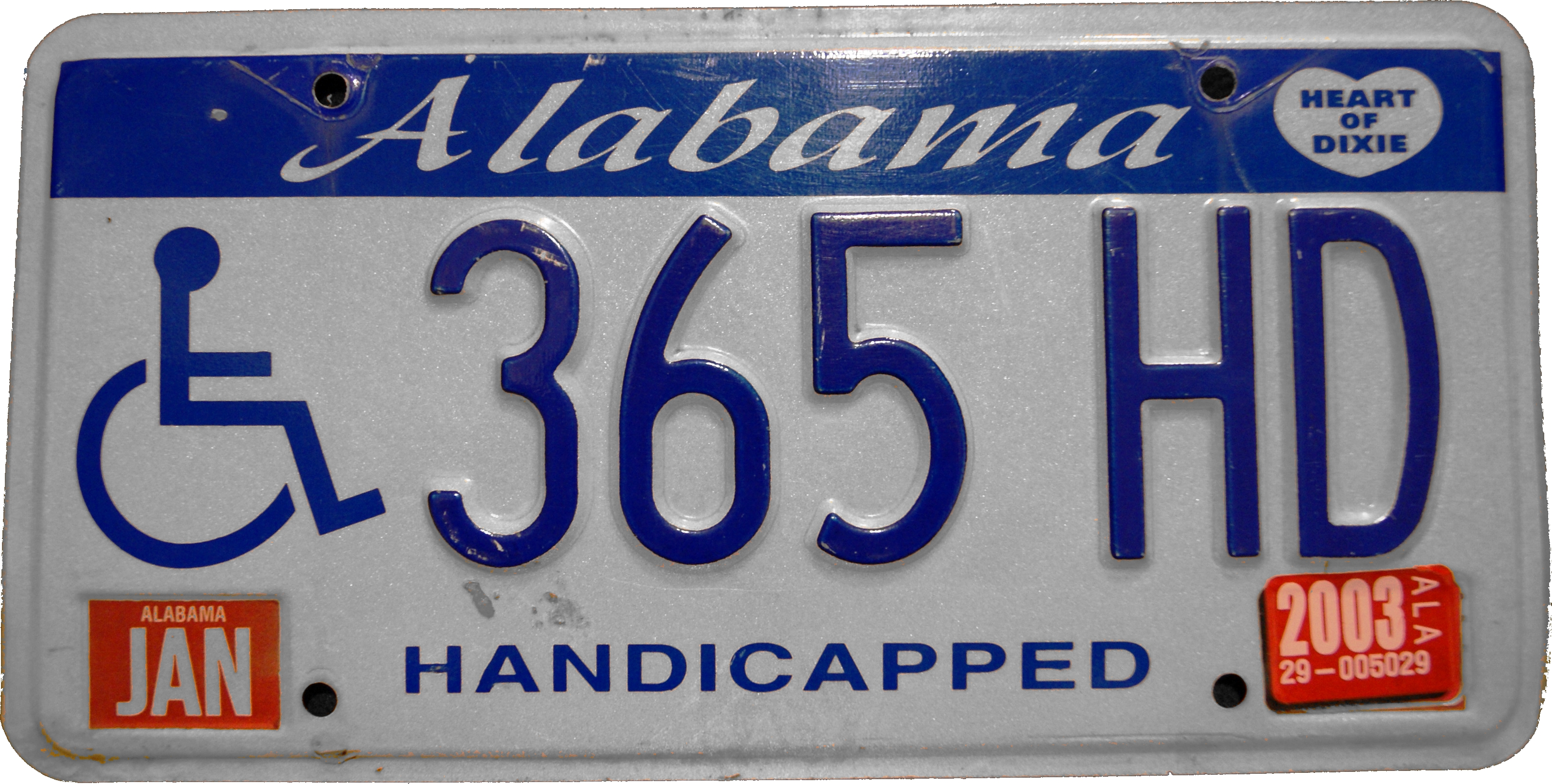
Alabama disabled plate

The following table, current as of 2020, shows the state agency responsible for issuing disabled plates, length of validity of registration for plates and/or any renewal requirements (if applicable), fees (either regular automotive registration fees and/or any fees charged beyond regular automotive registration fees), fee amounts if assessed beyond regular automotive registration fees (if applicable), and supplementary notes.

State agency	Length of validity on plates	Fees	Additional fees beyond regular registration?	Notes
Alabama Department of Revenue	5 years renewal	$23-105, depending on type of vehicle registered	N/A	
Alaska Department of Administration	5 years	No cost (see notes)	N/A	First set of plates is free, but additional set of plates (or commercial plates) cost $100 in registration fees plus applicable motor vehicle registration taxes.
Arizona Department of Transportation (ADOT)	Valid as long as renewed regularly (either 1 or 2 years depending on driver's choice)	Payment of regular registration fees	N/A	
Arkansas Department of Finance and Administration	1 year	Payment of regular registration fees	N/A	
California Department of Motor Vehicles	Valid as long as renewed regularly	Payment of regular registration fees	N/A	
Colorado Department of Revenue	3 years	3 months	No cost	
Connecticut Department of Motor Vehicles	Expires at the same time as drivers license/ID card	6 months	No cost for permanent; $5 for temporary	
District of Columbia Department of Transportation	Expires at the same time as drivers license/ID card	At doctor's discretion	No cost	Expiration of temporary permits is determined by length of time doctor puts on application
Delaware Division of Motor Vehicles	3 years	3 months	No cost	
Florida Department of Highway Safety and Motor Vehicles	4 years	6 months	No cost for permanent; $15 for temporary	
Georgia Department of Revenue	4 years	6 months	No cost	
Hawaii Disability and Communication Access Board	6 years	6 months	No cost for permanent; $12 for temporary	Hawaii has delegated issuance of disabled permits to the City and County of Honolulu, as well as the counties of Hawaii, Kauaʻi and Maui.
Idaho Transportation Department	None	6 months	No cost	
Illinois Secretary of State	None	Varies (see notes)	No cost	Temporary permits expire after 3 months if issued by local municipality or 6 months if issued by the Secretary of State.
Indiana Bureau of Motor Vehicles	None	Varies (see notes)	No cost for permanent; $5 for temporary	Temporary permits expire either after date given by doctor on application or 1 year (whichever is shorter).
Iowa Department of Transportation	5 years	6 months	No cost	
Kansas Department of Revenue	5 years	6 months	No cost	
Kentucky Transportation Cabinet	6 years	3 months	No cost	Renewals or replacement of lost or stolen placards cost $10.
Louisiana Office of Motor Vehicles	4 years	1 year	$3	
Maine Secretary of State	4 years	6 months	No cost	
Maryland Department of Transportation	None	6 months	No cost	
Massachusetts Department of Transportation	5 years	At doctor's discretion	No cost	Expiration of temporary permits is determined by length of time doctor puts on application
Michigan Secretary of State	4 years	6 months	No cost	Renewals or replacement of lost or stolen placards cost $10.
Minnesota Department of Public Safety	6 years	6 months	No cost for permanent; $5 for temporary	
Mississippi Department of Revenue	5 years	6 months	No cost	
Missouri Department of Revenue	4 years	6 months	No cost for permanent; $2 for temporary	
Montana Department of Justice	3 years	6 months	No cost	Permanent placards issued prior to October 1993 do not require renewal.
Nebraska Department of Motor Vehicles	6 years	Varies (see notes)	No cost	Temporary placards expire after either 3 or 6 months as determined by doctor's discretion
Nevada Department of Motor Vehicles	10 years	Varies (see notes)	No cost	Temporary placards in Nevada come in two varieties: temporary (valid for 6 months) and moderate (valid for up to 2 years)
New Hampshire Department of Safety	5 years	6 months	No cost	Permanent placards expire at the same time as drivers license or ID card, so first placard may expire in less than 5 years but subsequent placards will expire in 5 years.
New Jersey Motor Vehicles Commission	3 years	6 months	No cost for permanent; $4 for temporary	
New Mexico Motor Vehicles Department	4 years	12 months	No cost	
New York Department of Motor Vehicles	See notes	6 months	No cost	Permanent placards expire at the discretion of the issuing agency (village, town, city).
North Carolina Department of Transportation	5 years	6 months	$5 each for permanent and temporary (limited to 2 placards)	
North Dakota Department of Transportation	3 years	3 months	No cost for permanent; $3 for temporary	
Ohio Bureau of Motor Vehicles	5 years	6 months	$5 for permanent and temporary	
Oklahoma Department of Motor Vehicles	5 years	6 months	No cost	
Oregon Department of Motor Vehicles	8 years	6 months	No cost	
Pennsylvania Department of Transportation (PennDOT)	5 years	6 months	No cost	
Rhode Island Department of Revenue	3+ years	Varies (see notes)	No cost	In Rhode Island, temporary placards come in two varieties: temporary (valid up to 12 months) and long-term (valid from 1-3 years)
South Carolina Department of Motor Vehicles	4 years	12 months	$1 for permanent and temporary	
South Dakota Department of Transportation	5 years	12 months	No cost	
Tennessee Department of Revenue	2 years	6 months	$26.50 and $3 renewal for permanent and $10 and $10 renewal for temporary	No charge for permanent placard if vehicle registration is in applicant's name, however $3 renewal charge still applies; $2 charge for replacement placards
Texas Department of Transportation	4 years	6 months	No cost for permanent; $5 for temporary	
Utah State Tax Commission	2 years	6 months	No cost	
Vermont Agency of Transportation	4 years	6 months	No cost	
Virginia Department of Motor Vehicles	5 years	6 months	$5 for permanent and temporary	$5 for replacement placards
Washington Department of Licensing	5 years	12 months	No cost	
West Virginia Department of Transportation	5 years	6 months	No cost	
Wisconsin Department of Transportation (WisDOT)	4 years	6 months	No cost for permanent; $6 for temporary	
Wyoming Department of Transportation (WYDOT)	10 years	6 months	No cost	

== Disabled parking space requirements ==
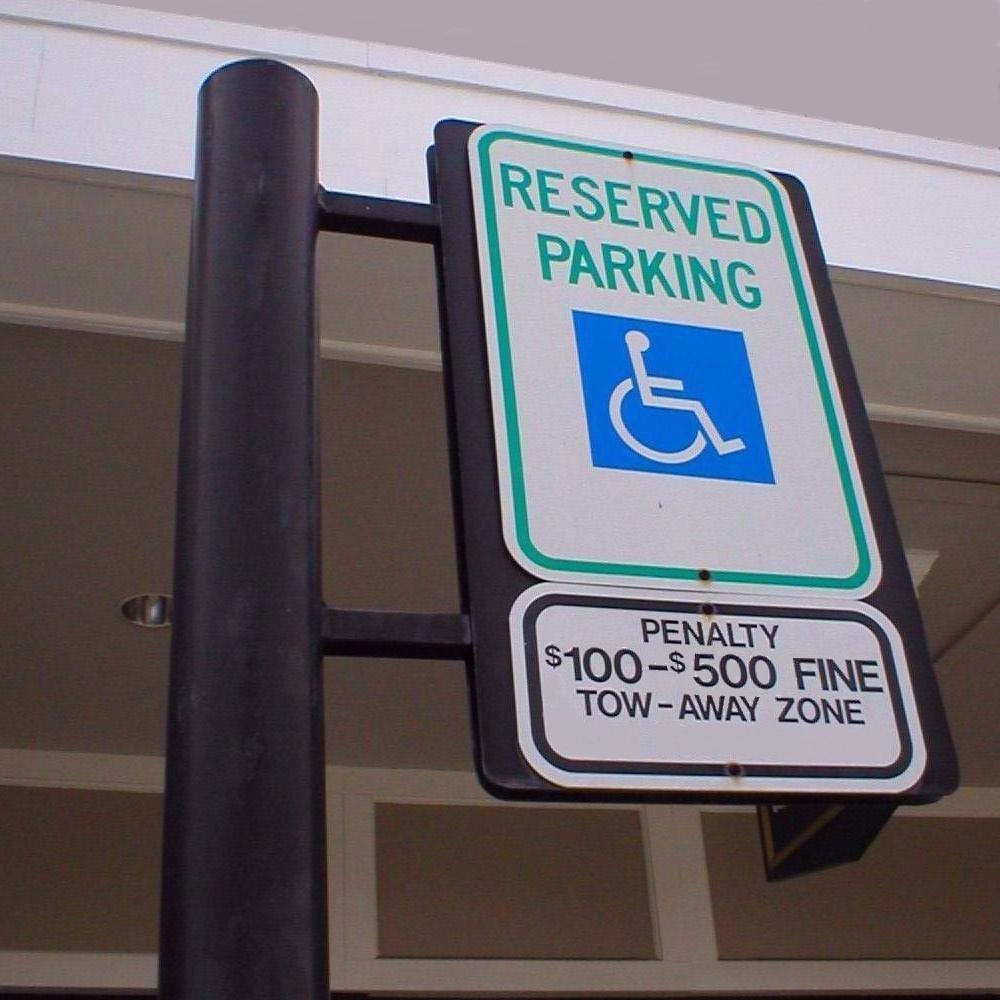
Indicates parking is restricted to users with handicapped tag (plate) or placard

According to the Americans With Disabilities Act Handbook, "Accessible parking spaces should be at least 96 in (2440 mm) wide. Parking access aisles shall be part of an accessible route to the building or facility entrance..."

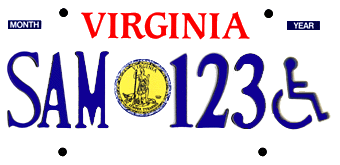
Example of a disability license plate (Virginia plate shown)

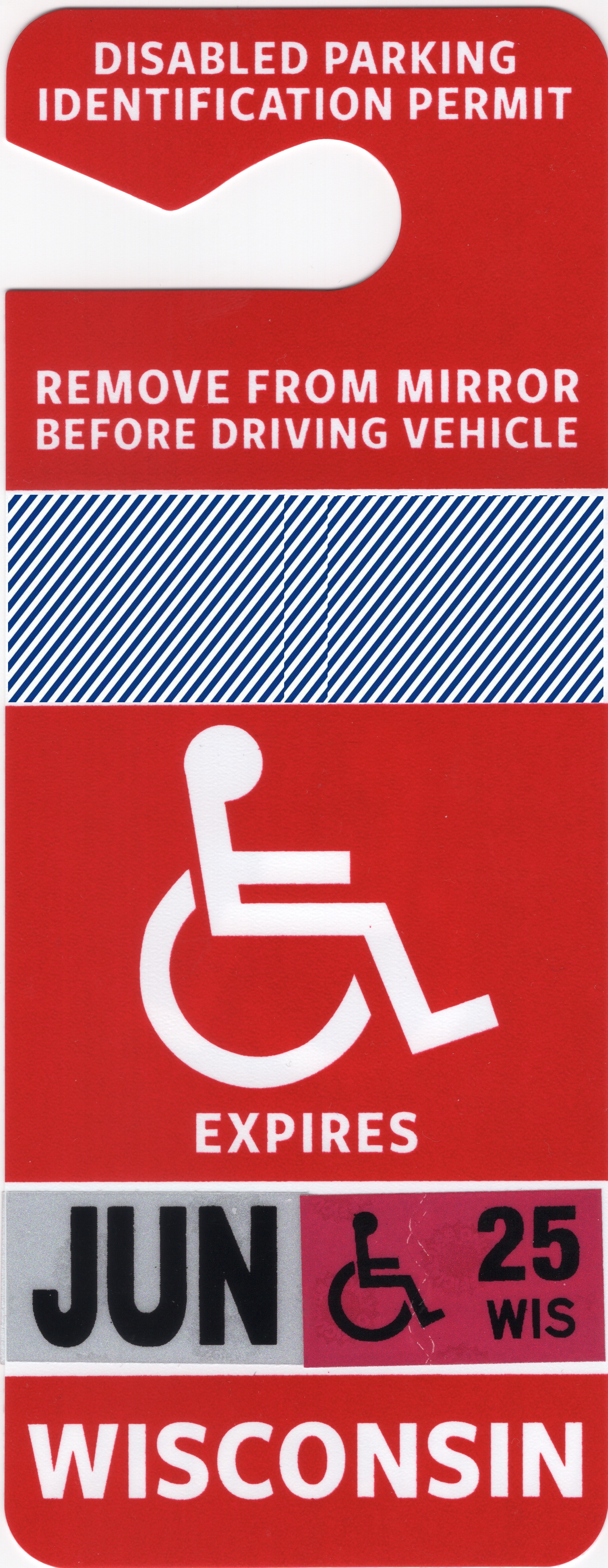
A temporary disability placard in red, usually issued to someone with a temporary disability, issued by Wisconsin.

Disabled parking permits generally take the form of either specially marked license plates or a placard that hangs from the rear-view mirror. Plates are generally used for disabled drivers on their personal vehicle, while the portable disability placard can be moved from one vehicle to another with the disabled person, both when driving or when riding with another driver.

The medical requirements to obtain a permit vary by state, but are usually confined to specific types of disabilities or conditions. These as a general rule include the use of any assistive device such as a wheelchair, crutches, or cane, as well as a missing leg or foot. Some states also include certain cardiovascular, pain, or respiratory conditions. About half of US states (26) include blindness as a qualifying disability enabling the person to obtain a disability parking permit for use as a passenger, and 14 states include a disabled hand as a qualifying disability. Four states include deafness (Georgia, Kentucky, Virginia, Wyoming), and two states (Virginia and New York) include mental illness or developmental disabilities as qualifying disabilities.

Disability parking placards come in various colors with the significance varying from state to state. The most common are red for temporary placards and blue for permanent ones.

California state law requires every parking lot or garage to display a sign warning that unauthorized vehicles will be towed from disabled parking spaces.

The availability of specially reserved parking spaces is regulated by both federal and state laws. Generally at least one space is available at any public parking location, with more being required based on the size of the parking lot and in some cases the type of location, such as a health care facility. Parking spaces reserved for disabled people are typically marked with the International Symbol of Access, though in practice, the design of the symbol varies widely. Often, the parking space is delineated with blue lines instead of the white or yellow lines used elsewhere in the lot. Anyone parking in such reserved spaces must have their disability plate or mirror placard displayed, or else the car can be ticketed for illegal parking. In some major US cities, local law also allows such vehicles to park for free at city parking meters and also exempts from time limits on time parked. In the US states of California, Illinois, Maryland, Massachusetts, South Carolina, Texas, Utah, and Virginia, holders of a Disabled parking permit are exempt from parking meter fees (in Illinois, only disabled drivers who meet specific criteria are eligible for free parking). In some states (including Virginia) accessible-designated parking meters exist, which, unless the permit holder is exempt, must be paid at the same rate as non-designated meters. One will also be subject to receiving a violation ticket if a valid disability license plate or placard is not displayed on the vehicle. Fraudulent use of another person's placard is heavily fined.

If traveling from other countries, requirements to obtain a parking permit vary from state to state. Some states will honor other country permits, while others require application as a visitor/tourist.

Canada's provinces will honor a US state issued disabled plate or placard since US states will honor Canadian disabled plates and placards.

In all types of dwellings, United States federal law states that it is unlawful and discriminatory to refuse services that may assist in making reasonable accommodations for those with disabilities. This includes any services or facilities that are necessary in order for the occupant to inhabit their dwelling as deemed standard.

== Integration with electric vehicle charging ==
In California alone, there are over 27,000 Plug in Electric Vehicles (PEV) with about 2,000 being added every month. While most PEV charging is done at home, the public charging infrastructure is also expanding, with 6,218 public charging stations as of July 2013. Although the number of PEVs is still a small portion of the cars on the road, and the number of PEVs with Handicap placards is much smaller still, the needs of handicap PEV drivers must be integrated with public charging spaces. Guidelines are that 1 in 25 PEV Charging Stations be made ADA space compliant. Although not intuitively obvious, it's important to recognize that a PEV charging station is not parking space, rather a charging service, in the same manner that gas station fill up spots are not parking spaces. Electric vehicle charging stations that meet the ADA space requirements are not to be reserved exclusively for the use of persons with disabilities, they are shared by any PEV needing to charge. Further more any PEV charging space, ADA space compliant or not, cannot be used by non-PEV vehicles, including those with handicap placards. Recommended signage, along with common courtesy, ask that ADA space compliant charging stations are to be used last.

== Abuse ==
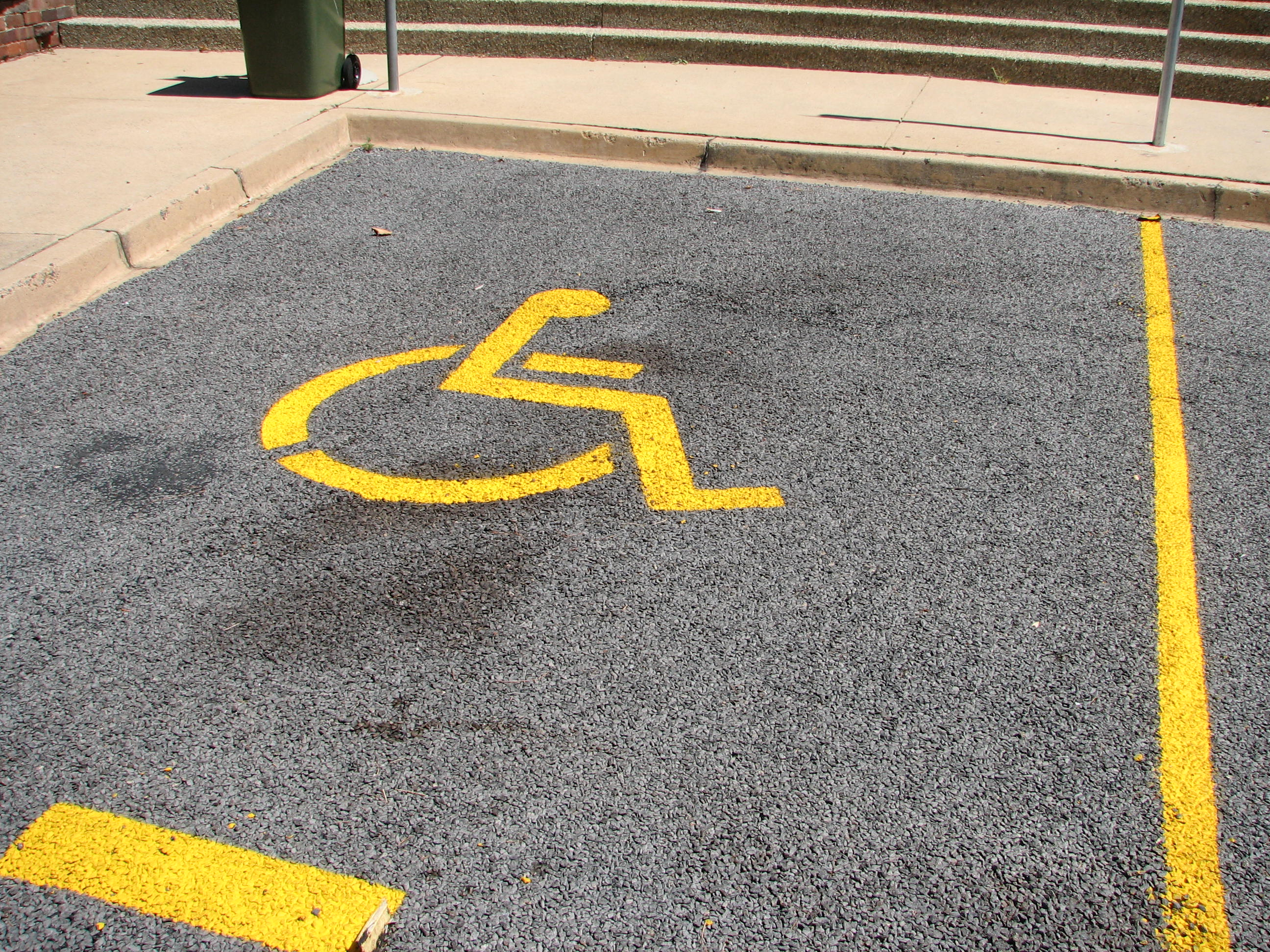
An example of a disabled parking place.

The abuse and misuse of disabled parking permits has been identified as a major problem in the US, with some estimates indicating the majority seen on the street are used or obtained fraudulently. The substantial privilege and convenience granted by a permit provides a major incentive to use one illegally or obtain one fraudulently, and medical privacy law often confounds attempts to identify truly disabled individuals from abuses. In 1999, for example, 19 of UCLA's current and former football players were charged with abuse of disabled parking placards. In 2013 a news program in Los Angeles filmed people using disabled parking placards outside a health club, including one of the health club's celebrity instructors and young adults with the placard of a 77-year-old.

Abuse occurs under the following circumstances:

- A non-disabled driver using the vehicle, plate or placard of another person who is disabled without transporting that person. This often occurs with family members of disabled people.
- Using an illegally purchased placard that originally was issued to another person.
- Forging a physician's signature on the form submitted to the motor vehicle department.
- Feigning or exaggerating symptoms of a medical condition in order to convince a physician to submit the form.

A related issue is physician approval of permits for medical conditions that do not actually qualify under that jurisdiction's requirements. Often this is simply an error on the physician's part due to not fully understanding the law. A common example is cognitive, psychiatric, or developmental conditions (such as autism), which in all but two states do not qualify for a permit. Such permits are still legal and valid, and most recipients honestly believe they have a qualifying disability. The result is far more permits than existing parking spaces can usually support, which often leaves more severely disabled individuals without a place to park.

Disabled persons who hold parking permits but have invisible disabilities may be difficult to tell apart from fraudulent permit users. On occasion, suspicion of fraud has led to hostility against legitimate permit holders.

== New York City ==
Disabled drivers from outside New York City who possess state-issued disability parking permits have claimed illegal discrimination and civil rights violations on the part of New York City. In 1991 a disabled elderly man from New Jersey was issued a ticket while parking in Brooklyn while displaying his New Jersey-issued disability parking placard. In 1997 a woman with multiple sclerosis using a wheelchair was similarly issued a ticket while parking in New York City for displaying a non-NYC issued disability parking placard. Both drivers maintain that failure to recognize non-NYC disability parking placards is a violation of their civil rights.

The city does recognize valid placards from other jurisdictions for marked disabled parking spaces, all of which are in off-street lots.

== See also ==
- Disabled parking permit
- Adapted automobile
- Parking violation
