= Governor of Rhode Island =

Head of government of the U.S. state of Rhode Island

Governor of the State of Rhode Island
- Seal of the governor

- Flag of the governor

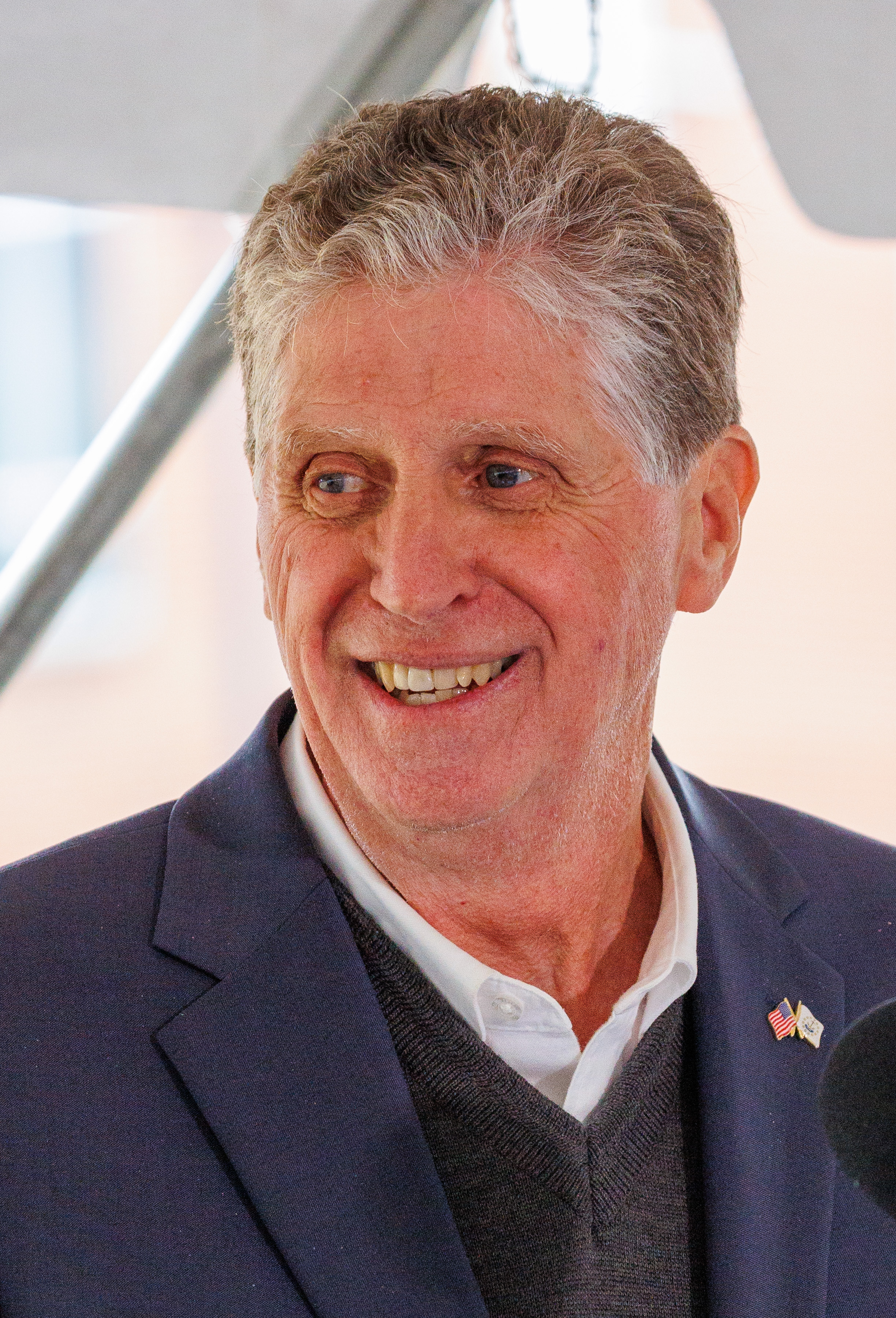
- Incumbent; Dan McKee since March 2, 2021
- Government of Rhode Island
- Style: Governor (informal); The Honorable (formal)
- Type: Head of state Head of government
- Member of: Cabinet
- Residence: None official
- Seat: State House, Providence, Rhode Island
- Nominator: Primary election
- Appointer: Popular vote
- Term length: Four years; renewable once consecutively
- Constituting instrument: Constitution of Rhode Island
- Formation: Original form: June 1636; Current form: November 1775
- Succession: Line of succession
- Deputy: Lieutenant Governor of Rhode Island
- Salary: $145,754.96 (2020)
- Website: Official website

The governor of Rhode Island is the head of government of the U.S. state of Rhode Island and serves as commander-in-chief and Captain-General of the state's Army National Guard and Air National Guard. The current governor is Dan McKee, a member of the Democratic Party. In their capacity as commander of the national guard, the governor of Rhode Island also has the title of captain general. Rhode Island is one of the few states that currently does not have a governor's mansion or other official residence.

== Qualifications ==
The following are the requirements to be elected Governor of Rhode Island:

- Be at least eighteen years of age
- Be a resident of the State of Rhode Island for at least thirty days
- Be a registered voter in Rhode Island

== Constitutional authority and responsibilities ==
Section I, Article IX of the Rhode Island Constitution reads,

Power vested in governor. – The chief executive power of this state shall be vested in a governor, who, together with a lieutenant governor, shall be elected by the people.

The Governor of Rhode Island is elected every four years and is limited to two consecutive terms. As the chief executive of the Government of Rhode Island, the governor is supported by a number of elected general officers and appointed directors of state agencies.

Responsibilities granted to the governor by the Rhode Island Constitution include the position of commander-in-chief of all components of the Rhode Island National Guard, so long as they remain un-federalized by the president of the United States, and the responsibility to submit the annual state budget to the Rhode Island General Assembly.

The governor also has the power to grant pardons and veto bills, resolutions and votes subject to a two-thirds override.

== Party affiliation ==
Number of governors of Rhode Island by party affiliation
Party	Governors
Republican	32
Democratic	22
Democratic-Republican	4
Independent	4
Whig	4
Country	3
Law and Order	2
Dorr Rebellion	1
Federalist	1
Know Nothing	1
Rhode Island Party	1

== Timeline ==
Timeline of Rhode Island governors

== See also ==
- Lieutenant Governor of Rhode Island
