= Government of Rhode Island =

- Seal of The State of Rhode Island
- Polity type: Presidential Republic
- Constitution: Constitution of Rhode Island

Legislative branch
- Name: General Assembly
- Type: Bicameral
- Meeting place: Rhode Island State House
- Upper house
- Name: Senate
- Presiding officer: Dominick J. Ruggerio, President
- Lower house
- Name: House of Representatives
- Presiding officer: Joe Shekarchi, Speaker

Executive branch
- Head of state and government
- Title: Governor
- Currently: Daniel McKee
- Appointer: Election
- Cabinet
- Leader: Governor
- Deputy leader: Lieutenant Governor
- Headquarters: State House

Judicial branch
- Name: Judiciary of Rhode Island
- Courts: Courts of Rhode Island
- Rhode Island Supreme Court
- Chief judge: Paul Suttell
- Seat: Providence County Courthouse, Providence

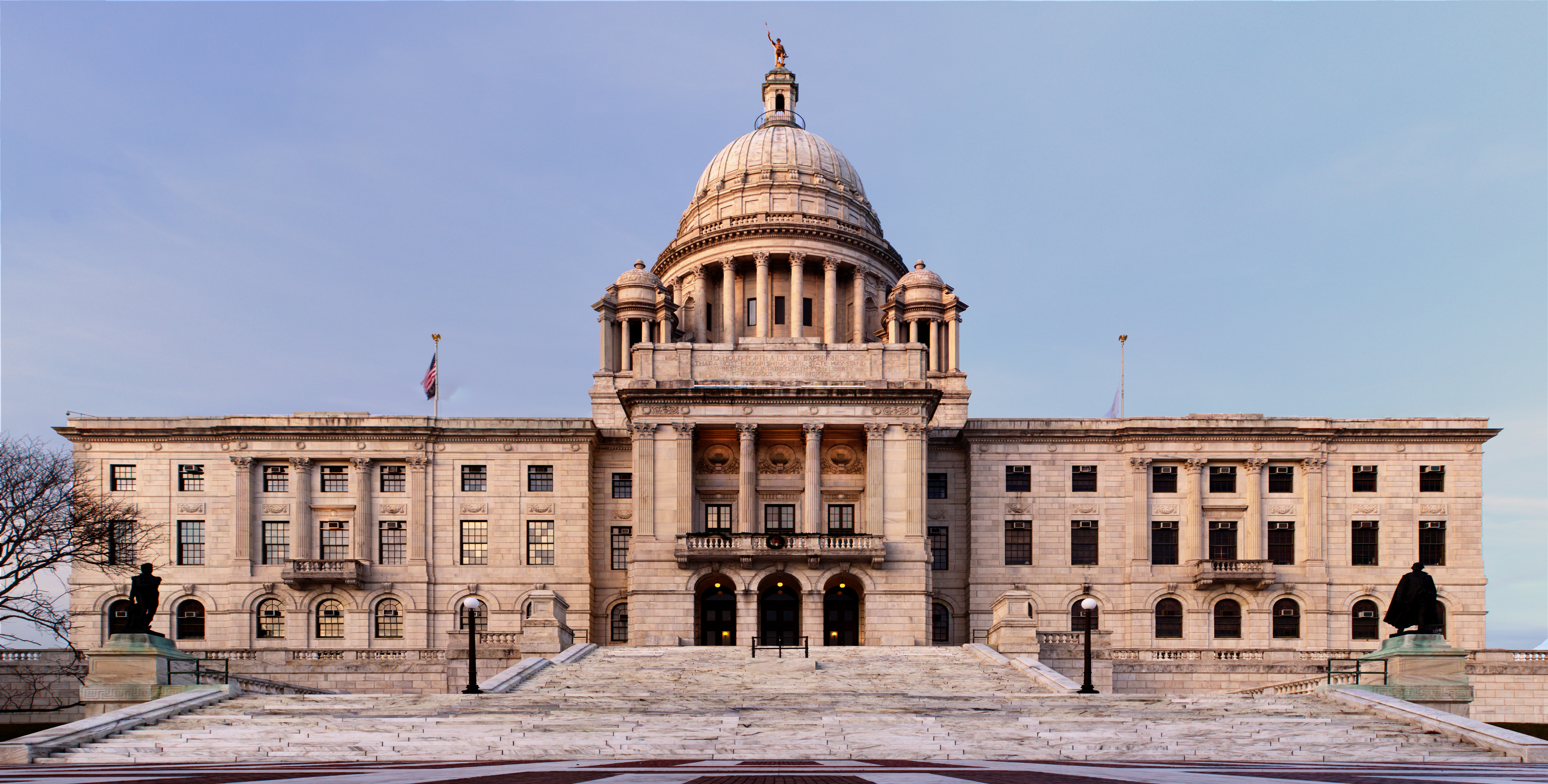
The State House in Providence is the seat of Rhode Island's state government

The government of the state of Rhode Island is prescribed from a multitude of sources; the main sources are the Rhode Island Constitution, the General Laws, and executive orders. The governmental structure is modeled on the government of the United States in having three branches: executive, legislative, and judicial.

== Legislature ==
Pursuant to Articles VI, VII, and VIII of the Rhode Island Constitution, the legislature is vested in the Rhode Island General Assembly. The General Assembly is bicameral, composed of the House of Representatives and the Senate.

The House of Representatives has a total of 75 members currently. The Senate has 38 members. The General Assembly meets in the State House.

== Executive branch ==
Elected executive officials of Rhode Island

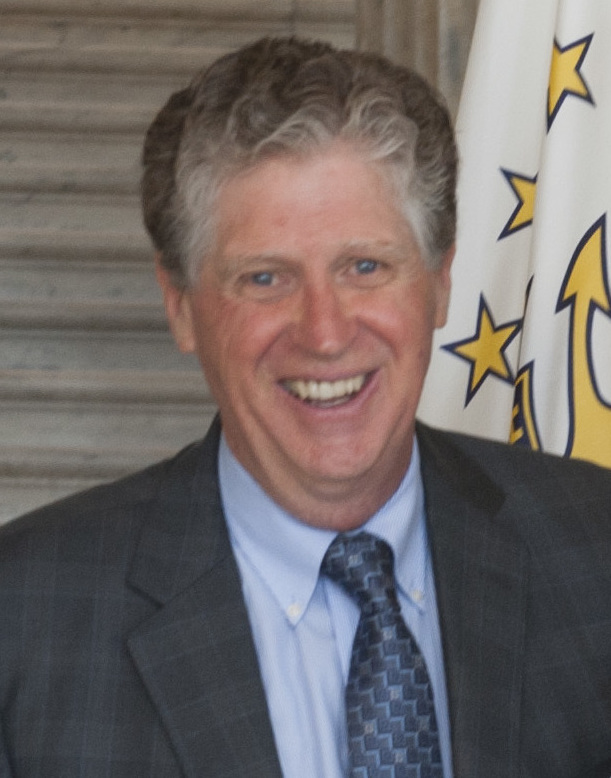
Governor
Daniel McKee (D)

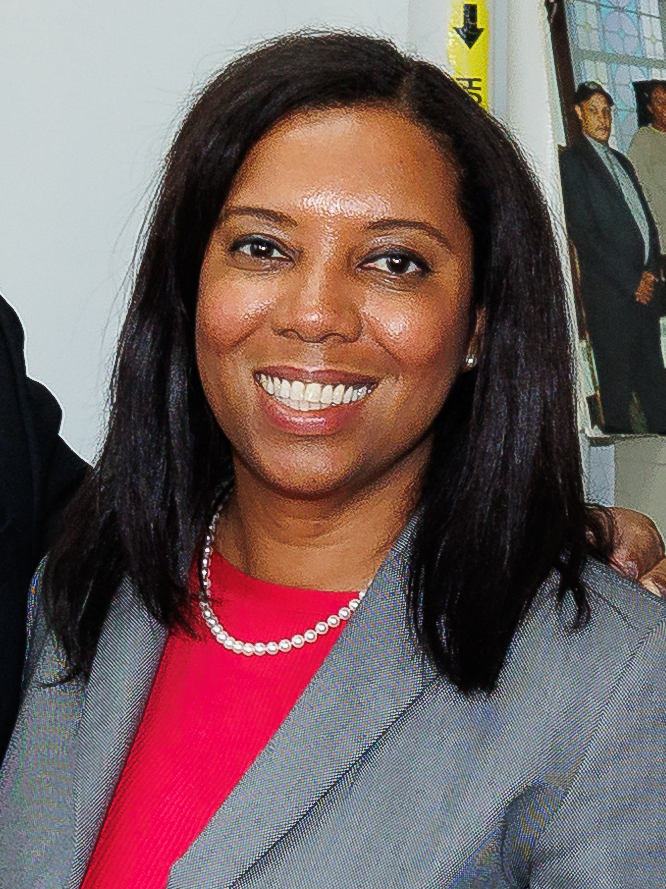
Lieutenant Governor
Sabina Matos (D)

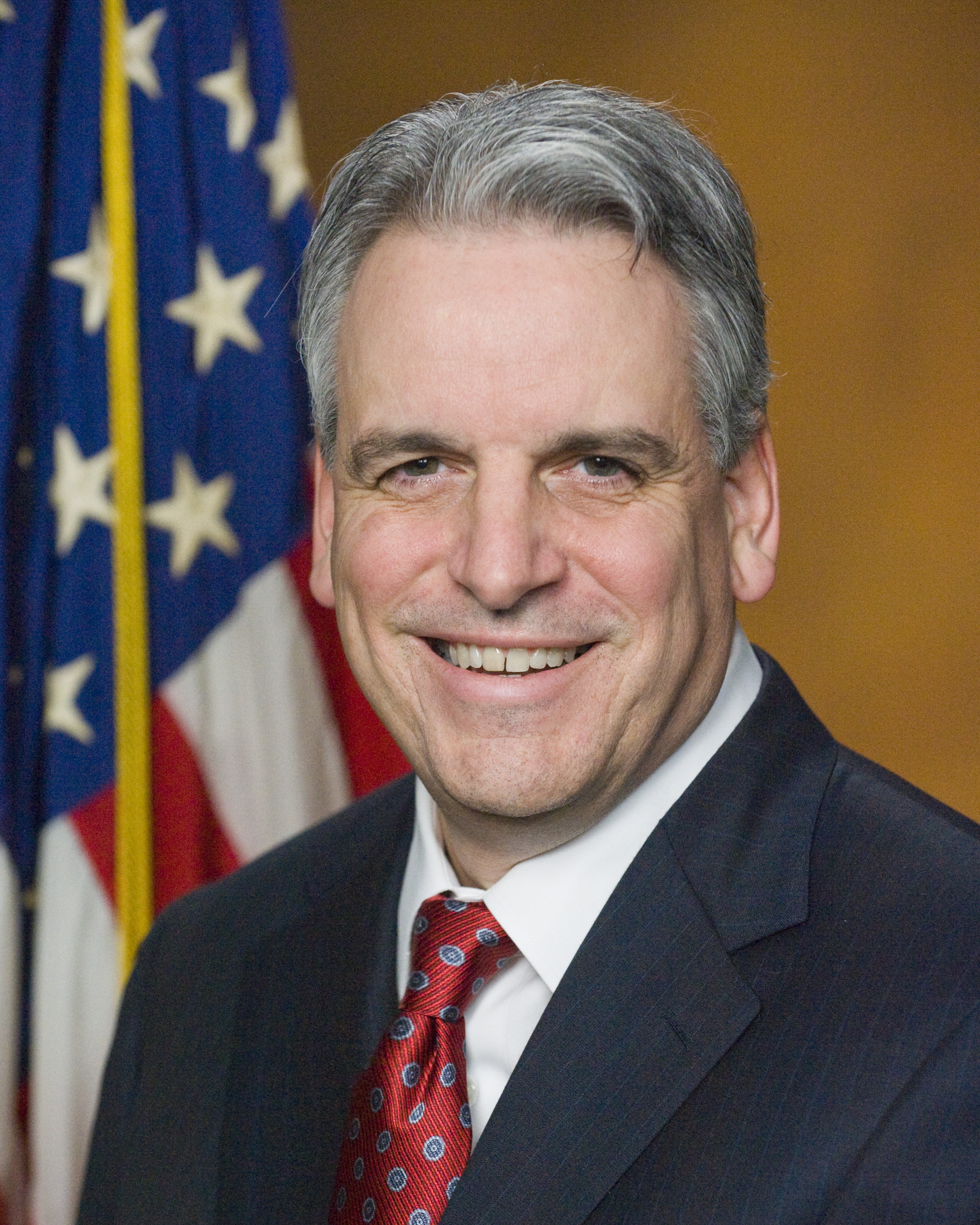
Attorney General
Peter Neronha (D)

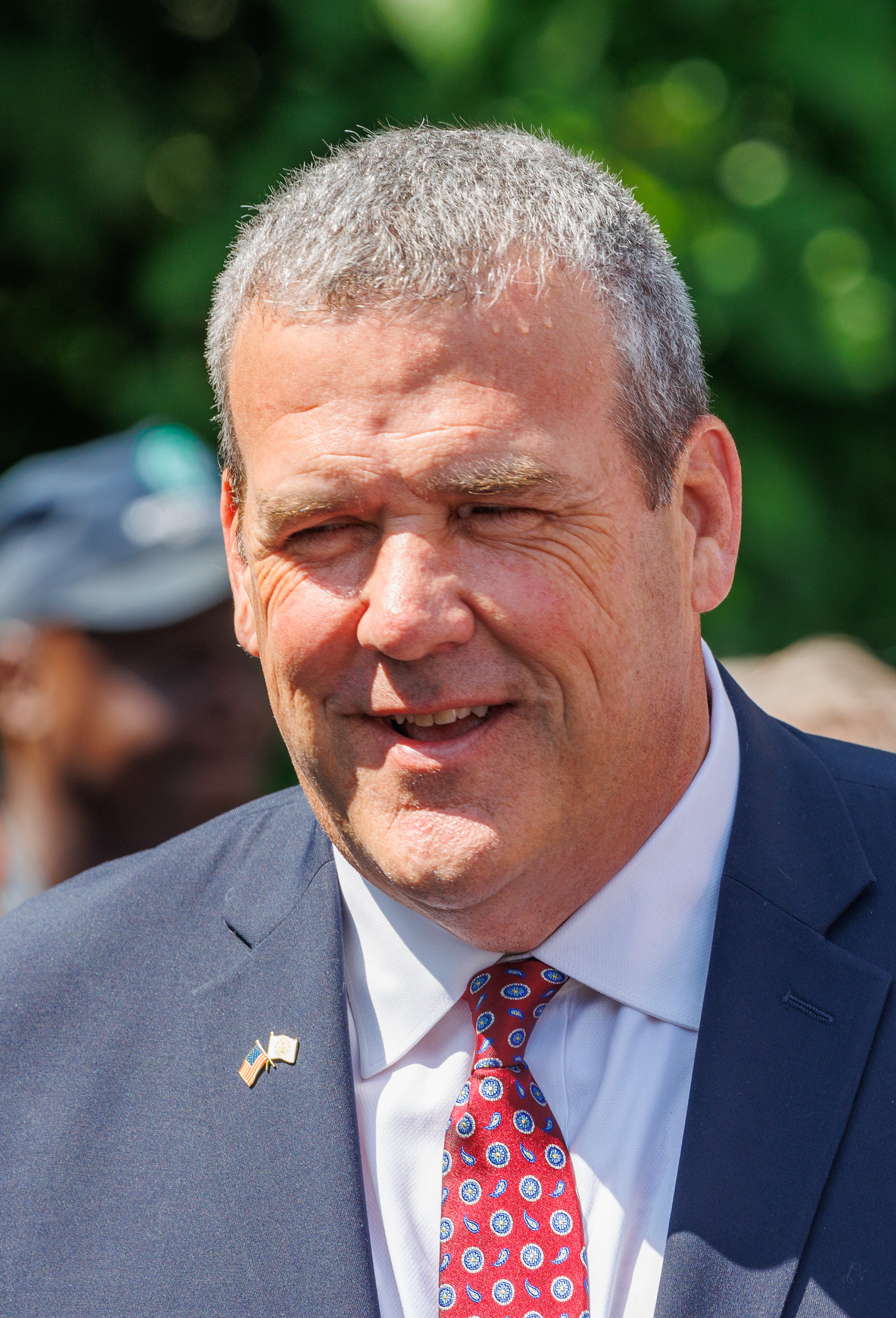
Secretary of State
Gregg Amore (D)

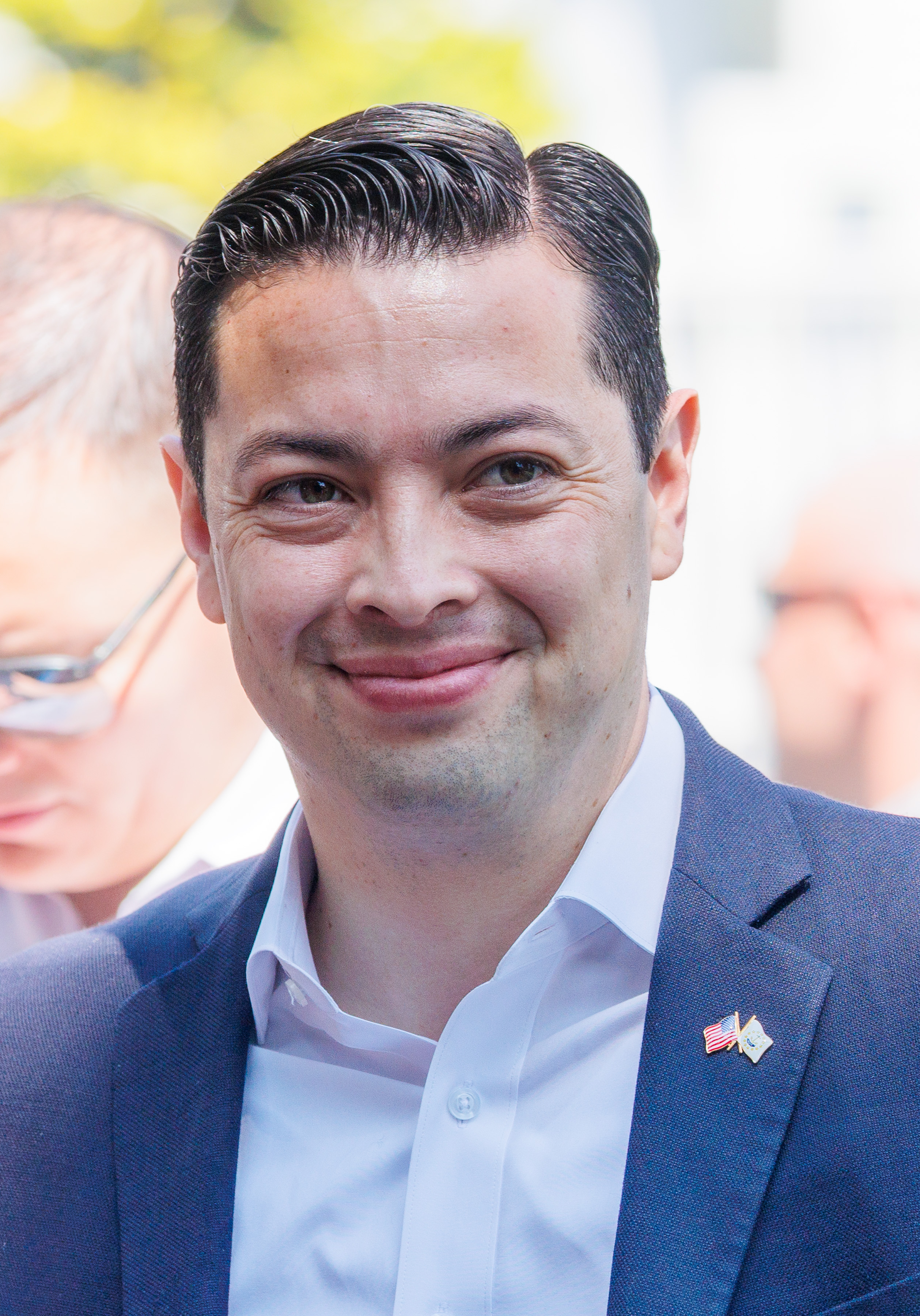
General Treasurer
James Diossa (D)

The state elects a governor, a lieutenant governor, a secretary of state, a general treasurer, and an attorney general. The governor appoints a Sheriff, who, unlike most other sheriffs, has statewide jurisdiction. The governor appoints many officers to act as commissioners, directors, or other officers.

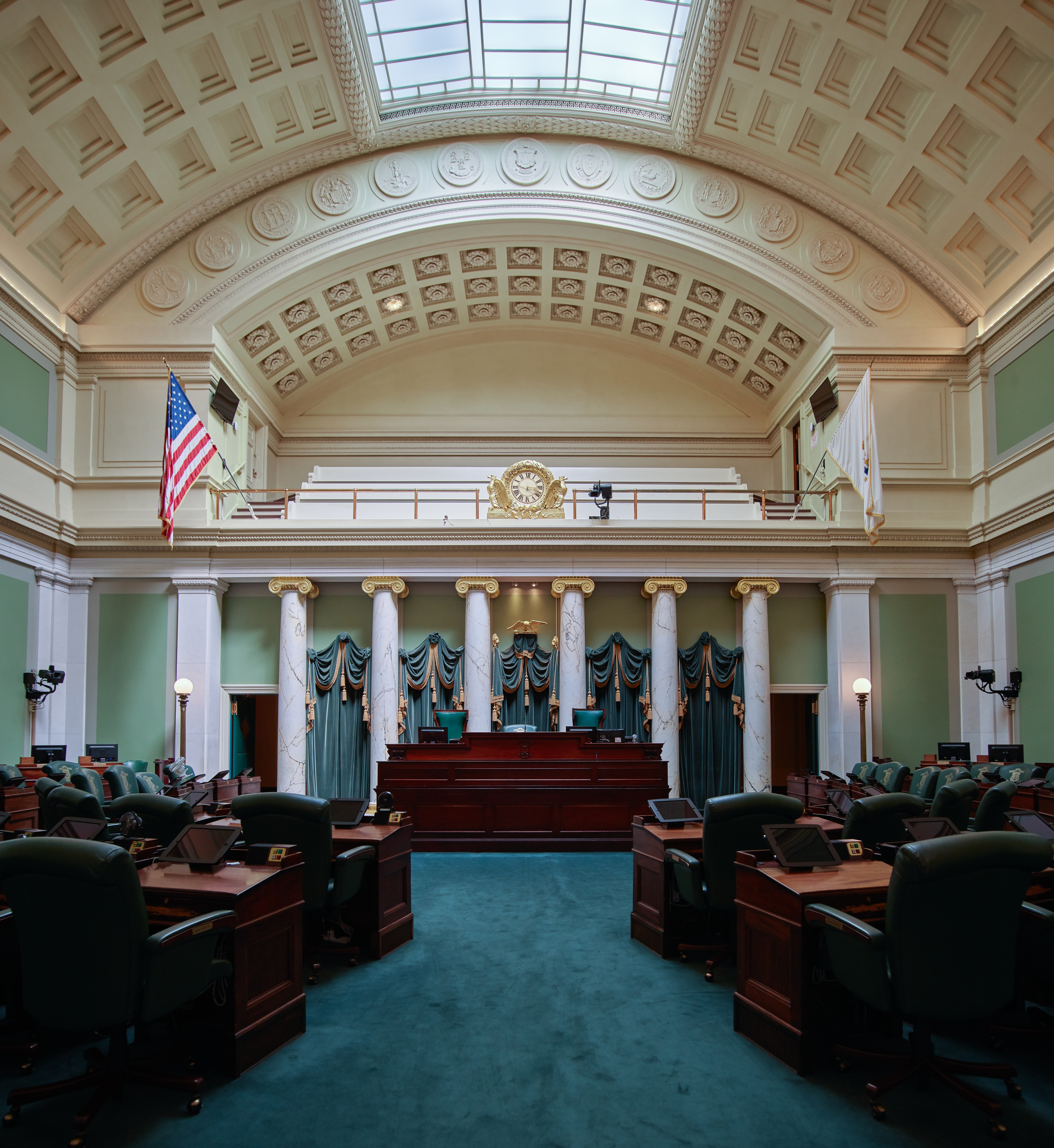
The Senate Chamber

The executive authority is vested in the governor, typically through various directors and commissioners. The lieutenant governor, though nominally in the executive branch, is a largely ceremonial position. The governor and lieutenant governor are elected on separate tickets by the electorate of Rhode Island. The governor's offices are located in the State House. Rhode Island is one of the few states that lacks a governor's mansion.

=== Departments and agencies ===
Rhode Island government has numerous departments, agencies, and divisions. The major ones are:

- Department of Administration
- Department of Business Regulation
- Department of Corrections
- Department of Education
- Department of Environmental Management
- Department of Labor and Training
- Department of Public Safety
  - State Police
  - Capitol Police
  - Division of Sheriffs
- Department of Revenue
  - Division of Motor Vehicles
  - Division of Taxation
- Department of Transportation
- Executive Office of Commerce
- Executive Office of Health and Human Services
  - Department of Behavioral Healthcare, Developmental Disabilities & Hospitals
  - Department of Children, Youths, and Families
  - Department of Health
  - Department of Human Services
- Rhode Island Emergency Management Agency
- Rhode Island National Guard
  - Army National Guard
  - Air National Guard

== Judicial branch ==
The judicial branch of the state government consists of the Rhode Island Supreme Court and the lower courts, which consist of the Superior Court, Family Court, District Court, Workers' Compensation Court and the Rhode Island Traffic Tribunal.

== See also ==
- Impeachment in Rhode Island
