= Jeffrey Newton =

American politician

8th Commissioner of the Alabama Department of Veterans Affairs
- Incumbent
- Assumed office March 19, 2025
- Appointed by: Kay Ivey
- Governor: Kay Ivey
- Preceded by: Kent Davis

Personal details
- Education: Samford University; Auburn University

Jeffrey L. Newton is an American politician who has served as the commissioner of the Alabama Department of Veterans Affairs (ADVA) since 2025. He was previously involved with the Alabama National Guard and served with the United States Air Force during his military career.

== Education ==
Newton attended Samford University and Auburn University.

== Career ==
Newton served in the air force for and the Alabama Air National Guard for 41 years. He was appointed as the interim commissioner of the ADVA on October 23, 2024, after Kent Davis was removed from his position by Kay Ivey. After the Alabama Legislature passed a bill that reorganized the ADVA and provided for the governor to appoint future commissioners, Newton was appointed by Ivey to the position. He took office on March 19, 2025, becoming the first commissioner to serve in the state cabinet.
