= Rhode Island Department of Revenue =

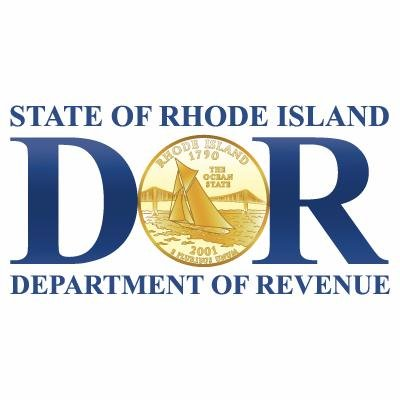
- Official Logo

Agency overview
- Formed: July 1, 2006
- Headquarters: Providence, Rhode Island
- Annual budget: 706,383,257
- Agency executive: Guillermo Tello, Director of Revenue
- Child agencies: Division of Motor Vehicles; Division of Taxation
- Website: dor.ri.gov

The Rhode Island Department of Revenue (RIDOR) is a state agency of Rhode Island responsible for collection of taxes and distribution of state revenue, as well as administration of state laws governing driver licensing, and motor vehicle sale and registration. The current Director of the Department of Revenue is Guillermo Tello, appointed by Governor Dan McKee on May 4, 2021.

== Organization ==
- Director of Revenue
  - Office of the Director of Revenue
    - Deputy Director of Revenue
    - Legal Counsel
    - Office of Information and Public Relations
  - Central Collections Unit (CCU), collects debts owed to the state.
  - Division of Motor Vehicles (DMV), issues, suspends, and revokes drives licenses and license plates and regulates automobile safety.
    - Adjudication Office
  - Division of Municipal Finance (DMF), monitors the financial conditions of cities and towns and provides information to the General Assembly and other policymakers regarding areas of public disclosure, tax levies, and financial reporting.
  - Division of Taxation, administers and collects all state taxes and assists taxpayers in understanding and meeting tax requirements.
  - Office of Revenue Analysis (ORA), produces monthly reports and assessments on the state's revenue and cash collection to the Office of Management and Budget.
  - Rhode Island Lottery

== See also ==
- Rhode Island General Treasurer
- Rhode Island Department of Administration
- Rhode Island Department of Transportation
- Rhode Island Government
