= Kent Davis =

American politician

7th Commissioner of the Alabama Department of Veterans Affairs
- In office February 19, 2019 – October 22, 2024
- Governor: Kay Ivey
- Preceded by: Clyde Marsh
- Succeeded by: Jeffrey Newton

Personal details
- Born: Montgomery, Alabama, U.S.
- Party: Republican
- Education: Louisiana State University (BS); Georgia State University (JD)

Kent Davis is an American politician who served as the Alabama Department of Veterans Affairs Commissioner from 2019 to 2024. He is a member of the Alabama Republican Party.

== Military career ==
Davis served in the military for nearly 31 years, retiring in 2016.

== Political career ==
Davis was first appointed to the Department of Veterans Affairs in January 2019, and took office on February 19.

In September 2024, it was announced that Davis would resign at the end of the year, following a meeting with Kay Ivey, the Governor of Alabama. On October 22, 2024, the State Board of Veterans Affairs voted to retain him as the head of the department for the remainder of the year. Less than an hour after the meeting, Ivey overrode the decision and fired Davis immediately. Ivey claimed authority to override the board's decision due to her position as chief executive. He filed a lawsuit against Ivey in June 2025.

He considered running in the 2026 Alabama gubernatorial election.
