= Stacia Robinson =

American politician and businesswoman

Director of the Alabama Office of Civic Engagement
- Incumbent
- Assumed office January 1, 2023
- Appointed by: Kay Ivey
- Governor: Kay Ivey
- Preceded by: Nichelle Nix

Personal details
- Education: Spelman College; Troy University

Stacia Robinson is an American politician and businesswoman who has served as the director of the Alabama Office of Civic Engagement since 2022. She has been involved with business for much of her life.

== Education ==
Robinson attended Spelman College, where she received as Bachelor of Science degree in mathematics. She then attended Troy University, receiving a Master of Science in Human Resource Development.

== Career ==
Robinson owned the Business Network International franchise for 25 years, selling it before she took a role in the government of Alabama. She worked on the Industrial Development Board of Montgomery In December 2022, governor Kay Ivey appointed Robinson as the director of the Alabama Office of Minority Affairs, her term beginning on January 1, 2023.

In her role, Robinson advises the governor on policy issues impacting women and minorities. Robinson was part of the 21 members of the state cabinet who received raises in July 2024, with hers being a 26% salary increase to $177,888. The department was renamed to the Alabama Office of Civic Engagement in the 2026 legislative session.
