= Alabama Department of Veterans Affairs =

Agency overview
- Formed: October 1, 1945
- Agency executive: Jeffrey Newton, Commissioner
- Website: va.alabama.gov

The Alabama Department of Veterans Affairs is a department of the Government of Alabama that manages benefits for veterans in the state.

== History ==
The department was established on October 1, 1945, by the Alabama Legislature.

In October 2024, then-commissioner Kent Davis was removed from his position by Kay Ivey, the Governor of Alabama. This later lead to a restructuring, which resulted in the restructuring of the Alabama State Board of Veterans Affairs, consisting of seventeen members, including the Governor and department commissioner.
