= Alabama Office of Civic Engagement =

Government agency in Alabama, US

Agency overview
- Agency executive: Stacia Robinson, Director
- Website: aoma.alabama.gov

The Alabama Office of Civic Engagement, previously known as the Alabama Office of Minority Affairs is a department of the government of Alabama. Stacia Robinson currently serves as director of the organization.
