= Bo Offord =

American politician

Commissioner of the Alabama Medicaid Agency
- Incumbent
- Assumed office July 16, 2025
- Appointed by: Kay Ivey
- Preceded by: Stephanie Azar

Personal details
- Education: University of Alabama; Thomas Goode Jones School of Law

Timothy Alan Offord Jr. is an American politician who has served as the commissioner of the Alabama Medicaid Agency (AMA) since 2025. He joined the agency in 2010, working in the legal department.

== Education ==
Offord graduated from the University of Alabama and received his law degree from the Thomas Goode Jones School of Law.

== Career ==
Offord began his legal career in 2007 and joined the AMA in 2010. He worked as the general counsel for the agency up until 2025. On July 10, 2026, Offord was appointed by Kay Ivey to serve as commissioner of the AMA. He was sworn in on July 16.

As commissioner, Offord manages budget requests and medicaid in the state. He requested a budget of $1.179 billion in 2026, a 3% increase from the previous year.
