= Alabama Medicaid Agency =

Government agency in Alabama, US

Agency overview
- Agency executive: Bo Offord, Commissioner
- Website: medicaid.alabama.gov

The Alabama Medicaid Agency is a department of the government of Alabama that manages medicaid in the state. Bo Offord currently serves as commissioner of the organization.
