= Vernon Barnett =

American politician

CEO of the Alabama Department of Revenue
- Incumbent
- Assumed office May 22, 2017
- Appointed by: Kay Ivey
- Governor: Kay Ivey
- Preceded by: Julie Magee

Personal details
- Education: Vanderbilt University; University of Alabama School of Law

Vernon Barnett is an American politician who is the CEO of the Alabama Department of Revenue since 2017. He previously worked in various other state government agencies.

== Education ==
Barnett attended Vanderbilt University and the University of Alabama School of Law.

== Career ==
Barnett worked for multiple state government agencies, including the Alabama Department of Corrections in from 2006 to 2011. He was appointed as the CEO of the Alabama Department of Revenue, where he took office on May 22, 2017. Barnett led the department through the COVID-19 pandemic as the department collected a record amount of revenue in 2020.

Barnett was sued by the city government and school system of Tuscaloosa in August 2025, in which they argued that the Simplified Sellers Use Tax was unconstitutional. The lawsuit was voluntarily dismissed by the city during the 2026 legislative session. On April 22, Barnett announced his retirement from state government at the end of the month.

== Personal life ==
Barnett is married to Robyn Moudy and has two children.
