= Rhode Island Department of Administration =

Agency of the Government of Rhode Island

Rhode Island Department of Administration (RIDOA)

Agency overview
- Jurisdiction: Rhode Island
- Headquarters: 1 Capitol Hill Providence, Rhode Island
- Agency executives: Jonathan Womer, Director; Brenna McCabe, Deputy Director; Rebecca Webber, Deputy Director for Performance & Projects
- Website: http://www.admin.ri.gov

The Rhode Island Department of Administration (RIDOA), is a department level agency of the Government of Rhode Island.

== Functions and responsibilities ==
The RIDOA's responsibilities include the development and administration of the State budget; determining and maintaining standard specifications for purchases, contracts, bids and awards for State purchases; maintenance and upkeep and procurement of State facilities; administration of the statewide planning program and overall personnel administration and management of State departments and agencies and the negotiation of State employee union contracts.

The department, headed by the Director of Administration, has seventeen programmatic functions. The functions include Legal Services, Accounts and Control, Purchasing, Auditing, Human Resources, Budgeting, Facilities Management, Personnel Appeal Board, Information Technology, Capital Projects and Property Management, General Appropriations, Energy Resources, Library and Information Services, Planning, Debt Service Payments and Internal Services Programs.

== Divisions run by the Department ==
The Rhode Island Department of Administration is separated into nine divisions and offices:

- Office of Management and Budget
- Division of Human Resources
- Division of Information Technology
- Division of Purchases
- Division of Legal Services
- Office of Accounts and Control
- Office of Capital Asset Management and Maintenance
- Division of Planning
- Division of Equity, Diversity and Inclusion

== See also ==
- Government of Rhode Island
- Rhode Island Department of Transportation
- Rhode Island Department of Corrections
- Rhode Island Department of Children, Youth & Families
