= Constitution of Rhode Island =

American state constitution

The Constitution of the State of Rhode Island is a document describing the structure and function of the government of the U.S. state of Rhode Island.

== 1842 Constitution ==
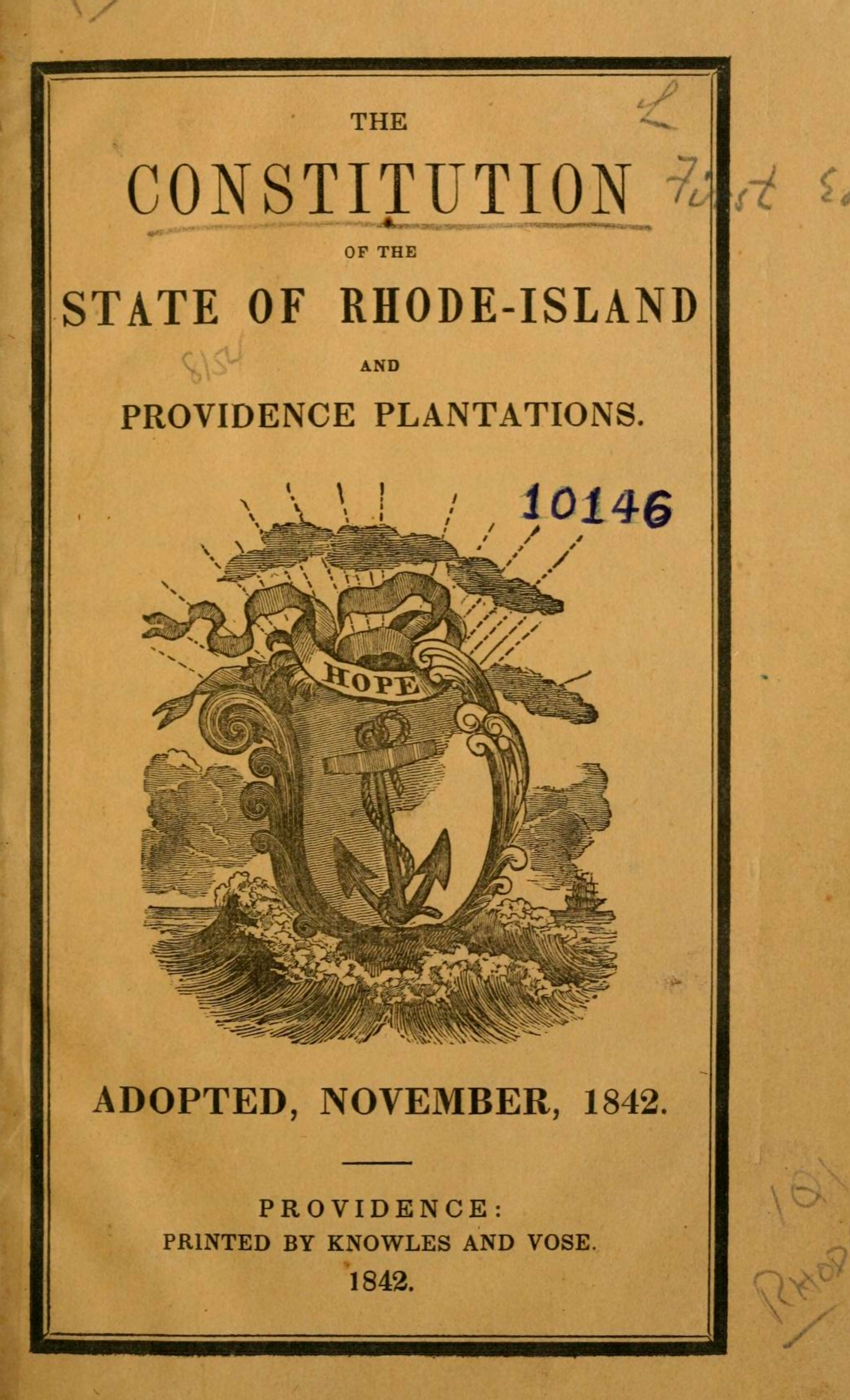
The 1842 Constitution

=== Constitutional Convention ===
After unsuccessfully petitioning the Rhode Island Legislature to expand suffrage beyond land owners, a group of Rhode Island residents held a voluntary constitutional convention in 1841. Prior to 1842, Rhode Island was still governed by the 1663 Royal Charter. At nearly two centuries old, the document essentially restricted voting rights to a very small population of elite, rural, landowning native-born white males. Two disenfranchised groups in particular, immigrants and free African-American laborers, had been petitioning the General Assembly for the right to vote for decades.

These issues came to a head with the Dorr Rebellion in spring 1842 which attempted to enforce the new Rhode Island Constitution through force. The proceeding clash between rival governments led to the landmark case of Luther v. Borden, which defined the unwillingness of the U.S. Supreme Court to determine the legitimacy of elected State governments, a cornerstone of the political question doctrine. Although the rebellion was led by middle-class urban white males, it forced conservative leaders in Rhode Island to consider the larger question of expansion of suffrage.

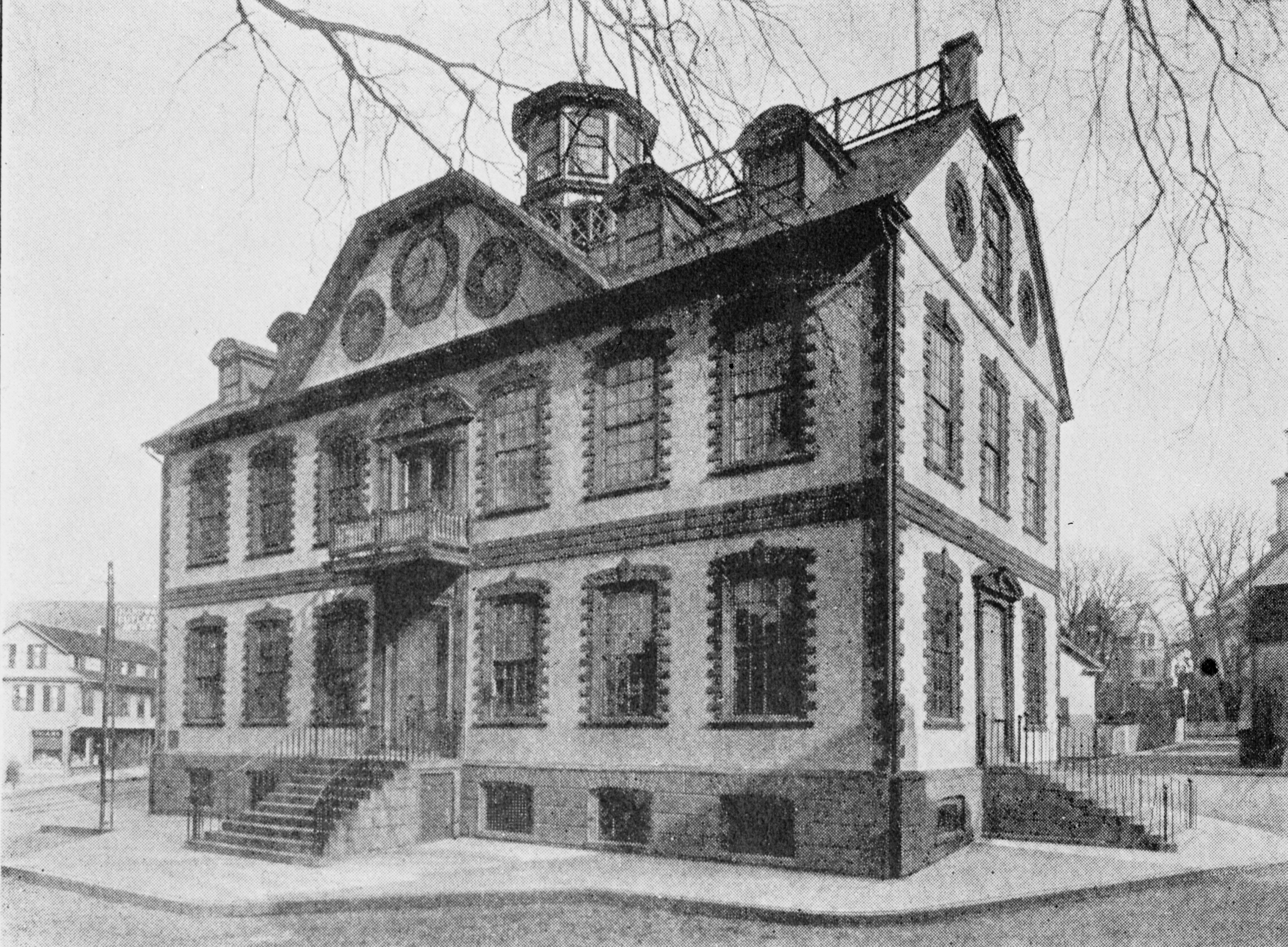
The 1842 Constitutional Convention met in Newport's Colony House.

In September 1842, a Constitutional Convention was held at the Colony House in Newport to confront the issue of expanding suffrage. Black civil rights activists including Ichabod Northup and James Jefferson pushed for the right to vote. They were joined by whites including Crawford Allan, future governor James Y. Smith, reformer Thomas Robinson Hazard, and The Providence Journal editor Henry Bowen Anthony.

When the constitution was put to a public vote in November 1842, a ballot question asked whether voting rights should be restricted to whites only. Voters rejected the restriction by a three to one margin, thus making Rhode Island the first state to grant suffrage to African-Americans. The new constitution was ratified by an overwhelming vote of 7,024 to 51. The turnout was meager, as the opposition boycotted the election.

The constitution became effective in May 1843. Much of the text of the 1663 charter language remained in the new version.

=== Features of the 1842 Constitution ===
Article II, Section 1 of the 1842 constitution continued the requirement of the royal charter which held that only landowners with $134 in property could vote. (This provision would be overturned by a subsequent amendment.) The new constitution extended universal suffrage to all native adult males, including black males, for the first time in Rhode Island history, provided they met property holding and residency requirements.

The constitution specifically prohibited members of the Narragansett Indian Tribe from voting. (Article II, Section 4.) It was because the constitution continued the property requirement for voting that was established by the royal charter.

Naturalized citizens, mainly Irish Catholics, remained largely disenfranchised by the property requirements which remained in the new Constitution.

Another progressive feature of the new constitution was that it outlawed slavery in Rhode Island. (Article 1, Section 4.) This provision, however, was largely symbolic as the 1840 census listed only five enslaved persons in Rhode Island.

Rhode Island held constitutional conventions in 1944, 1951, 1955, 1958, 1964–69, and 1973.

== 1984 Constitutional Convention ==
In 1984, Rhode Island voters approved a referendum proposal to call a new Constitutional Convention, which was elected in November 1985 and convened in January 1986. The new constitution was ratified by the voters in the general election of November 1986. On January 20, 1987, "the state's first new constitution in 144 years was officially entered into the state Archives".

=== Features of the 1984 Constitution ===
The 1984 constitution begins by declaring that the people of the state are "grateful to Almighty God" and are "looking to Him for a blessing upon our endeavors to secure and to transmit the same, unimpaired, to succeeding generations".
