= Alabama Department of Revenue =

Government agency in Alabama, US

Agency overview
- Agency executive: Vernon Barnett, CEO
- Website: revenue.alabama.gov

The Alabama Medicaid Agency is a department of the government of Alabama that enforces revenue laws in the state. Vernon Barnett is CEO of the organization.
