= Rhode Island Route 126 =

State highway in Providence County, Rhode Island, US

Route 126
- Route 126 highlighted in red

Route information
- Maintained by RIDOT
- Length: 14.3 mi (23.0 km)
- Existed: May 1962–present

Major junctions
- South end: US 1 in Providence
- I-95 in Providence Route 116 in Lincoln Route 114 in Woonsocket
- North end: Route 126 in Blackstone, MA

Location
- Country: United States
- State: Rhode Island
- Counties: Providence

Highway system
- Rhode Island Routes
← Route 123	→ Route 128

Route 126 is a 14.3-mile-long (23.0 km) state highway in the U.S. state of Rhode Island. Route 126 is a heavily traveled route in Pawtucket. Its southern terminus is at U.S. Route 1 (US 1) in Providence, and its northern terminus is at the Massachusetts border where it continues as Massachusetts Route 126.

== Route description ==
Route 126 begins at an intersection with Providence's North Main Street, which is signed US 1. The northbound direction begins on Smithfield Avenue, and very soon after interchanging with Interstate 95 it comes to an intersection with Silver Spring Street and Foch Avenue, where Route 126 turns right, continuing on Smithfield Avenue. The route forms a skewed intersection with Power Road, afterwards narrowing to two lanes, and continues through a dense residential area as it skirts the west side of Pawtucket.

West of Lincoln Woods State Park and within the Lincoln town limits, Route 126 turns onto River Road, just south of Route 123, which it intersects shortly after. It continues north, now known as River Road as it parallels the Blackstone River, which lies to the east. South of Albion, the route's name changes to Old River Road at an intersection with Lower River Road, and it intersects Route 116 and flies over Interstate 295 with no access. The route then enters Manville, where it curves westward before turning right at an intersection with Sayles Hill Road, continuing north.

Passing underneath Route 99 with no access, Route 126 meets New River Road's northern terminus, upon which the route's name changes again to Manville Road, cutting briefly across the North Smithfield town line. As it enters Woonsocket, the road begins to parallel Blackstone River more closely, the two straddling a railroad alignment. Within the city, the route turns eastward onto Hamlet Avenue, forming a concurrency with its Route 122. The two routes then bridge the river and intersect Cumberland Street. Here, Route 126 turns northward onto four lanes of Cumberland Street while Route 122 turns southward. Eventually, Cumberland Street intersects Clinton Street and Social Street, where Route 126 turns eastward, using both streets for northbound and southbound, respectively.

Route 126's one-way pair merge into Social Street at an intersection with Elm Street shortly afterward. The route then intersects Privilege Street, carrying Route 114. Route 126 forms an overlap with Route 114, which it then releases at Diamond Hill Road. Route 126 continues its final trek north to the Massachusetts state line, where the route continues as Massachusetts Route 126 and still carrying the name Social Street for a short distance into that state.

== History ==
Prior to May 1962, Route 126 was in the Tiverton and Little Compton area. It started at the intersection of present-day Route 179 and Route 81. It went north along Route 179 to present-day Route 77. It then went north on Route 77 to end at Route 138 near the eastern end of the now demolished Stone Bridge.

== Major intersections ==
The entire route is in Providence County.

Location	mi	km	Destinations	Notes
Providence	0.0	0.0	US 1 (North Main Street) to Route 246 / US 44	Southern terminus
Providence	0.3	0.48	I-95 to I-195 / US 6 / Route 10 – Pawtucket, Downtown Providence	Exit 39 on I-95; partial cloverleaf interchange
Pawtucket	1.6	2.6	Route 15 (Mineral Spring Avenue) to Route 146	
Lincoln	3.8	6.1	Route 123 (Front Street)	Southbound junction, end of SB concurrency with RI-123. Northbound uses River Rd.
Lincoln	4.0	6.4	Route 123 (Front Street)	Beginning of southbound conucrrency with RI-123, Northbound junction.
Lincoln	7.1	11.4	Route 116 (George Washington Highway) to Route 146 / Route 246 / I-295	
Manville	9.6	15.4	Main Street to Route 120	
Manville	10.0	16.1	Sayles Hill Road to Route 99	
Woonsocket	12.8	20.6	Route 122 south (Hamlet Avenue)	Southern terminus of concurrency with Route 122
Woonsocket	13.0	20.9	Bridge over the Blackstone River	
Woonsocket	13.0	20.9	Route 122 north (Cumberland Hill Road)	Northern terminus of concurrency with Route 122
Woonsocket	13.9	22.4	Route 114 north (Privilege Street)	Southern terminus of concurrency with Route 114
Woonsocket	14.0	22.5	Route 114 south (Diamond Hill Road)	Northern terminus of concurrency with Route 114
Woonsocket	14.3	23.0	Route 126 north – Bellingham	Continuation into Massachusetts
1.000 mi = 1.609 km; 1.000 km = 0.621 mi: Concurrency terminus
