= Rhode Island Route 123 =

State highway in Providence County, Rhode Island, US

Route 123
- Route 123 highlighted in red

Route information
- Maintained by RIDOT
- Length: 7.8 mi (12.6 km)

Major junctions
- West end: Route 116 in Lincoln
- Route 146 in Lincoln; Route 114 in Cumberland
- East end: Route 123 in Attleboro, MA

Location
- Country: United States
- State: Rhode Island
- Counties: Providence

Highway system
- Rhode Island Routes
← Route 122	→ Route 126

Route 123 is a state highway running 7.8 miles (12.6 km) in the U.S. state of Rhode Island. Its western terminus is at Route 116 in Lincoln, and its eastern terminus is at the Massachusetts border where it continues as Massachusetts Route 123.

== Route description ==
Route 123 begins at an intersection with Route 116, the George Washington Highway, northeast of North Central State Airport in Lincoln. Signed as heading eastbound, the route initially travels in a southwesterly direction, carrying the name Albion Road. Route 123 skirts the east side of the airport on a two-lane road, briefly crossing into Smithfield. Here, Route 123 meets an intersection with Jenckes Hill Road, which the route begins to follow eastward from the airport and back into Lincoln. The road passes through a heavily wooded suburban area, intersecting Route 246 and interchanging with Route 146 at Exit 5 directly after.

Route 123 then takes on the name of Breakneck Hill Road and winds around its namesake hill on a curvy alignment. After an intersection with East Butterfly Way, its name changes again to Great Road. This stretch of Route 123 is designated as the Great Road Historic District; while mostly residential, the road passes by an entrance to Lincoln Woods State Park before changing to Front Street and continuing into the Lonsdale section of Lincoln where it intersects with Route 126. At the far east side of town, the route intersects Route 122 on Lonsdale Avenue, and its name changes to John Street before it bridges the Blackstone River alongside the Blackstone River Greenway and crosses into the town of Cumberland.

Just across the Blackstone River, Route 123 splits into a one-way pair of Chambers Street westbound and John Street eastbound, entering the village of Valley Falls and intersecting Broad Street, onto which the route turns north. The road bridges a railroad alignment within town before intersecting Dexter Street, where the road turns eastward once more and then intersects Route 114's High Street the next block over. Route 123 and Dexter Street continue east over a creek and exit the state, becoming Massachusetts Route 123, which continues eastward through eastern Massachusetts.

== Major intersections ==
The entire route is in Providence County.

Location	mi	km	Destinations	Notes
Lincoln	0.0	0.0	Route 116 (George Washington Highway) to Route 7 / I-295	Western terminus
Smithfield	1.1	1.8	North Central State Airport	
Lincoln	3.4	5.5	Route 246 (Old Louisquisset Pike) – Lincoln Greyhound Park	
Lincoln	3.6	5.8	Route 146 – Providence, Worcester, MA	Exit 5 on Route 146; partial cloverleaf interchange
Lincoln	5.5	8.9	Route 126 (River Road)	
Lincoln	6.1	9.8	Route 122 (Lonsdale Avenue)	
Blackstone River	6.3	10.1	Bridge	
Cumberland	7.2	11.6	Route 114 (High Street)	
Cumberland	7.8	12.6	Route 123 east – Attleboro	Continuation into Massachusetts
1.000 mi = 1.609 km; 1.000 km = 0.621 mi
