= Route 15 (Rhode Island–Massachusetts) =

Highway in Rhode Island and Massachusetts

Route 15
- Route 15 highlighted in red

Route information
- Maintained by RIDOT and MassDOT
- Length: 8.3 mi (13.4 km)

Major junctions
- West end: US 44 in North Providence, RI
- Route 146 in North Providence, RI; Route 114 in Pawtucket, RI; I-95 / US 1 in Pawtucket, RI
- East end: Route 152 in Seekonk, MA

Location
- Country: United States
- State: Rhode Island
- Counties: Providence (RI), Bristol (MA)

Highway system
- Rhode Island Routes
← Route 14	→ Route 24
← Route 14	MA	→ Route 16

Route 15 is a state highway in the U.S. states of Rhode Island and Massachusetts. The highway runs 8.3 miles (13.4 km) from U.S. Route 44 (US 44) in North Providence, Rhode Island east through Pawtucket to the Massachusetts state line, where the highway continues for 0.23 miles (0.37 km) to Route 152 in Seekonk.

== Route description ==
=== North Providence, Rhode Island ===
Route 15 begins in the commercial center of Centerdale on the western edge of the town of North Providence. The state highway begins as a one-lane eastbound street at eastbound US 44 (Smith Avenue). Route 15 becomes two-way at its intersection with westbound US 44 (Centerdale Bypass), which leads to Route 104 (Waterman Avenue). The highway heads east as Mineral Spring Avenue, a two-lane road with frequent center turn lanes, through a densely populated suburban area. Route 15 intersects Smithfield Road and Route 7 (Douglas Avenue) while crossing the town from west to east. On the east side of North Providence, the highway has a three-quarter diamond interchange with Route 146 (Louisquisset Pike); there is no ramp from Route 15 to northbound Route 146. The missing movement is provided via Route 246 (Charles Street), which the highway meets east of the interchange and where the center turn lane ceases.

=== Pawtucket, Rhode Island ===
Route 15 leaves North Providence and enters the city of Pawtucket between Route 246 and Route 126 (Smithfield Avenue). The highway crosses the Moshassuck River, has a grade crossing of a Providence and Worcester Railroad rail spur, and intersects Route 122 (Lonsdale Avenue) just before crossing over Amtrak's Northeast Corridor.

At the western edge of downtown Pawtucket, Mineral Spring Avenue ends at its oblique intersection with Main Street between Mineral Spring Cemetery and Mineral Spring Park, which contains the Collyer Monument. Route 15 splits into a one-way pair; the eastbound highway heads east one block on Church Street and north one block on Pine Street to Main Street, and westbound Route 15 follows Main Street. Route 15 continues north on two-way Pine Street, then turns east onto Goff Avenue, which briefly expands to a four-lane divided boulevard around its intersection with Route 114 (Broad Street) next to the Pawtucket Elks Lodge Building. The highway continues east on two-lane Exchange Street across the Blackstone River and by the Pawtucket Armory to Broadway. Broadway runs one-way southbound parallel to Interstate 95 (I-95) and US 1. Broadway's northbound complement immediately to the east of I-95 is Underwood Street. Broadway, Cottage Street, Exchange Street, and a crossing of I-95 one block to the south form a traffic circle that includes ramps to both directions of I-95.

Eastbound Route 15 leaves Cottage Street via a ramp to one-way southbound Grove Street, then follows Grove Street to one-way eastbound Armistice Boulevard, which the route follows for three blocks to the end of the one-way pair. Westbound Route 15 splits from Armistice Boulevard at one-way northbound Denver Street, turns west onto one-way westbound Spring Street, then turns onto one-way Exchange Street to Cottage Street. From the eastern end of the one-way pair, Route 15 follows Armistice Street, which is two lanes undivided to a commercial area at its intersection with George Bennett Highway. There, the highway becomes a two-lane divided boulevard. Route 15 intersects US 1A (Newport Avenue) and becomes an undivided highway as it passes Slater Park and crosses the Ten Mile River. The Rhode Island version of Route 15 ends at the Rhode Island–Massachusetts state line at its intersection with Anawan Road.

=== Seekonk, Massachusetts ===
Massachusetts Route 15 continues east along Brook Street a short distance to its eastern terminus at Massachusetts Route 152 (Newman Avenue) in the town of Seekonk.

== Major intersections ==
State	County	Location	mi	km	Destinations	Notes
Rhode Island	Providence	North Providence	0.0	0.0	US 44 east (Smith Street)	Western terminus of eastbound direction
Rhode Island	Providence	North Providence	0.1	0.16	US 44 west (Centerdale Bypass) to Route 104 – Smithfield, Glocester, RI	Western terminus of westbound direction
Rhode Island	Providence	North Providence	1.7	2.7	Route 7 (Douglas Avenue)	
Rhode Island	Providence	North Providence	2.9	4.7	Route 146 south (Louisquisset Pike) to I-95 – Providence	Diamond interchange; exit 2 on Route 146
Rhode Island	Providence	North Providence	3.2	5.1	Route 246 (Charles Street) to Route 146 north – Woonsocket	
Rhode Island	Providence	Pawtucket	3.8	6.1	Route 126 (Smithfield Avenue)	
Rhode Island	Providence	Pawtucket	4.6	7.4	Route 122 (Lonsdale Avenue)	
Rhode Island	Providence	Pawtucket	5.5	8.9	Route 114 (Broad Street) – Central Falls, East Providence	
Rhode Island	Providence	Pawtucket	6.0	9.7	I-95 / US 1 – Providence, Boston, MA	
Rhode Island	Providence	Pawtucket	7.4	11.9	US 1A (Newport Avenue) – East Providence, South Attleboro, MA	
Rhode Island–Massachusetts state line			8.3 0.00	13.4 0.00	Route transition	
Massachusetts	Bristol	Seekonk	0.23	0.37	Route 152 (Newman Avenue) – Attleboro, East Providence, RI	Eastern terminus
1.000 mi = 1.609 km; 1.000 km = 0.621 mi: Route transition
