= Rhode Island Route 7 =

State highway in Providence County, Rhode Island, US

Route 7
- Douglas Pike
- Route 7 highlighted in red

Route information
- Maintained by RIDOT
- Length: 15.7 mi (25.3 km)
- Existed: by 1934–present

Major junctions
- South end: Route 246 in Providence
- Route 146 / I-95 in Providence; I-295 in Smithfield
- North end: Douglas Pike in Burrillville

Location
- Country: United States
- State: Rhode Island
- Counties: Providence

Highway system
- Rhode Island Routes
← US 6A	→ Route 10

Route 7 is a numbered state highway in Rhode Island, United States. It runs approximately 16 miles (26 km) from Route 246 in Providence north to Burrillville.

== Route description ==
Route 7 begins in Providence at an intersection with Route 246, carrying Orms Street in a western direction. As it passes over Route 146, the route meets Douglas Avenue and turns onto it, flanking a residential area. It then enters North Providence and continues for another 1.5 miles (2.4 km), exiting the residential area at Wenscott Reservoir and entering Smithfield. On the reservoir, Route 7 crosses a causeway, becoming the Douglas Pike and retaining that name through the township. The road passes through a heavily wooded area, serving several homes in the area. It expands to four lanes for a short while as it features an interchange with I-295, passing by a shopping center and also intersecting Route 116. North of there, after thinning to two lanes once more, it intersects both Routes 5 and 104, forming a short concurrency with them as they cross each other in North Smithfield. The road continues north to Burrillville, passing through Nasonville, where it makes a right turn and momentarily changes name to Victory Highway; however, that road leaves at the very next intersection. As Douglas Turnpike again, the route crosses Route 102 and continues north to Joslin Road.

The northern terminus of Route 7 is at Joslin Road because that is where state maintenance on the road ends. The paved road continues to the Massachusetts state line. The numbered route does not cross the stateline, but does continue as "Douglas Pike" through the SW corner of Uxbridge, crossing Massachusetts Route 98 and continuing to the center of Douglas.

== Major intersections ==
The entire route is in Providence County.

Location	mi	km	Destinations	Notes
Providence	0.0	0.0	Route 246 (Charles Street) to I-95 north / US 1 / US 44	Southern terminus
Providence	0.3	0.48	Route 146 south to I-95 south / I-195 / US 6 / Route 10	Northbound exit and southbound entrance; exit 23 on Route 146
North Providence	3.1	5.0	Route 15 (Mineral Spring Avenue) – Centredale, Pawtucket	
Smithfield	7.4	11.9	I-295 – Lincoln, Boston, Warwick, New York	Exits 15A-B on I-295
Smithfield	8.2	13.2	Route 116 (Washington Highway) to Route 123	
North Smithfield	10.6	17.1	Route 5 south / Route 104 south (Farum Pike)	Southern end of Route 5/Route 104 concurrency
North Smithfield	10.8	17.4	Route 5 north (Greenville Road) / Route 104 north	Northern end of Route 5/Route 104 concurrency
Burrillville	14.9	24.0	Route 102 (Broncos Highway) – Chepachet, Woonsocket	
Burrillville	15.7	25.3	Douglas Pike – Uxbridge, MA, Douglas, MA	Continuation north to Route 98, Route 16 and Route 96
1.000 mi = 1.609 km; 1.000 km = 0.621 mi: Concurrency terminus; Incomplete access
