= Rhode Island Route 122 =

State highway in Providence County, Rhode Island, US

Route 122
- Route 122 highlighted in red

Route information
- Maintained by RIDOT
- Length: 14.2 mi (22.9 km)

Major junctions
- South end: US 1 in Pawtucket
- I-95 in Pawtucket; Route 116 in Cumberland; I-295 in Cumberland; Route 99 in Woonsocket; Route 114 in Woonsocket
- North end: Route 122 at the Massachusetts state line in Blackstone, MA

Location
- Country: United States
- State: Rhode Island
- Counties: Providence

Highway system
- Rhode Island Routes
← Route 121	→ Route 123

Route 122 is a numbered state highway running 14.2 miles (22.9 km) in Rhode Island, United States. Its southern terminus is at U.S. Route 1 (US 1) in Pawtucket, and its northern terminus is at the Massachusetts border where it continues as Massachusetts Route 122.

== Route description ==
Route 122 takes the following route through the State:

- Pawtucket: 1.6 miles (2.6 km); U.S. 1 to Central Falls city line
  - Main Street and Lonsdale Avenue
- Central Falls: 0.9 miles (1.4 km); Pawtucket city line to Lincoln town line
  - Lonsdale Avenue
- Lincoln: 1.0 mile (1.6 km); Central Falls city line to Cumberland town line
  - Lonsdale Avenue
- Cumberland: 6.9 miles (11.1 km); Lincoln town line to Woonsocket city line
  - Mendon Road
- Woonsocket: 3.8 miles (6.1 km); Cumberland town line to Massachusetts State line at Route 122
  - Mendon Road, Cumberland Hill Road, Hamlet Avenue, Court Street, [High Street] (Main Street, Arnold Street), Arnold Street, Railroad Street and Harris Avenue

== History ==
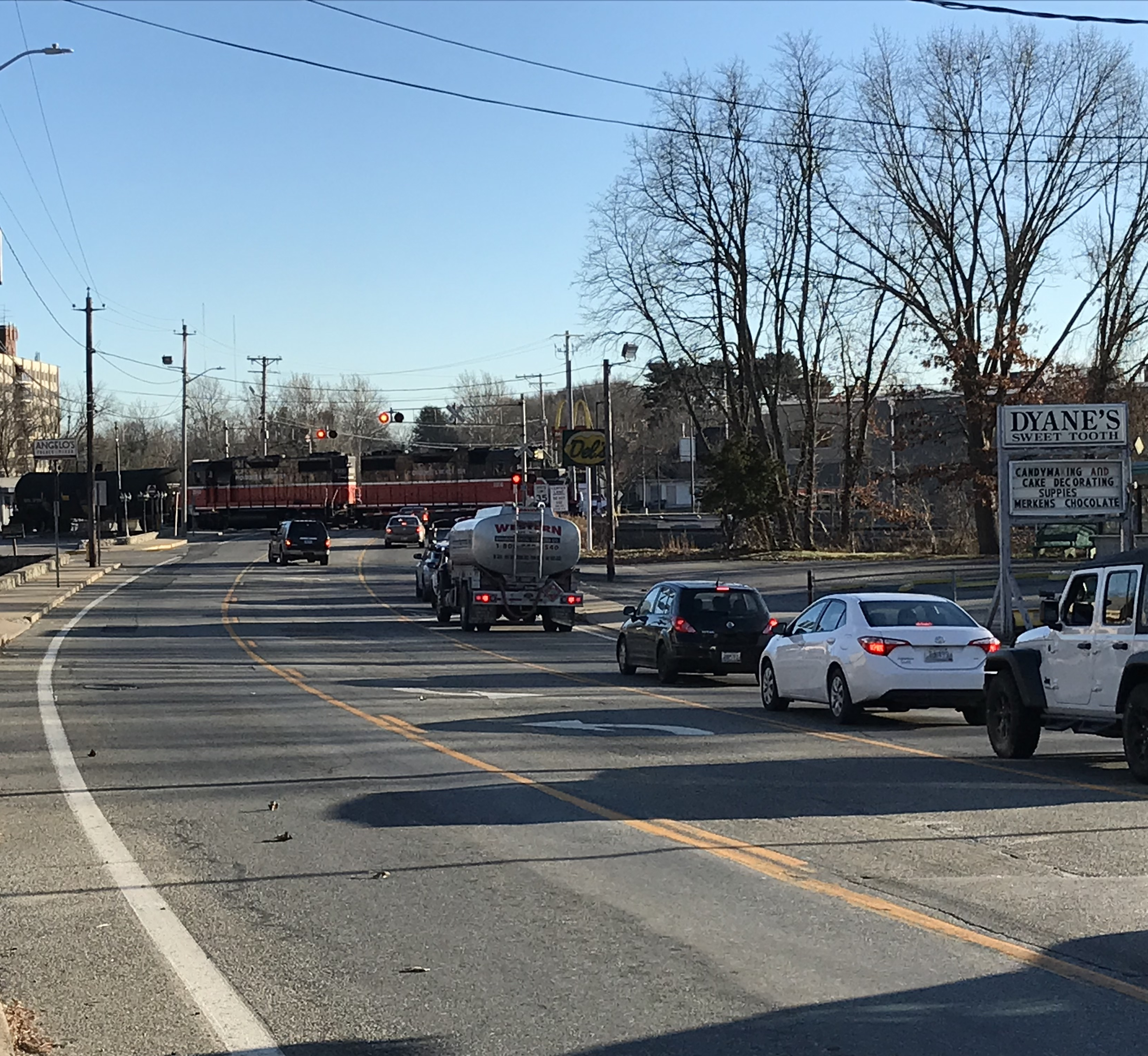
Rhode Island Route 122 in Valley Falls, with a Providence and Worcester Railroad train crossing

Route 122 used to extend south along US 1 into Providence then along Randall Street to end at Charles Street (present-day Route 246).

== Major intersections ==
The entire route is in Providence County.

Location	mi	km	Destinations	Notes
Pawtucket	0.0	0.0	US 1 (Main Street) to Route 246 / US 44	Southern terminus
Pawtucket	1.0	1.6	I-95 south to I-195 / US 6 / Route 10 – Providence, Warwick	Exit 40 on I-95
Pawtucket	1.1	1.8	Route 15 (Mineral Spring Avenue)	
Lincoln	3.5	5.6	Route 123 (John Street)	
Cumberland	6.1	9.8	Route 116 east (Angell Road)	Southern end of Route 116 concurrency
Cumberland	6.3	10.1	Route 116 west (George Washington Highway)	Northern end of Route 116 concurrency
Cumberland	6.8	10.9	I-295 to I-95 / Route 146 – Attleboro, Boston, Johnston, Warwick	Exit 20 on I-295
Cumberland Hill	9.3	15.0	Route 120 east (Nate Whipple Highway)	Western terminus of Route 120
Cumberland Hill–Woonsocket line	10.6	17.1	Route 99 south to I-295 / Route 146	Northern terminus of Route 99
Woonsocket	12.1	19.5	Route 126 south (Hamlet Ave)	Southern end of Route 126 concurrency
Woonsocket	12.4	20.0	Route 126 south (Manville Road)	Northern end of Route 126 concurrency
Woonsocket	13.0	20.9	Route 104 north	Southern end of Route 104 concurrency southboumd
Woonsocket	13.0	20.9	Route 104 north	Northern end of Route 104 concurrency southbound
Woonsocket	13.8	22.2	Route 114 south (Winter Street)	Northern terminus of Route 114
Woonsocket	14.2	22.9	Route 122 north – Worcester	Continuation into Massachusetts
1.000 mi = 1.609 km; 1.000 km = 0.621 mi: Concurrency terminus
