= Rhode Island Route 214 =

State highway in Newport County, Rhode Island, US

Route 214
- Valley Road
- Route 214 highlighted in red

Route information
- Maintained by RIDOT
- Length: 2.2 mi (3.5 km)

Major junctions
- South end: Route 138A in Middletown
- Route 138 in Middletown
- North end: Route 114 in Middletown

Location
- Country: United States
- State: Rhode Island
- Counties: Newport

Highway system
- Rhode Island Routes
← Route 195	→ Route 216

Route 214 is a 2.2-mile-long (3.5 km) state highway in the U.S. state of Rhode Island. Its southern terminus is at Route 138A in Middletown, and its northern terminus is at Route 114 in Middletown.

== Route description ==
Route 214 begins at the intersection of Aquidneck Avenue, which carries Route 138A, and Valley Road in Middletown. Heading north on Valley Road, the highway parallels the eastern short of Green End Pond. North of the pond, the road passes through a residential area before reaching the Main Street commercial district at Route 138. From there, it continues to the north and northwest where it ends at Route 114 (Main Road).

== Major intersections ==
The entire route is in Middletown, Newport County.

mi	km	Destinations	Notes
0.0	0.0	Route 138A (Aquidneck Avenue)	Southern terminus
0.8	1.3	Green End Avenue	
1.7	2.7	Route 138 (East Main Street)	
2.2	3.5	Route 114 (West Main Road)	Northern terminus
1.000 mi = 1.609 km; 1.000 km = 0.621 mi
