= Providence Viaduct =

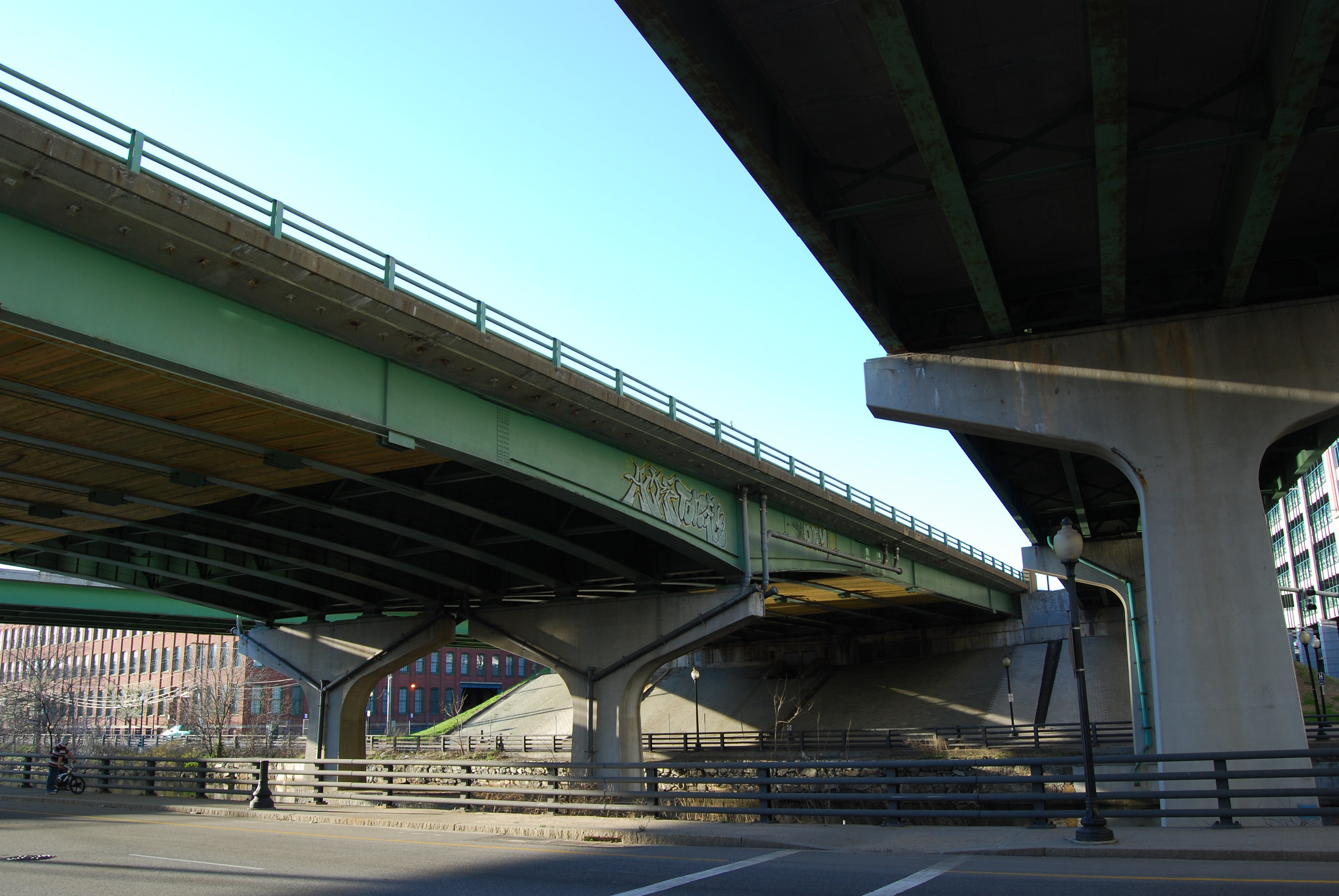
- View of Providence Viaduct (on left).
- Coordinates: 41.8278°N 71.4183°W
- Carries: I-95 / I-195 / US 6 / Route 146
- Crosses: Woonasquatucket River, Amtrak lines, West Exchange St.
- Maintained by: RIDOT

History
- Opened: 1964; 61 years ago

The Providence Viaduct refers to the two 4-lane bridges in each direction of Interstate 95 (I-95) that passes through downtown Providence, Rhode Island, in the United States. The structure passes over the Woonasquatucket River and Amtrak lines. It also connects with Interstate 195, U.S. Route 6 (US 6), and Route 146. The bridge was built in 1964 and rehabilitated in 1992.

As of June 2012, the bridge is functionally obsolete and rapidly deteriorating. Several of the support beams have crumbled significantly to reveal the steel girders underneath. Additionally, the lower part of the deck has had to be boarded to prevent fragments of the bridge from landing on the streets and railway tracks under the viaduct. In 2019, the State secured $200 Million to rebuild and widen parts of the Viaduct.

Given the number of major roads that merge on the Providence Viaduct (I-95, I-195, US 6, and Route 146) and its poor layout, it has frequent accidents and is responsible for much of the traffic jams on I-95.
