= John G. Hardy =

American sculptor

John Gabriel Hardy, Senior, (unknown dates) was an American sculptor best known for his memorials to veterans of the American Civil War and World War I. He was active in Providence and Warwick, Rhode Island.

== Selected works ==
- Memorial to Maj. Gen. John Sullivan, c. 1909
- Crozier Presented to Bishop Thomas J. Shahan, c. 1915
- Soldiers Monument, Centredale, Rhode Island, 1919
- "Remembrance Monument", World War I Memorial, Templeton, Massachusetts, 1922
- "Over the Top", World War I Memorial, Warwick, Rhode Island, 1922
- "Carry On", World War I Memorial, North Providence, Rhode Island, 1922
- Lest We Forget", Harrisburg, Pennsylvania and Marlborough, Massachusetts, 1923
- Major Thomas McManus Plaque, Hartford, Connecticut, 1923
- "Congressional Medal of Honor (Valor)", Massachusetts State House, 1924
