= Numbered routes in Rhode Island =

Numbered Routes in Rhode Island
- Standard Rhode Island route shields

System information
- Maintained by RIDOT.
- Notes: Routes are generally state-maintained.

Highway names
- Interstates: Interstate X (I-X)
- US Highways: U.S Route X (US X or Route X)
- State: Route X

System links
- Rhode Island Routes

The U.S. state of Rhode Island has 70 state highways, coordinated and signed by the Rhode Island Department of Transportation (RIDOT). Most of these are partly or fully state highways, roads owned and maintained by RIDOT. Every city and town in Rhode Island, except for New Shoreham (Block Island), has at least one numbered route.

== History ==
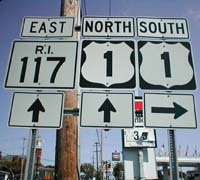
Route 117 at U.S. Route 1 in Warwick

State highways in Rhode Island are signed with a standard square shield (for 2-digit routes) or a rectangular shield (for 3-digit routes), with black digits on a white background. The state initials of R.I. are placed above the number, as seen in the adjacent picture. The shields are similar to that of neighboring Massachusetts, though that state's route signs contain only the number. On some older highway signs, state route shields occasionally omit the "R.I." above the number, but most newer signage (particularly along I-95) features the state initials.

== Interstate Highways ==
Number	Length (mi)	Length (km)	Southern or western terminus	Northern or eastern terminus	Formed	Removed	Notes
I-82	—	—	—	—	1956	1968	Original designation for unbuilt I-84
I-84	—	—	—	—	1968	1982	Never built; cancelled due to environmental concerns with Scituate Reservoir
I-95	43.3	69.7	I-95 in North Stonington, CT	I-95 in Attleboro, MA	1968	current	
I-95E	—	—	—	—	1952	1952	Now I-195
I-195	3.82	6.15	I-95/US 6 in Providence	I-195 in Seekonk, MA	1952	current	
I-295	22.8	36.7	I-95 in Warwick	I-295 in North Attleborough, MA	1968	current	
I-895	35.3	56.8	Route 37 in Cranston	I-895 in Attleboro, MA	1968	1978	Never Built
Former

== U.S. Highways ==
=== Main Routes ===
Number	Length (mi)	Length (km)	Southern or western terminus	Northern or eastern terminus	Formed	Removed	Notes
US 1	57.0	91.7	US 1 in Stonington, CT	US 1 in Attleboro, MA	1926	current	Mostly follows the old New England Route 1
US 6	26.5	42.6	US 6 in Killingly, CT	US 6 in Seekonk, MA	1926	current	Mostly follows the old New England Route 3
US 44	26.3	42.3	US 44 in Putnam, CT	US 44 in Seekonk, MA	1935	current	

=== Auxiliary Routes ===
Number	Length (mi)	Length (km)	Southern or western terminus	Northern or eastern terminus	Formed	Removed	Notes
US 1A	14.4	23.2	US 1 in Warwick	Route 1A in Attleboro, MA	1994	current	
US 6A	3.7	6.0	US 6 in Johnston	US 6 in Providence	1991	current	

== Rhode Island Routes ==
Number	Length (mi)	Length (km)	Southern or western terminus	Northern or eastern terminus	Formed	Removed	Notes
Route 1A	40.1	64.5	US 1 in Westerly	US 1 in Providence	1927	1934	Mostly follows the old New England Route 1A, renumbered to Route 3 and Route 2 in 1934
Route 1A	38.3	61.6	US 1 in Westerly	US 1 in North Kingstown	1934	current	Scenic route
Route 1A	14.4	23.2	US 1 in Warwick	Route 1A in Attleboro, MA	1933	current	Had been signed as US Route 1A until around 2015.
Route 1B	19.0	30.6	US 1 in Wakefield	US 1 in Wickford	1923	1934	Was the 19-mile part of today's Route 1A, which ran from Wakefield to Wickford
Route 1C	3.0	4.8	US 1 in Apponaug	Route 2 in Cranston	1919	1934	The 3-mile portion of today's Route 5, which ran from its current terminus in Warwick to Route 2 in Cranston
Route 2	33.6	54.1	US 1/Route 112 in Charlestown	US 1 in Providence	1934	current	
Route 3	30.1	48.4	US 1 in Westerly	Route 2 in Warwick	1935	current	
Route 3A	6.8	10.9	—	—	—	c. 1939	Renumbered To Route 33
Route 4	10.4	16.7	US 1 in North Kingstown	I-95 in Warwick	1965	current	
Route 5	25.7	41.4	US 1/Route 117 in Warwick	Central Street in Millville, MA	1934	current	Section north of Route 102 to the state line in North Smithfield is not signed.
Route 7	15.7	25.3	Route 246 in Providence	Joslin Road in Burrillville	1934	current	
Route 10	5.0	8.0	Route 12 in Providence	I-95/US 6 in Providence	1966	current	
Route 11	1.0	1.6	—	—	1933	1963	Was Route 142 from early 1920s-1933. Renumbered to Route 11 in 1933, renumbered to Route 121 in mid 1960s.
Route 12	17.0	27.4	Route 14/Route 102 in Scituate	Broad Street in Cranston	c. 1932	current	
Route 14	23.1	37.2	Route 14/Route 14A in Sterling, CT	US 6 in Providence	c. 1932	current	
Route 15	8.3	13.4	US 44 in North Providence	Route 15 in Seekonk, MA	1964	current	
Route 24	7.7	12.4	Route 114 in Portsmouth	Route 24 in Fall River, MA	1966	current	
Route 33	6.8	10.9	Route 3 in Coventry	Route 2 in Cranston	1957	current	
Route 37	3.5	5.6	Natick Avenue in Cranston	US 1 in Warwick	1963	current	
Route 51	5.4	8.7	Route 115 in West Warwick	Route 12 in Cranston	1979	current	
Route 77	14.3	23.0	Rhode Island Road in Little Compton	Route 138 in Tiverton	1964	current	
Route 78	4.2	6.8	Route 78 in Stonington	US 1 in Westerly	1979	current	
Route 81	8.0	12.9	Route 179 in Little Compton	Route 81 in Fall River, MA	1981	current	
Route 84	1.1	1.8	—	—	1955	1958	Replaced by Route 95, which was replaced by I-95
Route 91	12.0	19.3	Route 3 in Westerly	Route 112 in Carolina	1962	current	
Route 94	12.7	20.4	Route 14/Route 102 in Foster	US 44 in Chepachet	1952	current	
Route 95	42.36	68.17	—	—	1958	1968	Placemarker for I-95 prior to completion as a freeway
Route 96	3.8	6.1	Route 98 in Burrillville	Route 96 in Douglas, MA	1938	current	
Route 98	6.1	9.8	Route 100 in Chepachet	Route 98 in Uxbridge, MA	1938	current	
Route 99	2.9	4.7	Route 146 in Lincoln	Route 122 in Woonsocket	1993	current	
Route 100	9.3	15.0	Route 102 in Glocester	Wallum Lake Road in Douglas, MA	1939	current	
Route 101	—	—	—	—	1922	1934	Became part of US 44
Route 101	9.7	15.6	Route 101 in Killingly, CT	US 6 in Scituate	1935	current	
Route 102	44.4	71.5	Route 1A in North Kingstown	Route 5/Route 146A in Slatersville	1923	current	
Route 103	11.8	19.0	I-195 in East Providence	Route 103 in Swansea, MA	1923	current	
Route 103A	2.0	3.2	Route 103 in Riverside	Route 103 in Barrington	1982	current	
Route 104	13.4	21.6	US 44 in North Providence	Worrall Street in Woonsocket	1923	current	
Route 107	—	—	—	—	1919	1932	Was on the opposite side of the state
Route 107	3.9	6.3	Route 100 in Pascoag	Victory Highway in Burrillville	1934	current	
Route 108	—	—	—	—	1919	1934	
Route 108	8.6	13.8	Ocean Road in Point Judith	Route 138 in Kingston	1934	current	
Route 110	6.1	9.8	US 1 in South Kingstown	Route 138 in West Kingston	1969	current	
Route 112	8.5	13.7	US 1 in Charlestown	Route 138 in Richmond	1923	current	
Route 113	3.4	5.5	Route 2 in Warwick	Route 117 in Warwick	1969	current	
Route 114	45.7	73.5	Route 138 in Middletown	Route 122 in Woonsocket	1923	current	
Route 114A	0.4	0.64	Route 114 in East Providence	US 1A/Route 114 in East Providence	c. 1960	current	Most of the road is located within Seekonk, MA and designated as Massachusetts Route 114A.
Route 115	6.4	10.3	Route 116 in Hope	Route 117 in Warwick	1956	current	
Route 116	25.1	40.4	Route 33/Route 117 in Coventry	Route 114 in Cumberland	1923	current	
Route 117	28.4	45.7	Route 14 in Coventry	US 1A in Cranston	1922	current	
Route 117A	2.3	3.7	Route 117 in Warwick	Route 117 in Warwick	1980	current	
Route 118	5.5	8.9	Route 102 in Coventry	Route 3 in Coventry	2000	current	
Route 120	4.3	6.9	Route 122 in Cumberland	Route 120 in North Attleborough, MA	1968	current	
Route 121	1.0	1.6	Route 114 in Cumberland	Route 121 in Wrentham, MA	1963	current	
Route 122	14.2	22.9	US 1 in Pawtucket	Route 122 in Blackstone, MA	1934	current	
Route 123	7.8	12.6	Route 116 in Lincoln	Route 123 in Attleboro, MA	1923	current	
Route 126	—	—	Route 179/Route 81 in Tiverton	Route 138 in Little Compton	1912	1962	Was in Little Compton to Tiverton Now moved north
Route 126	14.3	23.0	US 1 in Providence	Route 126 in Blackstone, MA	1962	current	
Route 128	3.1	5.0	US 6A in Providence	US 44 in Johnston	1923	current	
Route 136	7.4	11.9	Route 114 in Bristol	Route 136 in Swansea, MA	1956	current	
Route 138	48.3	77.7	Route 138 in Voluntown, CT	Route 138 in Fall River, MA	1920	current	
Route 138A	4.1	6.6	Route 138 in Newport	Route 138 in Middletown	1967	current	Extended in 2023 to absorb routing of Route 238.
Route 142	1.0	1.6	Route 122 in Woonsocket	Route 142 in Wrentham, MA	1919	1933	Renumbered Route 11
Route 146	16.2	26.1	I-95 in Providence	Route 146 in Millville, MA	c. 1920	current	
Route 146A	5.9	9.5	Route 146 in North Smithfield	Route 146A in Uxbridge, MA	1985	current	
Route 152	0.5	0.80	US 1A/Route 114 in East Providence	Route 152 in Seekonk, MA	1956	current	
Route 165	7.1	11.4	Route 165 in Voluntown, CT	Route 3 in Exeter	1932	current	
Route 177	3.5	5.6	Route 77 in Tiverton	Route 177 in Westport, MA	1923	current	
Route 179	3.5	5.6	Route 77 in Tiverton	Route 81 in Little Compton	1962	current	
Route 195	4.5	7.2	—	—	1971	1992	Was to be part of I-84 and later I-195. Was co-signed as By-pass US 6 until 1992.
Route 214	2.2	3.5	Route 138A in Middletown	Route 114 in Middletown	1967	current	
Route 216	8.1	13.0	US 1 in Charlestown	Route 216 in North Stonington, CT	1934	current	
Route 238	1.4	2.3	Route 138A in Newport	Route 138 in Newport	1956	2023	Retired route, its entire alignment was added to Route 138A, although signs from this route were never removed.
Route 246	8.0	12.9	US 1 in Providence	Route 116 in Lincoln	1984	current	
Route 401	2.5	4.0	Route 2 in East Greenwich	US 1 in East Greenwich	1956	current	
Route 402	1.2	1.9	Route 2 in East Greenwich	US 1 in North Kingstown	1998	current	
Route 403	4.5	7.2	Route 4 in East Greenwich	Commerce Park Way in North Kingstown	2009	current	
Former

== See also ==
- 19th century turnpikes in Rhode Island
- Downtown Circulator (Pawtucket)
- New England Interstate Routes
