= Rhode Island Route 5 =

State highway in Rhode Island, US

Route 5
- Route 5 highlighted in red

Route information
- Maintained by RIDOT
- Length: 25.7 mi (41.4 km)
- Existed: by 1934–present

Major junctions
- South end: US 1 in Warwick
- Route 2 in Cranston US 6 / I-295 in Johnston; US 44 in Smithfield Route 102 / Route 146A in North Smithfield
- North end: Central Street in Millville, MA

Location
- Country: United States
- State: Rhode Island
- Counties: Kent, Providence

Highway system
- Rhode Island Routes
← Route 4	→ US 6
← Route 1B	→ Route 2

Route 5 is a state highway in the U.S. state of Rhode Island. It runs approximately 26 miles (42 km) from US 1 in Warwick to the Massachusetts state line in North Smithfield.

== Route description ==
Route 5 starts at US 1 in Warwick near Gorton Pond. It runs north over I-95 without an interchange before intersecting Route 2 in Cranston. It continues north, generally paralleling I-295. After passing US 44 near Greenville, Route 5 crosses the Stillwater Reservoir on a short causeway. Continuing north, Route 5 has a short concurrency with Route 7, and it continues to North Smithfield. Route 5 crosses the Route 146 expressway without an interchange and terminates at the Massachusetts state line, though the northernmost Route 5 shields are around Route 102 at the south end of the Route 146A concurrency.

== History ==

Route 5 was once numbered Route 1C along the 3.0 miles (4.8 km) between its south end at U.S. Route 1 (New England Interstate Route 1 before 1926) and Route 2 (originally Route 1A). It was renumbered Route 5 and extended north by 1934.

== Major intersections ==
County	Location	mi	km	Destinations	Notes
Kent	Warwick	0.0	0.0	US 1 / Route 117 (Post Road)	Southern terminus
Kent	Warwick	1.2	1.9	Route 113 (East Avenue) to I-95	
Providence	Cranston	3.0	4.8	Route 2 (New London Avenue) to Route 33	Interchange
Providence	Cranston	5.7	9.2	Cranston Street	Roundabout
Providence	Cranston	6.1	9.8	Route 12 (Phenix Avenue)	
Providence	Cranston	7.4	11.9	Route 14 (Plainfield Street)	
Providence	Johnston	9.1	14.6	US 6	Interchange
Providence	Johnston	9.6	15.4	US 6A (Hartford Avenue)	
Providence	Greenville	13.8	22.2	US 44 (Putnam Pike)	
Providence	Smithfield	14.8	23.8	Route 116 south (Pleasant View Avenue)	South end of concurrency with Route 116
Providence	Smithfield	16.6	26.7	Route 104 south (Farnum Pike)	South end of concurrency with Route 104
Providence	Smithfield	16.8	27.0	Route 116 north (Washington Highway)	North end of concurrency with Route 116
Providence	North Smithfield	19.4	31.2	Route 7 south (Douglas Pike)	South end of concurrency with Route 7
Providence	North Smithfield	19.6	31.5	Route 7 north (Douglas Pike)	North end of concurrency with Route 7
Providence	North Smithfield	20.9	33.6	Route 104 north (Greenville Road)	North end of concurrency with Route 104
Providence	North Smithfield	25.1	40.4	Route 102 south / Route 146A south (Victory Highway) to Route 146	South end of concurrency with Route 146A, Northern terminus of Route 102
Providence	North Smithfield	25.3	40.7	Route 146A north (Quaker Highway)	North end of concurrency with Route 146A
Providence	North Smithfield	25.7	41.4	Central Street north to Route 122	Massachusetts border
1.000 mi = 1.609 km; 1.000 km = 0.621 mi: Concurrency terminus
