= Rhode Island Route 99 =

State highway in Providence County, Rhode Island, US

Route 99
- Woonsocket Industrial Highway
- Route 99 highlighted in red

Route information
- Maintained by RIDOT
- Length: 2.9 mi (4.7 km)
- Existed: 1993–present

Major junctions
- South end: Route 146 in Lincoln
- North end: Route 122 in Woonsocket

Location
- Country: United States
- State: Rhode Island
- Counties: Providence

Highway system
- Rhode Island Routes
← Route 98	→ Route 100

Route 99, also known as the Woonsocket Industrial Highway, is a 2.9-mile-long (4.7 km) freeway in Providence County, Rhode Island, United States. Route 99 serves Manville and the Highland Industrial Park, providing freeway access to the city of Woonsocket from Rhode Island Route 146, which bypasses the city. The southern terminus of Route 99 is at a partial interchange with Route 146 in Lincoln. The freeway has one interchange in Manville, a village in Lincoln, before terminating at an at-grade intersection with Rhode Island Route 122 in Woonsocket.

Originally conceived as a freeway linking Route 146 and Interstate 295 with Interstate 495 in Bellingham, Massachusetts, Route 99 was constructed primarily to provide freeway access to Woonsocket and the developing Highland Industrial Park. Although originally proposed to serve Downtown Woonsocket, an alternate routing that terminated at Route 122 and ran closer to the Woonsocket–Cumberland border was later constructed by the Rhode Island Department of Transportation (RIDOT). The four-lane freeway began construction in 1987 and was completed in 1993. RIDOT has long-range plans to extend Route 99 north to Route 114 in Downtown Woonsocket, but plans for a northerly extension to I-495 have been abandoned.

== Route description ==
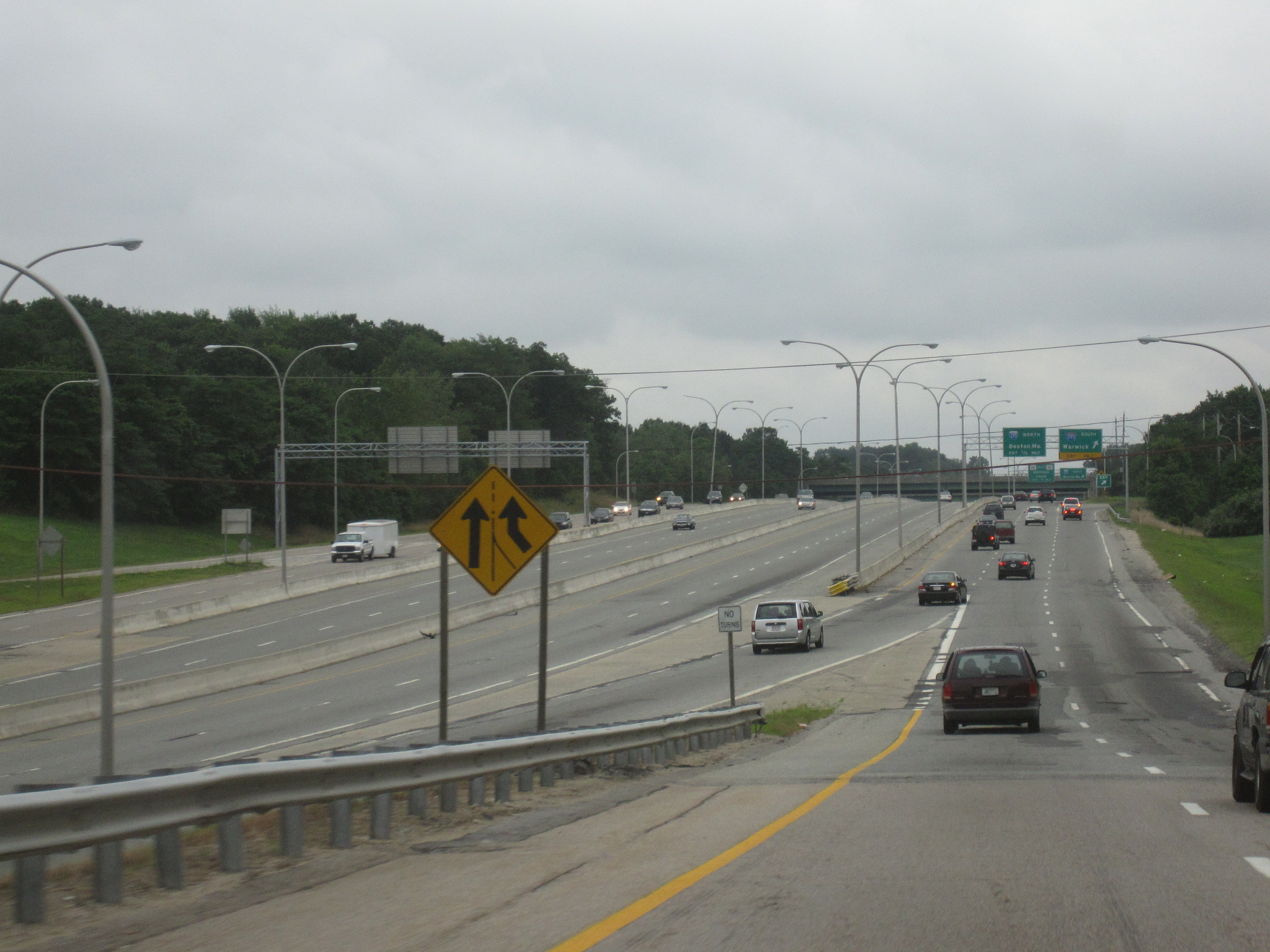
Southern terminus of Route 99 in Lincoln

Route 99 begins at a partial interchange with Route 146 in Lincoln; the route is only accessible from Route 146 north, and the mainline of Route 99 south defaults onto Route 146 south with no direct access to Route 146 north. The exit for Route 99 off Route 146 north is accessed via a collector road that also serves Interstate 295 from Route 146; I-295 has an alignment slightly south of Route 99 but has no direct interchange with it.

Route 99 north diverges from Route 146 north and heads in an almost due north direction. The freeway has its only interchange with Sayles Hill Road, an unnumbered road that is used to access the village of Manville and Route 126 (Old River Road). Sayles Hill Road is also used to access Route 146 north, which has no direct freeway connection with Route 99 south.

After the Sayles Hill Road interchange, Route 99 begins to head in a northeastern direction, passing to the west of the densely populated village of Manville and the St. James Cemetery. Route 99 passes over Route 126 (Old River Road), Railroad Street, and the Providence and Worcester Railroad on a single-span bridge before crossing over the Blackstone River into the town of Cumberland. The freeway passes over 2nd Avenue before entering the city of Woonsocket shortly before its northern terminus at a traffic signal with Route 122 (Mendon Road). The road continues northward as Highland Corporate Drive, an unnumbered route that enters the Highland Industrial Park.

== History ==
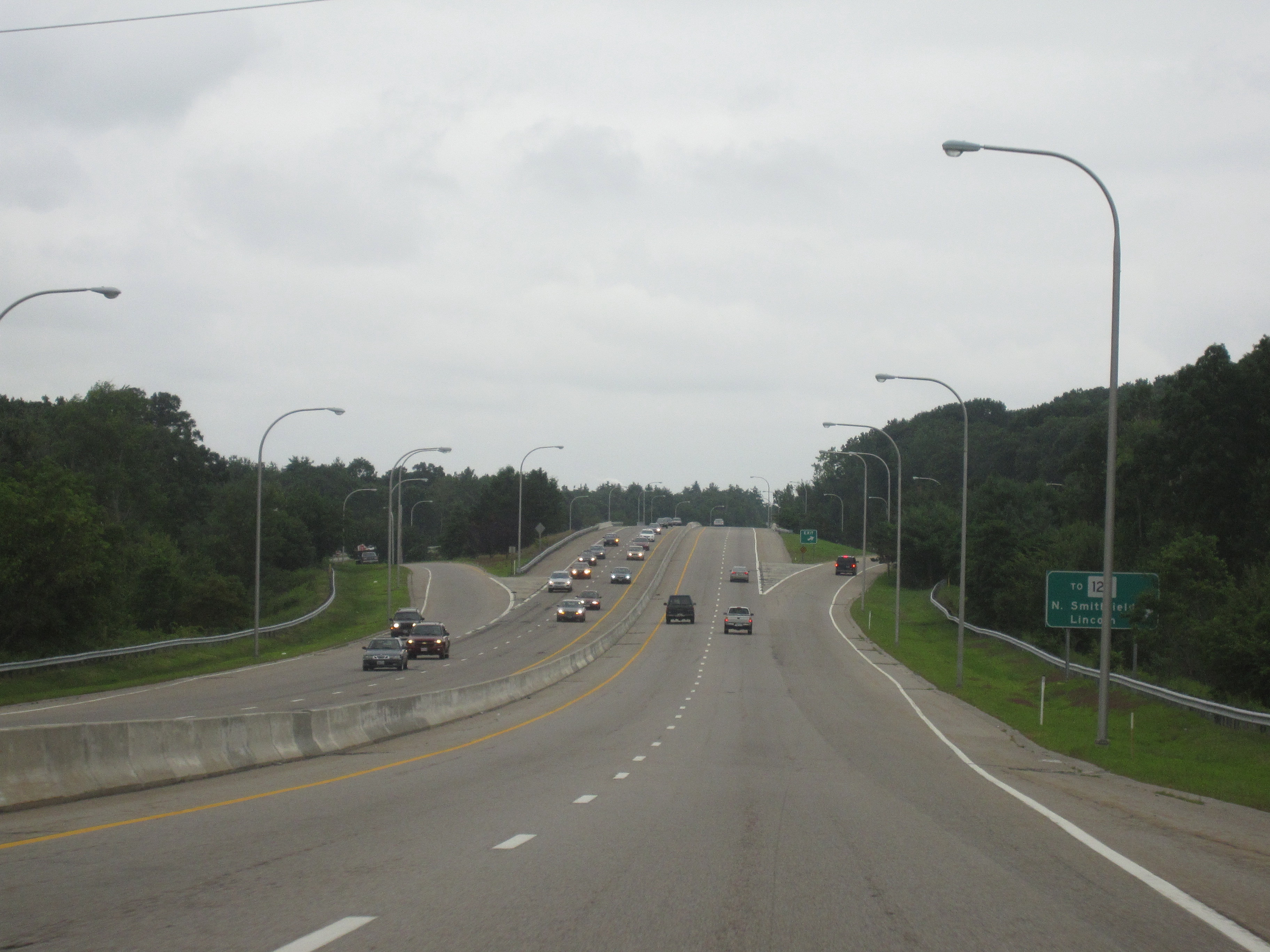
Northbound Route 99 approaching the Sayles Hill Road interchange in Lincoln

The origins of Route 99 date back to 1959, when the Rhode Island Department of Public Works (RIDPW) began planning studies for a freeway linking I-95 in Pawtucket with the city of Woonsocket. The freeway was planned in addition to Route 146, the Louisquisset Expressway, to serve the cities and towns of northern Providence County. In 1964, $535,000 (1964 USD) was allocated for further planning studies, but the proposed freeway was ultimately dropped by RIDPW. In 1968, plans for a freeway were revived when the Massachusetts Department of Public Works proposed the construction of a "Woonsocket Connector" linking Woonsocket with Bellingham, Massachusetts and I-495 on a route similar to that of Massachusetts Route 126.

In 1971, RIDOT again began studies on a new freeway to Woonsocket, this time to connect the city's developing industrial parks to Route 146, I-295, and the rest of the Providence metropolitan area. Four different alignments were proposed for the new route, each beginning near the intersection of Route 146 and I-295 and ending near Downtown Woonsocket. The first proposal began the freeway at the intersection of Route 146 and Route 104 in North Smithfield, north of I-295. The freeway would have taken a northeast route to the downtown area. The second proposal began the freeway near the intersection of Route 146 and Route 146A in North Smithfield; this route would have also taken a northeastern route to the border between Woonsocket and the town of Cumberland. The third proposal called for a similar route to the Cumberland border, but had the freeway beginning at the intersection of Route 146 and Sayles Hill Road in the North Smithfield business district. Finally, the fourth alignment called for the freeway to begin just north of the Route 146 and I-295 interchange in Lincoln, with a northern route heading to either Downtown Woonsocket or the Cumberland–Woonsocket border. RIDOT eventually constructed the fourth alignment, with the freeway beginning north of the I-295 interchange and proceeding north to the border between Woonsocket and Cumberland. The route was assigned the number "Route 325" by RIDOT.

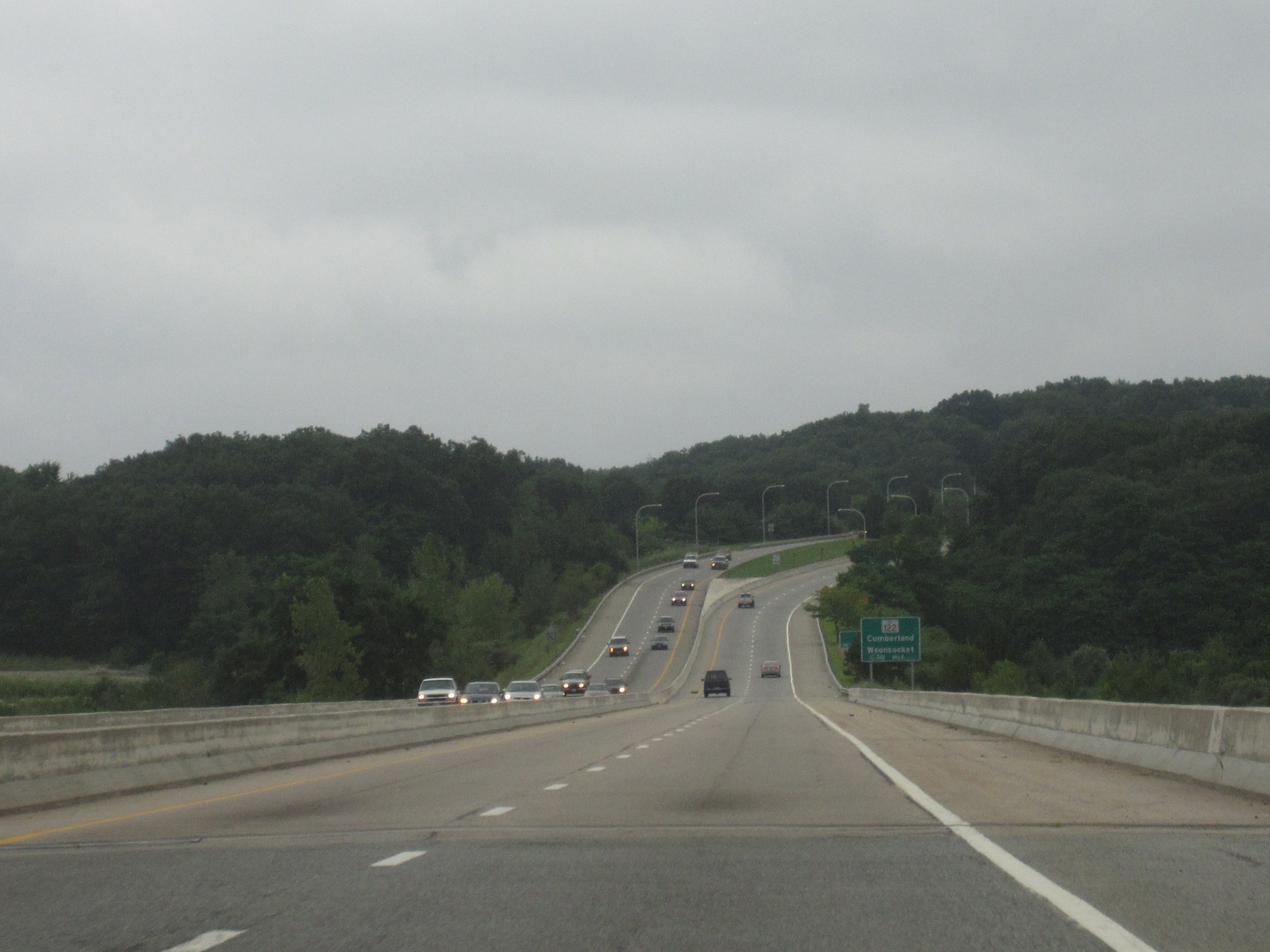
Northbound Route 99 in Lincoln looking toward the Blackstone River Bridge

RIDOT conducted further planning and environmental studies in the 1970s, proposing to construct the four-lane freeway with a dual carriageway and a 65-foot (20 m) landscaped median. The freeway would be constructed over a 400-foot (122 m) right-of-way, running through mostly undeveloped land in the Blackstone River Valley. RIDOT planned to construct the highway first as a two-lane freeway to be upgraded at a later date.

Further environmental studies in the late 1980s altered the plans for the construction of the Woonsocket Industrial Highway; after studies indicated that the freeway, as originally planned, would interfere with the water supply for the city of Woonsocket, RIDOT revised the proposal, removing the large median and reducing the right-of-way. The freeway was instead planned with a 150-foot (46 m) right-of-way and concrete barriers to separate the opposing traffic lanes. The plan to open the highway as a two-lane freeway was also abandoned; instead, all four lanes would be constructed at one time. In the 1980s, the planned Route 325 was also renumbered to Route 99. Construction on Route 99 began in 1987. The project, which included the construction of a four-lane bridge over the Providence and Worcester Railroad and the Blackstone River and new collector/distributor roads on Route 146 between I-295 and Route 99, was completed in 1993.

== Future ==
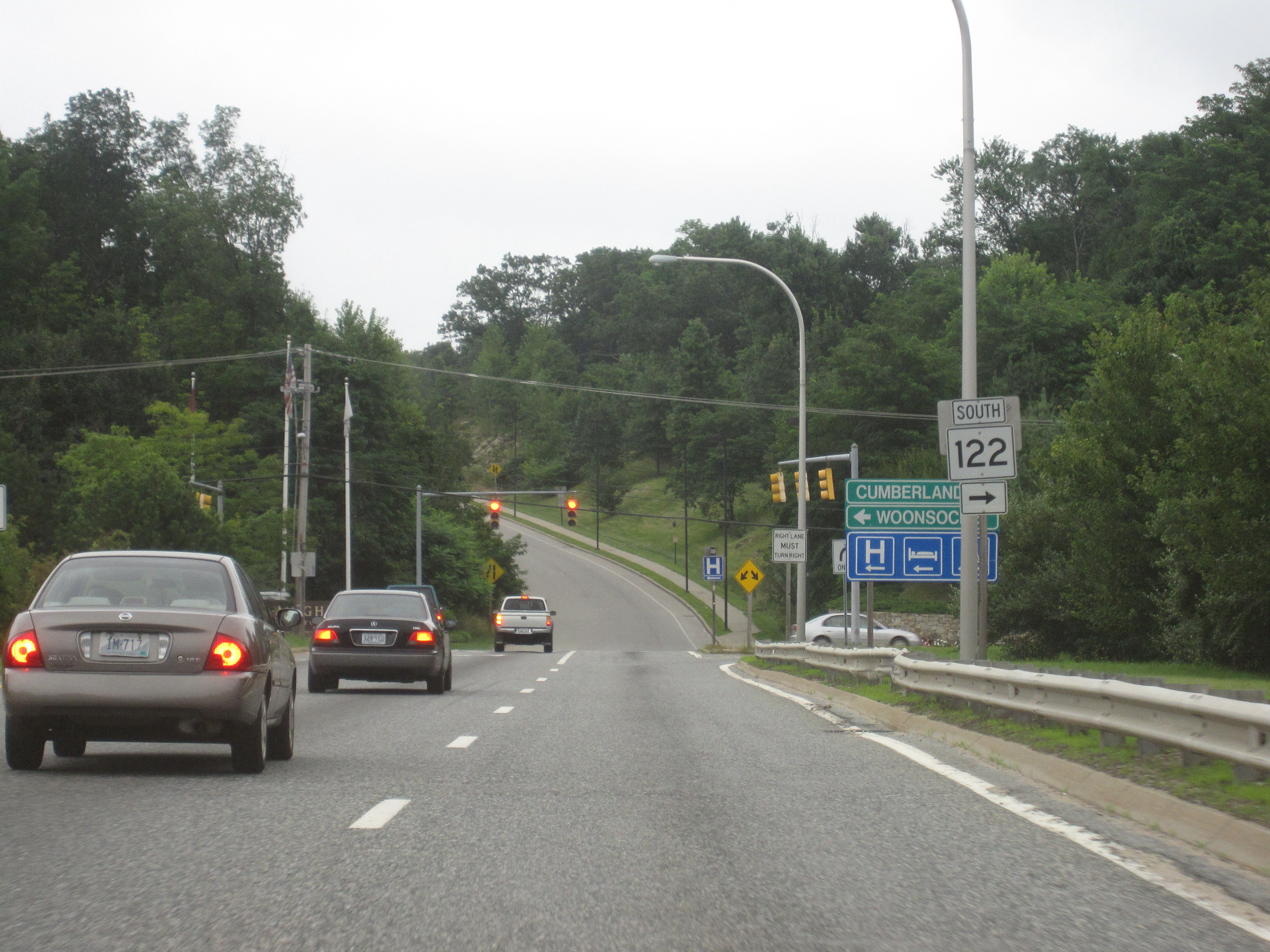
Northern terminus of Route 99 in Woonsocket

The proposal to extend the Woonsocket freeway north to I-495 in Bellingham was placed on RIDOT long-range planning studies in 1971, resurrecting the proposal made by the Massachusetts Department of Public Works in the 1960s. Throughout the 1980s, RIDOT planned the alignment or Route 99 to allow for a northern extension of the freeway beyond Route 122. In 1977, however, RIDOT officially abandoned plans for an extension north to Bellingham, Massachusetts and I-495, instead opting for a shorter route that would extend the freeway north to Route 114 (Diamond Hill Road) in northern Woonsocket. The freeway extension remains on RIDOT's long-term plans.

== Exit list ==
Exits were unnumbered until November 2017, when they were added as part of a project to convert exits in the state to mileage-based exit numbers, a federal highway standard The entire route is in Providence County.

Location	mi	km	Exit	Destinations	Notes
Lincoln	0.0	0.0	–	Route 146 south to I-295 / Route 116 – Warwick, Boston, MA	Southern terminus; exit 8C on Route 146
Lincoln	1.2	1.9	1	Lincoln, North Smithfield	Access via Sayles Hill Road
Blackstone River	2.2	3.5	Bridge		
Woonsocket	2.9	4.7	–	Route 122 – Woonsocket, Cumberland	Northern terminus; at-grade intersection
1.000 mi = 1.609 km; 1.000 km = 0.621 mi

== See also ==
- Rhode Island Route 403
