= Rhode Island Route 116 =

State highway in Providence County, Rhode Island, US

Route 116
- Route 116 highlighted in red

Route information
- Maintained by RIDOT
- Length: 25.1 mi (40.4 km)

Major junctions
- South end: Route 33 / Route 117 in Coventry
- US 6 in Scituate; US 44 in Greenville; Route 146 in Lincoln
- North end: Route 114 in Cumberland

Location
- Country: United States
- State: Rhode Island
- Counties: Providence

Highway system
- Rhode Island Routes
← Route 115	→ Route 117

Route 116 is a state highway running 25.1 miles (40.4 km) in Providence County, and Kent County, Rhode Island. Its southern terminus is at Route 33 and Route 117 in Coventry, and its northern terminus is at Route 114 in Cumberland.

== Route description ==
Route 116 begins at an intersection with RI-33 and RI-117 in Coventry, Rhode Island. It is known as Knotty Oak Road. Route 116 runs north for 2.7 miles (4.3 km) from Route 117 to the Scituate town line. In Scituate, the route runs 9.5 miles (15.3 km). The highway intersects the following routes from south to north: Route 115, Route 12, Route 14, and US 6. In Glocester, the route runs 0.6 miles (0.97 km). It reaches US 44 in Smithfield. It runs concurrent with US 44 for half a mile. Then, it turns northeast. It continues as Pleasant View Avenue as it then meets Route 104. It runs concurrently north with Route 104, then turns east as the George Washington Highway. The George Washington Highway is a rural, two-laned expressway with a 50 mph speed limit. The road continues east and ends at Route 114 in Cumberland.

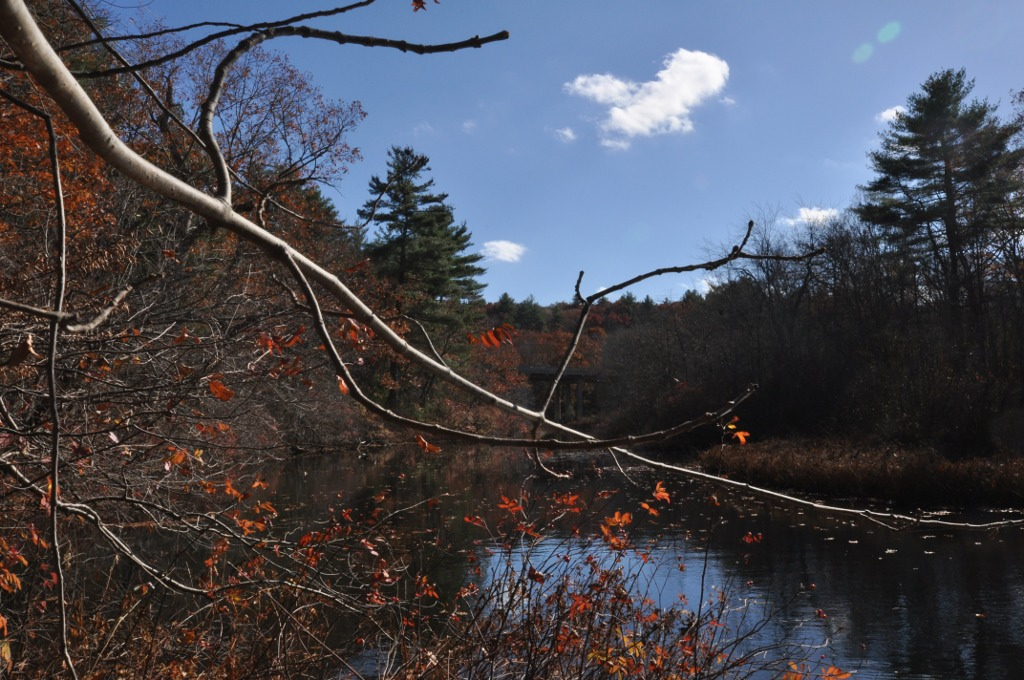
The Route 116 (Washington Highway) bridge over the Woonasquatucket River is visible in the background

== Major intersections ==
County	Location	mi	km	Destinations	Notes
Kent	Coventry	0.0	0.0	Route 33 / Route 117 (Washington Street)	Southern terminus
Providence	Hope	2.9	4.7	Route 115 east (Main Street)	Western terminus of Route 115
Providence	Scituate	4.9	7.9	Route 12 (Scituate Avenue)	
Providence	Scituate	6.9	11.1	Route 14 (Plainfield Pike)	
Providence	North Scituate	10.7	17.2	US 6 (Hartford Pike)	
Providence	Greenville	14.0	22.5	US 44 west (Putnam Pike)	Southern terminus of concurrency with US 44
Providence	Greenville	14.1	22.7	US 44 east (Putnam Pike)	Northern terminus of concurrency with US 44
Providence	Greenville	15.0	24.1	Route 5 south (Cedar Swamp Road)	Southern terminus of concurrency with Route 5
Providence	Smithfield	16.8	27.0	Route 104 south (Farum Pike)	Southern terminus of concurrency with Route 104
Providence	Smithfield	17.0	27.4	Route 5 north / Route 104 north (Farum Pike)	Northern terminus of concurrency with Routes 5 and 104
Providence	Smithfield	18.3	29.5	Route 7 (Douglas Pike)	
Providence	Lincoln	21.4	34.4	Route 146 to I-295 / Route 99 / Route 246	Interchange; exit 7 on Route 146
Providence	Lincoln	22.2	35.7	Route 126 (Old River Road)	
Providence	Blackstone River	23.1	37.2	Bridge	
Providence	Cumberland	23.3	37.5	Route 122 north (Mendon Road) to I-295	Southern terminus of concurrency with Route 122
Providence	Cumberland	23.4	37.7	Route 122 south (Mendon Road)	Southern terminus of concurrency with Route 122
Providence	Cumberland	25.1	40.4	Route 114 (Diamond Hill Road)	Northern terminus
1.000 mi = 1.609 km; 1.000 km = 0.621 mi: Concurrency terminus

== Notes ==
Route 116 is a major corridor in Lincoln, Cumberland and parts of Smithfield.

The interchange between Route 116 and Route 146 was the first cloverleaf interchange to be constructed in the state. In the mid-2000s the ramps in the interchange's southeast quadrant were removed, being replaced by rebuilt ramps in the northeast quadrant which join 116 at a new signaled intersection with turn lanes. Then in 2019, the sharply curved ramps in the southwest and northwest quadrants were removed and the outer ramps in the same quadrants were reconfigured to provide full access to and from Route 116 and Route 246. And again, the signals with turn lanes were added to accommodate the full access.
