= Route 152 (Rhode Island–Massachusetts) =

Highway in Rhode Island and Massachusetts

Route 152
- Route 152 highlighted in red

Route information
- Maintained by RIDOT and MassDOT
- Length: 15.3821 mi (24.7551 km) 0.5 miles (0.80 km) in Rhode Island; 14.8821 miles (23.9504 km) in Massachusetts

Major junctions
- South end: US 1A / Route 114 in East Providence, RI
- Route 123 / Route 118 in Attleboro, MA; Route 106 in Plainville, MA
- North end: US 1 in Plainville, MA

Location
- Country: United States
- State: Massachusetts
- Counties: Providence (RI), Bristol (MA), Norfolk (MA)

Highway system
- Massachusetts State Highway System; Interstate; US; State
| ← Route 151 | → Route 159 |
| ← Route 146A | RI | → Route 165 |

Route 152 is a state highway in the U.S. states of Rhode Island and Massachusetts. The highway begins at U.S. Route 1A (US 1A) and Route 114 in East Providence, Rhode Island. After crossing into Massachusetts, Route 152 runs 14.8821 miles (23.9504 km) through Seekonk, Attleboro, and North Attleboro to US 1 in Plainville.

== Route description ==
Route 152 begins at the Rhode Island state line in the town of Seekonk; the state line is just east of the Ten Mile River, which is impounded as Central Pond to the north and James V. Turner Reservoir to the south. Newman Avenue continues west into East Providence as Rhode Island Route 152, which has its terminus at US 1A and Rhode Island Route 114 (Pawtucket Street). Route 152 crosses the East Junction Branch of the Providence and Worcester Railroad before meeting the eastern end of Brook Street; Brook Street is unsigned Route 15, which becomes Rhode Island Route 15 west of the state line in Pawtucket. The highway intersects Central Avenue within the community of North Seekonk and assumes that name before paralleling the Ten Mile River into Attleboro, where the highway follows the city's Main Street. Just north of the city line, Route 152 crosses over Amtrak's Northeast Corridor and passes to the east of the Hebronville Mill Historic District.

Route 152 crosses over the railroad again south of downtown and passes under the railroad next to the Attleboro station on the Massachusetts Bay Transit Authority's Providence/Stoughton Line in downtown Attleboro. In the center of town, the highway intersects Route 123, which heads southwest as County Street and east as Park Street to its junction with Route 118. Route 152 leaves the downtown area by crossing the Bungay River, at which the highway passes the historic Blackinton Houses and Park. Just south of the boundary between Attleboro and North Attleboro, the highway intersects Robert Toner Boulevard, which has an interchange with Interstate 95 (I-95) immediately to the west. Route 152 is named Kelley Boulevard as it passes through the town of North Attleboro, where the highway crosses over I-95. The highway intersects Route 106 (Messenger Street) just after crossing the Bristol–Norfolk county line and entering the town of Plainville. Route 152 follows Taunton Street north to its terminus at an oblique intersection with US 1 (Washington Street) just south of the U.S. Highway's interchange with I-495. Taunton Avenue continues north as a municipal highway toward Wrentham.

== History ==
Since the completion of the nearby Henderson Bridge and Expressway in East Providence in 1969 (and continuing past the replacement of the bridge and downgrade of the expressway in 2023-2024), eastbound signage near and at the eastern end of the expressway at Broadway referred to Broadway as being part of Route 152.

RI 152 has its southern terminus to the northwest of this interchange at Route 114 and US 1A; more recently, RIDOT officials have reported not knowing why these signs refer to RI 152 as extending down Broadway and cannot find any surviving records discussing a potential extension of RI 152 down Broadway past the Henderson Expressway towards Taunton Avenue and Waterman Avenue (US 44), I-195/US 6/US 1A, and RI 103. However, they believe there could have been a proposal for (what local roadgeek and historian Steve Anderson refers to as) "part of a larger plan to provide a marked parallel route for US 1A / RI 114 south to I-195 and Veterans [Memorial] Parkway." In their correspondence with Anderson, RIDOT referred to the 1969 signs referring to a RI 152 extension as "relics of mid-20th century highway planning processes." For this reason, Google Maps incorrectly refers to RI 152 as extending down Newman Avenue and Broadway to end south of the Henderson Expressway at U.S. Route 44.

== Major intersections ==
| County | Location | mi | km | Destinations | Notes |
|---|---|---|---|---|---|
| Providence | East Providence | 0.00 | 0.00 | US 1A / Route 114 (Pawtucket Avenue) / Newman Avenue west – Pawtucket, Barrington | Southern terminus |
| | | 0.50 0.0000 | 0.80 0.0000 | Rhode Island–Massachusetts state line | |
| Bristol | Seekonk | 2.4053 | 3.8710 | Route 15 west (Brook Street) / Route 15 – Pawtucket, RI | Massachusetts Route 15 is unsigned |
| Bristol | Attleboro | 8.5319 | 13.7308 | Route 123 to Route 118 – Norton, Brockton | |
| Bristol | Attleboro | 10.4211 | 16.7711 | Toner Boulevard west to I-95 – Boston, Pawtucket, RI, Providence, RI, North Attleboro | To Exit 7 of I-95 |
| Norfolk | Plainville | 13.5664 | 21.8330 | Route 106 – Mansfield, Easton, Plainville | |
| Norfolk | Plainville | 14.8821 | 23.9504 | US 1 to I-495 / Taunton Street – Norwood, Boston, Providence, RI | Northern terminus; Taunton Street continues north to Route 1A and Route 140 in Wrentham |
1.000 mi = 1.609 km; 1.000 km = 0.621 mi
