= Louisquisset =

Village in Rhode Island, U.S.

Coordinates: 41.8719°N 71.4479°W

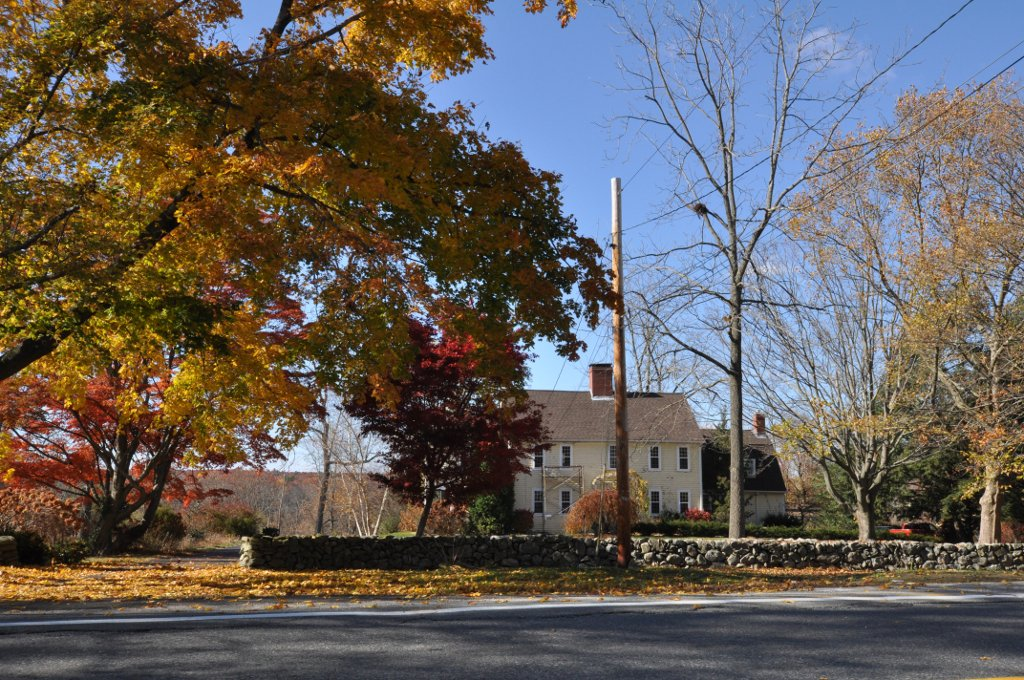
Jenckes House on Old Louisquisset Pike

Louisquisset (known previously as Louisquissuck and Loquassuck and Loquasquocit) is a village in Lincoln, Rhode Island, and North Providence, Rhode Island. The area was first settled in the 1660s when the colonial Providence government granted land to John Whipple and other settlers to acquire land title from the Native Americans in the area. In 1682 Old Louisquisset Pike was laid out to serve the main road through the area connecting Providence to Limerock and the old road continues to serve travellers as modern day Rhode Island Route 146 and Rhode Island Route 246. Louisquisset Country Club and other businesses in the area continue to use the Louisquisset name. Many historic buildings are preserved in the region, including: the seventeenth century Jenckes House on Old Louisquisset Pike.
