= Jacobs Pond (Norwell, Massachusetts) =

Pond in the United States

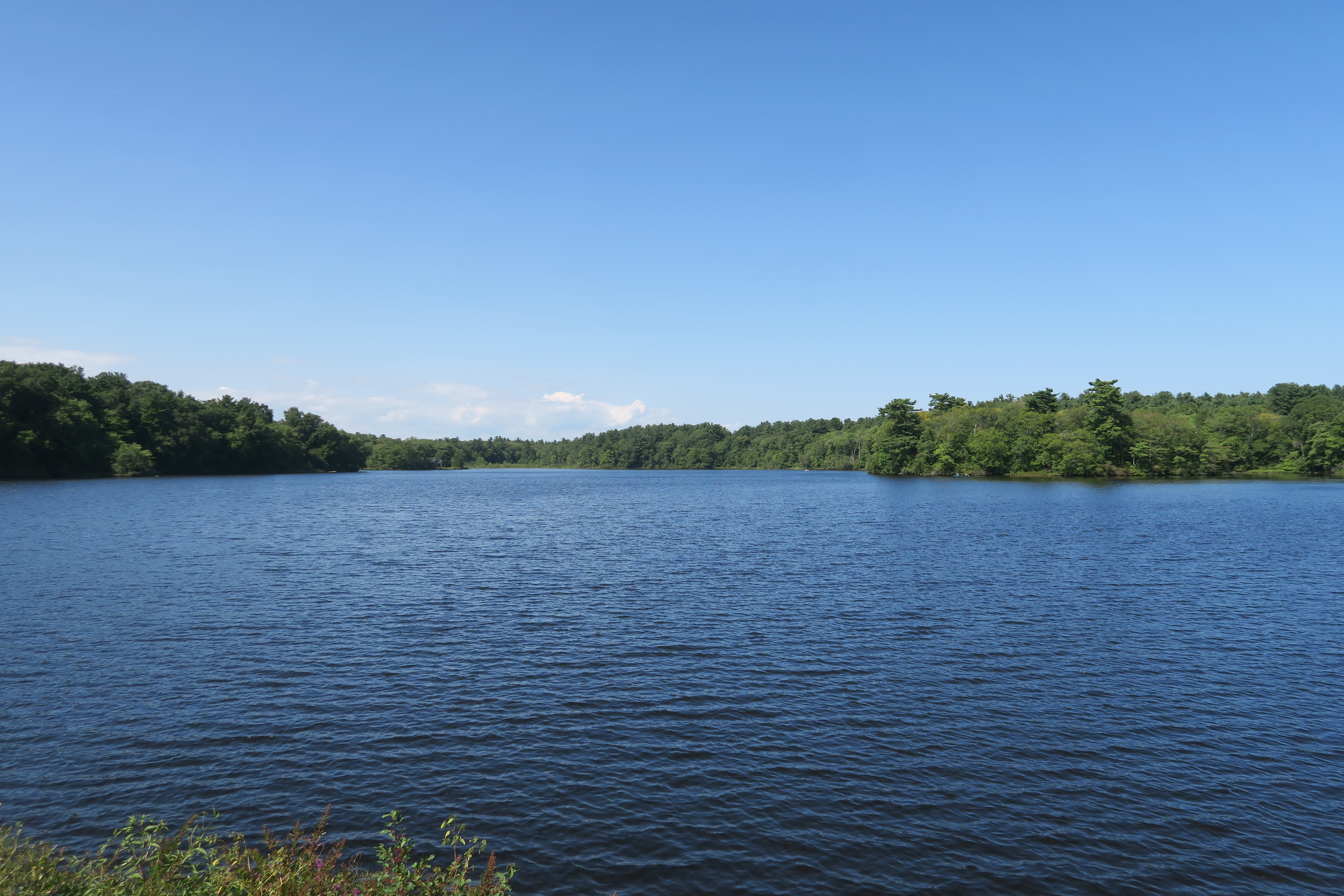
- Jacobs Pond

- Location within Massachusetts Location within the United States
- Location: Norwell, Massachusetts
- Coordinates: 42°09′43″N 70°50′57″W
- Primary outflows: Third Herring Brook
- Basin countries: United States
- Surface area: 59 acres (24 ha)
- Settlements: Assinippi

Jacobs Pond is a 59-acre (240,000 m^{2}) pond in Norwell, Massachusetts. The pond is located alongside Assinippi, a village in neighboring Hanover. Route 123 runs along the southern shore of the pond. The pond is the headwaters of Third Herring Brook, a tributary of the North River which is the town line between Norwell and the eastern boundary of Hanover. The water quality is impaired due to non-native aquatic plants and non-native fish in the pond. The South Shore Natural Science Center is located near this pond. The infamous "Jacobs Monster" is also rumored to lurk beneath the depths of the water.
