= Rhode Island Route 246 =

State highway in Rhode Island, US

Route 246
- Route 246 highlighted in red

Route information
- Maintained by RIDOT
- Length: 8 mi (13 km)

Major junctions
- South end: US 1 / US 44 in Providence
- I-95 in Providence; Route 146 in Providence and North Providence
- North end: Route 116 in Lincoln

Location
- Country: United States
- State: Rhode Island

Highway system
- Rhode Island Routes
← Route 238	→ I-295

Route 246 is a numbered state highway running 8 miles (13 km) in the U.S. state of Rhode Island. The Old Louisquisset Pike portion of the road was laid out through Louisquisset in 1682.

== Route description ==
Route 246 begins at an intersection with US 1 And US 44 in Providence, heading north on four-lane undivided Mill Street.From the southern terminus, the road crosses the Moshassuck River, where the name changes to Charles Street, and passes office buildings, intersecting the southern terminus of Route 7. The route turns northwest and splits into the one-way pair of Charles Street northbound and Ashburton Street and Chalkstone Avenue southbound. southbound as the northbound direction comes to a partial interchange with I-95 that provides access to northbound I-95 and from southbound I-95. Route 246 becomes two-way on Charles Street again and continues through commercial areas, coming to a bridge over Amtrak's Northeast Corridor. The route turns north, with a ramp to the northbound direction of the Route 146 freeway to the west, and narrows into a two-lane road that passes through urban residential neighborhoods.

The road enters North Providence, where it crosses Route 15. Route 246 passes more homes and businesses, curving to the northwest. The route interchanges with the Route 146 freeway in a wooded area with only entrance ramps to Route 146. Past this interchange, the road turns north again and enters Lincoln, where it becomes Old Louisquisset Pike. Route 246 runs through wooded areas with some homes a short distance to the west of Route 146. The route comes to a ramp from southbound Route 146 before it passes to the east of Twin River Casino. The road heads northwest through more woodland and residences, curving north and passing to the east of the Community College of Rhode Island Flanagan Campus before crossing Route 123. Route 246 continues northwest parallel to the Route 146 freeway, with a ramp providing access to and from the southbound lanes of Route 146. Farther northwest, the route ends at ramps at the interchange between Route 146 and Route 116, where there is access to and from the southbound lanes of Route 146.

== History ==
Route 246 is an old alignment of Route 146, which is now a freeway.

== Major intersections ==
The entire route is in Providence County.

Location	mi	km	Destinations	Notes
Providence	0.00	0.00	US 1 (North Main Street) / US 44	Southern terminus
Providence	0.06	0.097	Bridge over the Moshassuck River	
Providence	0.20	0.32	Route 7 north (Orms Street) to Route 146 south / I-95 south	Southern terminus of Route 7
Providence	0.40	0.64	I-95 north – Pawtucket, Boston	Northbound access only; exit 38 on I-95
Providence	0.80	1.29	Route 146 north	Access from Route 146 Southbound via Admiral St.
North Providence	2.70	4.35	Route 15 (Mineral Spring Avenue)	
North Providence	3.20	5.15	Route 146 – Providence, Worcester, MA	No access from Route 146
Lincoln	4.20	6.76	Route 146 south	Access from Route 146 only; no access to Route 146
Lincoln	5.40	8.69	Route 123 (Jenckes Hill Road) to Route 146	
Lincoln	6.80	10.94	Route 146 south	
Lincoln	7.80	12.55	Route 146 south – Providence	Interchange
Lincoln	8.00	12.87	Route 116 north to Route 146 / I-295 / Route 99 – Woonsocket, Worcester	Interchange, northern terminus
1.000 mi = 1.609 km; 1.000 km = 0.621 mi: Incomplete access
