= Rhode Island Route 114 =

State highway in Rhode Island, US

Route 114
- Route 114 highlighted in red

Route information
- Maintained by RIDOT
- Length: 45.7 mi (73.5 km)
- Existed: 1923–present

Major junctions
- South end: Route 138 in Middletown
- I-195 in East Providence; US 44 in East Providence; I-95 / US 1 in Pawtucket; I-295 in Cumberland
- North end: Route 122 in Woonsocket

Location
- Country: United States
- State: Rhode Island
- Counties: Newport, Bristol, Providence

Highway system
- Rhode Island Routes
← Route 113	→ Route 114A

Route 114 is a 45.7-mile-long (73.5 km) numbered state highway in the U.S. state of Rhode Island. It connects the city of Newport to the city of Woonsocket. Route 114 was a major north–south artery for its entire length until the arrival of the Interstate Highway System. It is still a major commercial corridor on Aquidneck Island and in northern Rhode Island (mainly Central Falls, Cumberland, and Woonsocket).

== Route description ==
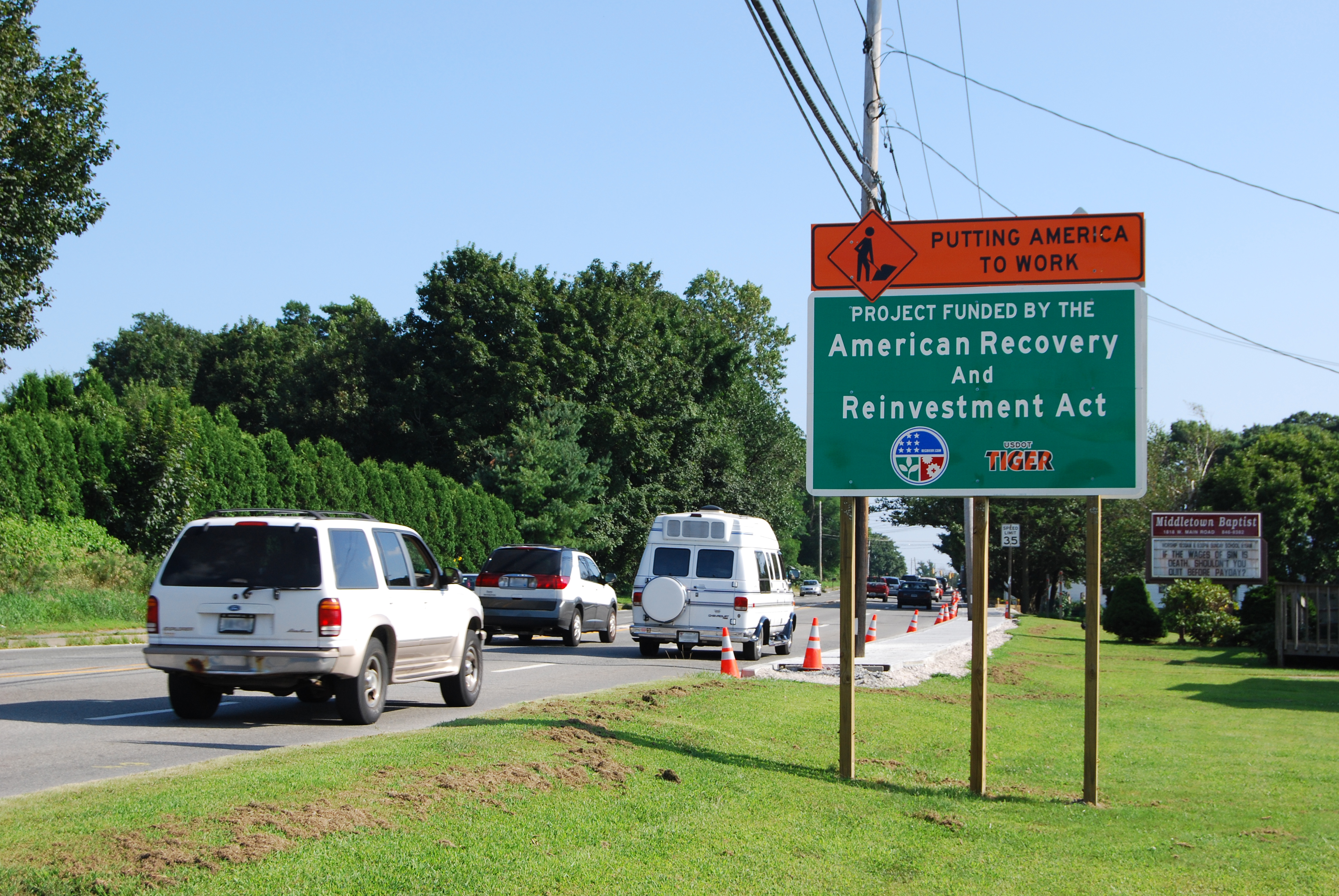
Sidewalk installation along RI 114 as a result of the American Recovery and Reinvestment Act of 2009

Route 114 begins at the Newport city line in the town of Middletown, at an intersection with Route 138 and Broadway. The resultant route 138 continues west into Newport as Admiral Kalbfus Way. Route 114 heads north on West Main Road in Middletown and Portsmouth. In Portsmouth the right lane becomes Route 24 as the left lane curves maintaining Route 114 in Portsmouth, Route 114 turns onto Bristol Ferry Road then crosses Mount Hope Bay into the town of Bristol along the Mount Hope Bridge. In Bristol, it continues north along Ferry Road then shifts to Hope Street. The route then enters the town of Warren, along Main Street through the town center, where it meets and conjoins Route 103. The concurrent route crosses the Palmer and Barrington rivers into the town of Barrington. Routes 114 and 103 continue together along County Road, with Route 114 soon splitting to the north using the Wampanoag Trail. Route 114 eventually reaches the city of East Providence, where the road curves west to meet Route 103 again at Pawtucket Avenue. Along the way, the East Shore Expressway begins at the Wampanoag Trail to connect to I-195. Pawtucket Avenue continues north through downtown East Providence, crossing over I-195, where it is joined by US 1A.

Routes 1A and 114 continue through the northern part of East Providence towards the city of Pawtucket, with US 1A later splitting off to the north as Route 114 heads northwest into the city of Pawtucket. In Pawtucket, Route 114 splits into a one-way couplet with the northbound direction using Prospect Street and the southbound direction using School Street. After running through several Pawtucket city streets, including an interchange with I-95, Route 114 crosses the Blackstone River and continues north along Broad Street into the city of Central Falls. (Note: To follow Route 114 northbound through Pawtucket, one must follow Prospect Street, continuing on School Street, then turning right onto Main Street, which merges into Wolcott Street. One then turns left onto Underwood Street, which becomes Cottage Street, then left onto Exchange Street, and left again onto Broadway. Follow Broadway south until it merges onto Main Street and crosses the Seekonk River. From there, turn right onto High Street and left onto Summer Street to merge onto Broad Street. To follow Route 114 southbound, one must turn left from Broad Street onto Exchange Street (Route 15) and cross the river using Exchange Street. From there, turn right onto Broadway, left onto Underwood Street, which curves right. At the end of the street, turn right onto Wolcott Street, left onto Summit Street, and right onto Division Street. Finally, turn left onto School Street. Note that the portion of the one-way Broadway between Exchange Street and Underwood Street carries both northbound and southbound directions of the route—a wrong way concurrency with itself. Though the routing seems odd by conventional thinking, it is well-defined in the 2001 edition of the Pavement Log kept by the Rhode Island Department of Transportation. As of July 2005 the signage in the vicinity is very spotty and offers no evidence to dispute the pavement log and, in some cases, the little signage that does exist actually seems to support it. On the other hand, Pawtucket's Department of Public Works has Route 114 northbound using Exchange Street, which is shorter and matches the southbound direction. (Pawtucket's log also shows the old northbound alignment—see above.)) After crossing the Blackstone River into the town of Cumberland, Route 114 shifts one block east to High Street as it heads towards the village of Valley Falls. (Note: In the 1990s or early 2000s, Route 114 was re-aligned in Cumberland, Rhode Island so that it now uses Blackstone Street to get between Broad Avenue and High Street. Before the re-alignment, Route 114 used to use Dexter Street (Route 123) for that purpose. Signage still exists as of July 2005 at the intersection of Dexter and High streets as evidence of this old alignment. However, a reassurance marker was installed northbound on the old alignment just past Route 123 in 2005. Drivers in either direction on Route 114 will go as described above, but the old alignment is still having signs installed.) The road continues north as Diamond Hill Road towards the rural areas of Cumberland, intersecting I-295 along the way. At the intersection with Route 121, Route 114 turns west along Pine Swamp Road towards the city of Woonsocket. In Woonsocket, Route 114 continues west as Diamond Hill Road, Privilege Street, and Winter Street, ending at Route 122. (Note: For many years, Route 114 used Social Street (Route 126) in Woonsocket to get between Diamond Hill Road and Privilege Street. New signage installed in 2003 by RIDOT now takes Route 114 one block further west so that it now uses Rathbun Street to make that jog rather than Social Street. However, no sign was installed on Route 114 southbound to turn left at Rathbun, and the old sign at Social (Route 126) has not been removed. Thus southbound traffic is still directed to turn left onto Social without a traffic signal, and the new sign for southbound traffic pointing right onto Diamond Hill from Social is not seen by Route 114 traffic.)

== History ==
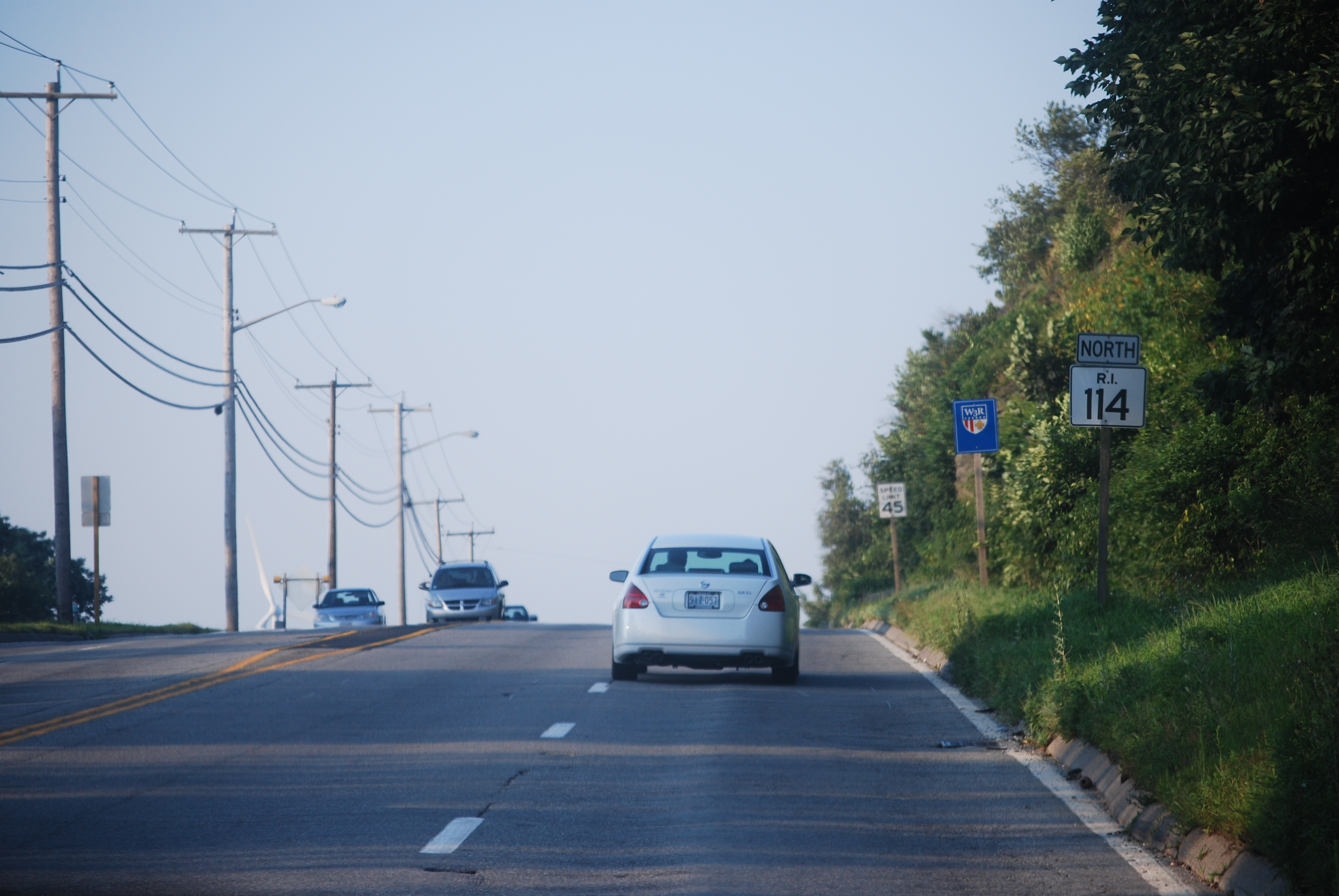
RI 114 in Portsmouth

Two sections of modern Route 114 were previously laid out as turnpikes in the early 19th century. In 1805, a charter was granted to the Rhode Island Turnpike corporation, which constructed a road from Portsmouth center to the Bristol Ferry at the north end of Aquidneck Island. The road is now Bristol Ferry Road (Route 114) and Turnpike Avenue. In 1813, the road from northern Pawtucket to the village of Valley Falls in Cumberland was also laid out as a turnpike, known as the Valley Falls Turnpike. The old road is what is now Broad Street in Pawtucket, Central Falls, and Cumberland.

Route 114 was an original Rhode Island route designated in 1923, running from Newport to Grants Mills in Cumberland. Until the 1960s, Route 114 ended at the intersection of Pine Swamp Road and Diamond Hill Road in Cumberland. Present-day Route 114 from that point west to Route 122 in Woonsocket, Rhode Island was given the Route 142 and later the Route 11 designation. When Route 11 became Route 121 in the 1960s, Route 121's terminus was cut back to the same intersection where Route 114 originally ended, and the route west to Woonsocket became Route 114.

In 2000, part of Route 114 northbound south of downtown Pawtucket was re-routed. The old alignment left Prospect Street at Pond Street, went east along Pond Street to Summit Street, north on Summit Street (this turn onto Summit is still signed as of July 2005) and re-joined Route 114 southbound at the corner of Summit Street and Division Street.

== Major intersections ==
County	Location	mi	km	Destinations	Notes
Newport	Middletown	0.00	0.00	Route 138 west (Admiral Kalbfus Road)	Continuation west; southern end of concurrency with Route 138
Newport	Middletown	0.8	1.3	Route 138 north (East Main Road)	Northern end of concurrency with Route 138
Newport	Middletown	1.3	2.1	Route 214 south (Valley Road)	Northern terminus of Route 214
Newport	Portsmouth	7.0	11.3	Route 24 north to I-195 – Fall River, Providence	Interchange; southern terminus of Route 24; northbound exit and southbound entrance
Newport	Portsmouth			Turnpike Avenue to Route 24 / Route 138	Exit 1 on Route 24
Newport	Portsmouth			Boyds Lane to Route 138; Bristol Ferry Road north	Partial interchange for Bristol Ferry Rd., at-grade intersection for Boyds Ln.
Mount Hope Bay		9.6– 10.1	15.4– 16.3	Mount Hope Bridge	
Bristol	Bristol	10.8	17.4	Route 136 north (Metacom Avenue) to I-195	Southern terminus of Route 136
Bristol	Warren	16.6	26.7	Route 103 east (Child Street)	Southern end of concurrency with Route 103
Bristol	Palmer River	32.2	51.8	Warren Bridge	
Bristol	Barrington	20.0	32.2	Route 103 west (County Road) – Riverside	Right in/right out interchange; northern end of concurrency with Route 103 east; southern end of concurrency with Route 103 west; southbound exit and entrance only
Bristol	Barrington			Route 103 west / Route 114 south – Riverside	U-turn interchange; northern end of concurrency with Route 103; northbound exit and southbound entrance
Providence	East Providence	22.4	36.0	Route 114A north to I-195 east / US 6	Southern terminus of Route 114A
Providence	East Providence	23.2	37.3	East Shore Expressway to I-195 west	Northbound left exit and southbound left entrance, exit 2B on I-195
Providence	East Providence	24.2	38.9	Route 103 east – Riverside	Southern end of concurrency with Route 103
Providence	East Providence	25.1– 25.2	40.4– 40.6	Route 103 west (Warren Avenue) to I-195 east I-195 west / US 1A south (US 6 west) to I-95	Northern end of concurrency with Route 103; southern end of concurrency with US 1A north; exit 2C on I-195
Providence	East Providence	25.9	41.7	US 44 (Taunton Avenue)	
Providence	East Providence	26.8	43.1	Route 114A south (Pleasant Street)	Northern terminus of Route 114A
Providence	East Providence	27.3	43.9	Route 152 north (Newman Avenue)	Southern terminus of Route 152
Providence	East Providence	27.9	44.9	US 1A north (Newport Avenue)	Northern end of concurrency with US 1A
Providence	Pawtucket	30.2	48.6	I-95 / US 1	Exit 41B on northbound I-95; no access from southbound I-95
Providence	Pawtucket	30.3	48.8	Route 15 east to I-95	Southern end of concurrency with Route 15
Providence	Pawtucket	30.6	49.2	Route 15 west (Park Place)	Northern end of concurrency with Route 15
Providence	Blackstone River	32.2	51.8	Broad Street Bridge	
Providence	Cumberland	32.8	52.8	Route 123 west (John Street)	Southern end of concurrency with Route 123
Providence	Cumberland	33.1	53.3	Route 123 east (Dexter Street)	Northern end of concurrency with Route 123
Providence	Cumberland	35.6	57.3	Route 116 south (Angell Road)	Northern terminus of Route 116
Providence	Cumberland	35.9	57.8	I-295 – Attleboro MA, Warwick	Exit 22 on I-295
Providence	Cumberland	38.3	61.6	Route 120 (Nate Whipple Highway)	
Providence	Cumberland	40.0	64.4	Route 121 north (Wrentham Road)	Southern terminus of Route 121
Providence	Woonsocket	44.3	71.3	Route 126 north (Social Street north)	Eastern end of concurrency with Route 126
Providence	Woonsocket	44.4	71.5	Route 126 south (Social Street south)	Western end of concurrency with Route 126
Providence	Woonsocket	45.7	73.5	Route 122 (Harris Avenue)	Northern terminus
1.000 mi = 1.609 km; 1.000 km = 0.621 mi: Concurrency terminus; Incomplete access

== East Shore Expressway ==
The East Shore Expressway is a 1.8-mile (2.9 km) spur of Route 114 in East Providence. It provides quick access between Route 114 south and I-195 west. The expressway, as it exists today, was completed on December 15, 1959, after two years of construction. Originally, the expressway was to have extended further south towards the Mount Hope Bridge over Mount Hope Bay, but those plans were cancelled sometime after 1959.

=== Exit list ===
The entire route is in East Providence, Providence County. All exits are unnumbered.

mi	km	Destinations	Notes
0.00	0.00	Route 114 south – Barrington	Continuation beyond southern terminus of E. Shore Expwy.; southern terminus of RI 114/E. Shore Expwy. overlap
0.4	0.64	Route 114 north / Pawtucket Avenue (Route 103)	Southbound exit and northbound entrance; northern terminus of RI 114/E. Shore Expwy. overlap
1.5– 1.8	2.4– 2.9	I-195 west / US 6 west	Northern terminus of E. Shore Expwy.; I-195 exit 2B
1.000 mi = 1.609 km; 1.000 km = 0.621 mi: Incomplete access
