= Massachusetts Route 123 =

State highway in southeastern Massachusetts, US

Route 123
- Route 123 highlighted in red

Route information
- Maintained by MassDOT
- Length: 41.91 mi (67.45 km)

Major junctions
- West end: Route 123 at the Rhode Island state line in South Attleboro
- US 1 in Attleboro; I-95 in Attleboro; Route 140 in Norton; I-495 in Norton; Route 24 in Brockton; Route 18 in Abington
- East end: Route 3A in Scituate

Location
- Country: United States
- State: Massachusetts
- Counties: Bristol, Plymouth

Highway system
- Massachusetts State Highway System; Interstate; US; State
← Route 122A	→ Route 124

Route 123 is a 41.91-mile-long (67.45 km) east–west (though geographically more northeast-southwest) state highway in southeastern Massachusetts. It crosses northern Bristol and Plymouth counties, crossing several highways along the way.

== Route description ==
=== Bristol County ===
Route 123 is a continuation of R.I. Route 123, which crosses the state line between Cumberland, Rhode Island and Attleboro. In the South Attleboro section of the city, it crosses Routes 1 and 1A in quick succession, just south of the junction of the two and the start of the Attleboro-North Attleborough retail area. It continues eastward, crossing I-95 at exit 4 (formerly 3) before turning northeastward, passing Capron Park and the former Attleboro High School building (now a branch of Bristol Community College) before reaching downtown Attleboro. It crosses Route 152 and under the MBTA commuter rail tracks before making another northerly turn, this time at the end of Route 118.

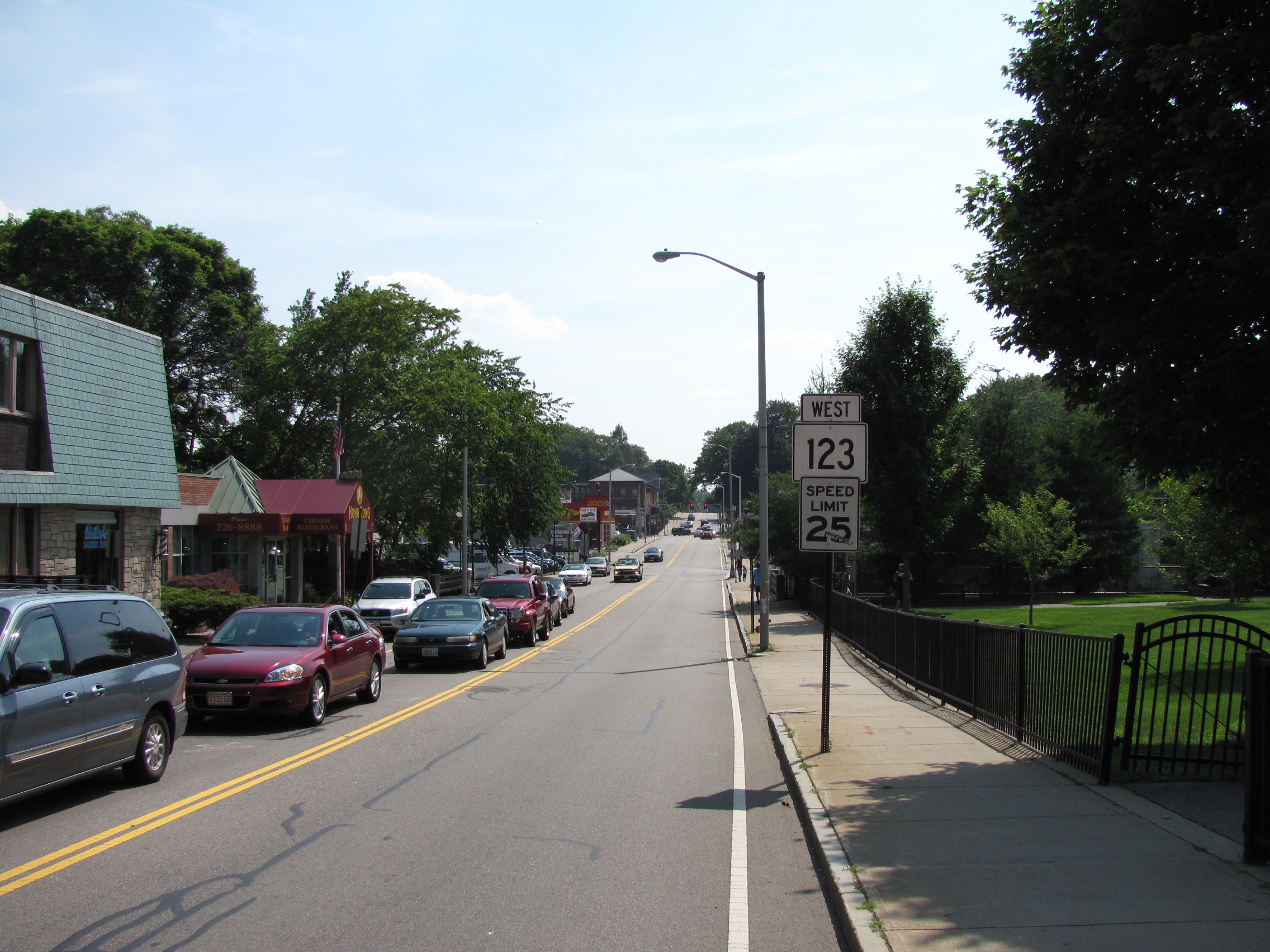
Westbound in Attleboro

From Attleboro, the route heads eastward into Norton. It crosses Route 140 at the town center, having a brief, 50-yard concurrency between the two. After passing Wheaton College, it continues through town, crossing I-495 at exit 27 (formerly 10). The road then turns northward into Easton. In Easton, the road turns eastward again as it becomes concurrent with Route 106 for just over a mile, with Route 123 turning northeastward at the Five Corners intersection between the two routes and Bay Road. The route eventually meets Route 138, which it shares a short concurrency with before turning eastward again at Stonehill College.

=== Plymouth County ===
In Brockton, Route 123 crosses Route 24 at exit 31 (formerly 17). The route passes the Brockton VA Medical Center, Campanelli Stadium, Brockton High School and the Brockton Fairgrounds in quick succession. At the intersection of Belmont Street and Warren Avenue, the eastbound and westbound lanes split. Eastbound, Route 123 makes a quick turn on and then off of Main Street and crosses Route 28 (North Montello Street) and under the Middleborough Main Line tracks before turning left and sharing a short, one-block long concurrency between Route 123 East and Route 27, before meeting the westbound lanes at the intersection of Commercial Street and Centre Street. The westbound lanes, meanwhile only intersect Routes 27 and 28, heading straight from Centre Street, across Main Street and along the short Legion Parkway before turning south onto Warren Avenue to meet up with the main route once more. Signage in the area is poor, however; many maps point to Route 123 being concurrent along Route 28 rather than following Commercial Street on the other side of the tracks.

Once the two lanes reconnect, they continue eastward along Centre Street, passing the Brockton Hospital before crossing the Beaver Brook into Abington. In Abington, Route 123 crosses Route 18 near the town center before making a quick turn along Washington street and turning eastward again, crossing the Plymouth Branch tracks adjacent to Abington station and Route 58 before heading into Rockland. In Rockland, the route shares a half-mile concurrency with Route 139 before turning northward, then eastward into the town of Hanover. In Hanover, the route crosses through the northern part of town, crossing Route 3 without junction before meeting Route 53 at the village of Assinippi, which provides access between Route 3 and Route 123 at exit 32 (formerly 13).

Shortly after the intersection, and just south of Jacobs Pond, the route enters Norwell as Main Street, traveling through the town's Historic District and village center. Route 123 finally ends after three-quarters of a mile in the neighboring town of Scituate, at a rotary intersection with Route 3A.

== Major intersections ==
County	Location	mi	km	Destinations	Notes
Bristol	Attleboro	0.00	0.00	Route 123 west – Valley Falls, Lincoln	Continuation into Rhode Island
Bristol	Attleboro	1.2	1.9	US 1 – Pawtucket, RI, North Attleboro, Wrentham	Route 123 provides access between Route 1 north and Route 1A south
Bristol	Attleboro	1.3	2.1	Route 1A – Pawtucket, RI, Providence, RI	
Bristol	Attleboro	3.5	5.6	I-95 – Providence, RI, Foxboro, Boston	Exits 4A-B on I-95
Bristol	Attleboro	5.6	9.0	Route 152 – Plainville, Boston	
Bristol	Attleboro	5.8	9.3	Route 118 south – Rehoboth	Northern terminus of Route 118
Bristol	Norton	11.3	18.2	Route 140 – Taunton, New Bedford, Mansfield, Foxboro	Brief, 50 yards (46 m) concurrency between the two routes
Bristol	Norton	13.1	21.1	I-495 – Taunton, Cape Cod, Mansfield, Marlboro	Exit 27 on I-495
Bristol	Easton	16.2	26.1	Route 106 west – Mansfield	Western end of Route 106 concurrency
Bristol	Easton	17.4	28.0	Route 106 east – West Bridgewater	Eastern end of Route 106 concurrency at Five Corners intersection
Bristol	Easton	20.1	32.3	Route 138 south – Taunton	Southern end of Route 138 concurrency
Bristol	Easton	20.3	32.7	Route 138 north – Stoughton	Northern end of Route 138 concurrency
Plymouth	Brockton	21.7	34.9	Route 24 – Fall River, Taunton, Randolph, Boston	Exits 31A-B on Route 24
Plymouth	Brockton	24.2	38.9	Warren Avenue	Western end of one-way pair
Plymouth	Brockton	24.5	39.4	Route 28 Route 27 north	Western end of Route 27 concurrency (eastbound); eastbound junction with Route 28
Plymouth	Brockton	24.6	39.6	Route 27 south – Whitman, Kingston	Eastern end of Route 27 concurrency (eastbound); wrong-way concurrency with Route 27 west begins at next block
Plymouth	Brockton	24.8	39.9	Route 27 north	Eastern end of wrong-way concurrency with Route 27; eastern end of one-way pair
Plymouth	Abington	28.7	46.2	Route 18 – Whitman, New Bedford, Weymouth	
Plymouth	Abington	29.7	47.8	Route 58 – North Abington, Weymouth, Hanson, Wareham	
Plymouth	Rockland	31.0	49.9	Route 139 west – North Abington, Randolph	Western end of Route 139 concurrency
Plymouth	Rockland	31.6	50.9	Route 139 east – Marshfield, Hanover	Eastern end of Route 139 concurrency
Plymouth	Hanover	35.7	57.5	Route 53 – Hanover, Weymouth	To Route 3 via Route 53 south
Plymouth	Scituate	41.91	67.45	Route 3A – Marshfield, Kingston, Cohasset, Boston	Eastern terminus; rotary
1.000 mi = 1.609 km; 1.000 km = 0.621 mi: Concurrency terminus
