= Rhode Island Route 146 =

State highway in Providence County, Rhode Island, US

Route 146
- Route 146 highlighted in red, Route 146A in blue

Route information
- Maintained by RIDOT
- Length: 16.24 mi (26.14 km)

Major junctions
- South end: I-95 / US 6 / US 44 / Route 10 / US 1 / Route 7 in Providence
- Route 15 in North Providence; Route 116 in Lincoln; I-295 in Lincoln; Route 99 in Lincoln; Route 146A in North Smithfield
- North end: Route 146 at the Massachusetts state line

Location
- Country: United States
- State: Rhode Island
- Counties: Providence

Highway system
- Rhode Island Routes
← Route 142	→ Route 152

Route 146 is a 16.24-mile (26.14 km) state highway in the U.S. state of Rhode Island, maintained by the Rhode Island Department of Transportation (RIDOT). Running along a northwest–southeast axis, it links the cities of Providence, Woonsocket, and Worcester, Massachusetts.

The southern terminus of Route 146 is located at Interstate 95 (I-95) in Providence. The entire route is now a freeway as of 2026. The northern terminus is located at the Rhode Island–Massachusetts state line in Millville, where it transitions into Massachusetts Route 146 and continues northbound towards the Massachusetts Turnpike in Millbury and I-290 in Worcester.

== Route description ==
Route 146 begins in downtown Providence at I-95 northbound exit 38 (there is no direct access from I-95 southbound; access to Route 146 is via surface streets). Locally it is known as Old Louisquisset Pike, and is a narrow four-lane freeway with no shoulders and a simple Jersey barrier median separating oncoming traffic. The first two interchanges are partial access only, with Route 7 (Douglas Avenue) and Route 246 (Charles Street) and provide access between Route 146 and I-95 via surface streets for where there is no direct access (southbound I-95 to northbound Route 146, and southbound Route 146 to northbound I-95). The first complete interchange is a diamond interchange with Branch Avenue, followed by a partial interchange with Route 15 (no northbound entrance to Route 146). The next interchange, with Route 246 a second time, provides the access missing from the Route 15 interchange.

At this point, now in North Providence the "Old Louisquisset Pike" designation leaves to follow Route 246, and the Route 146 freeway becomes the Eddie Dowling Highway. Near the southern boundary of Lincoln, there is a southbound-only offramp (no other access) with Route 246, while the northbound side abuts Olney Pond in the Lincoln Woods State Park. Two partial cloverleaf interchanges follow with Twin River Road and Route 123/Breakneck Hill Road. The next interchange northbound is a right-in/right-out terminus of Sherman Avenue, while southbound has access to Route 246 here. A single onramp provides Wilbur Road an entrance to northbound Route 146 next, then an interchange with Route 116, followed shortly by a full cloverleaf interchange with I-295 and the southern terminus of Route 99, which is a short connector freeway to the city of Woonsocket. Route 99 access is a northbound exit/southbound entrance only, the other directions need to use Sayles Hill Road for access.

Route 146 continues through the southern part of the town of North Smithfield, Rhode Island. A major renovation project was completed in 2026 that removed a former at-grade intersection at Sayles Hill Road (featuring the lone traffic light on the stretch). As a result of the renovation, Route 146 is now a continuous highway complete with a flyover bridge over Sayles Hill Road. Access to Sayles Hill Road and the businesses on Route 146 are now accessible via new frontage roads in both directions. The frontage roads on both sides are unnumbered exits.

At a reconstructed interchange with Route 146A (which provides full access in both directions effective in 2026) the freeway resumes, now called the North Smithfield Expressway, which has three interchanges in the town: Route 104, Pound Hill Road, and a complex interchange with School Street and Route 146A that also provides access to Route 5 and Route 102. Approximately two miles (3.2 km) north of this interchange, the freeway continues into Massachusetts as Massachusetts Route 146, the Worcester–Providence Pike.

== History ==
Prior to the construction of the two freeway sections, Route 146 used present-day Route 246 and Route 146A. The only part of the original alignment still in use is the section between I-295/Route 99 and Route 146A in the southern part of North Smithfield.

In May 2019, Route 146 received mile-based exit numbers. Previously, the exits were unnumbered.

RIDOT erected two toll gantries in 2019, one in Lincoln and one in North Smithfield, for truck-only electronic toll collection. Those gantries have been shut off since September 2022.

In May 2019, the Rhode Island Senate announced that the state would borrow $200 million to reconfigure I-95 through Downtown Providence, near the southern terminus of Route 146. The replacement of the Providence Viaduct with twin bridges alleviated the bottleneck created by traffic entering I-95 from US Route 6 (US 6) and Route 10, and exiting towards Route 146 and US 44. The project cost $250 million. This project was completed in 2025.

In 2022, RIDOT began work on an overpass at Sayles Hill Road, which featured the only set of traffic signals along the route in Rhode Island. The intersection was notorious for car accidents and was deemed unsafe. The project also included constructing frontage roads and bus bays, and rebuilding the interchange with Route 146A at North Smithfield. Work was completed in 2026.

== Major intersections ==
The entire route is in Providence County.

Location	mi	km	Exit	Destinations	Notes
Providence	0.00	0.00	–	I-95 south to I-195 east / US 6 / Route 10 south / US 44 / US 1 / Route 7 – Downtown Providence	Southern terminus; exit 37A-B-C on I-95 the New Service Road To I-95 Northbound
Providence	0.30	0.48	1A	Route 246 (Charles Street) / Admiral Street – State Offices	Southbound exit and northbound entrance
Providence	1.40	2.25	1B	Branch Avenue	Signed as exit 1 northbound
North Providence	2.50	4.02	2	Route 15 (Mineral Spring Avenue) – North Providence, Pawtucket	No northbound entrance
Lincoln	4.00	6.44	4A	Route 246 (Old Louisquisset Pike)	Southbound exit only
Lincoln	4.50	7.24	4B	Twin River Road	Signed as exit 4 northbound
Lincoln	5.00	8.05	5	Route 123 (Breakneck Hill Road)	
Lincoln	6.40	10.30	6	Route 246 (Old Louisquisset Pike) / Sherman Avenue	Signed for Route 246 southbound, Sherman Avenue northbound
Lincoln	7.40	11.91	7	Route 116 – Lincoln, Smithfield	Southbound exit 7 provides access to Route 246 via collector–distributor lanes shared with exits 8A-B
Lincoln	8.50	13.68	8A-B	I-295 – Boston, MA, Warwick	Signed as exits 8A (north) and 8B (south); exits 18A-B on I-295
Lincoln	8.80	14.16	8C	Route 99 north to Route 122 – Woonsocket, Cumberland	Northbound exit and southbound entrance; accessed from the collector–distributor lanes shared with exits 8A-B
Lincoln	9.00	14.48	9	Reservoir Road	Southbound exit and entrance; right-in, right-out
Lincoln	9.70	15.61	—	To Route 99 (Sayles Hill Road)	Access via frontage roads in both directions. Frontage roads are unnumbered.
North Smithfield	10.50	16.90			
North Smithfield	10.50	16.90	—	Sayles Hill Road	Southbound exit and entrance; access via exit 10
North Smithfield	10.60	17.06	10	Route 146A north – North Smithfield, Woonsocket	Southern terminus of Route 146A
North Smithfield	12.10	19.47	11	Route 104 – North Smithfield, Woonsocket	
North Smithfield	13.40	21.57	13	Pound Hill Road – North Smithfield	Access to Industrial Drive and CVS Distribution Center
North Smithfield	14.30	23.01	14	Route 146A – North Smithfield, Burrillville	
North Smithfield	16.24	26.14	–	Route 146 north – Worcester	Continuation into Massachusetts
1.000 mi = 1.609 km; 1.000 km = 0.621 mi: Incomplete access

== Route 146A ==
Route 146A
- Location: North Smithfield–Woonsocket-Burrillville
- Length: 5.9 mi (9.5 km)

Route 146A is a numbered state highway running 5.9 miles (9.5 km) in Rhode Island. It was designated as Route 146 before the construction of the North Smithfield Expressway. The road follows a former stagecoach path through historic Union Village in North Smithfield. This road was known as "the Great Road". The northern end of the road crosses the state line near Buxton Street at Uxbridge, Massachusetts. This section was known as Ironstone, after good quality bog iron ore found near here.

It runs for 5.9 miles (9.5 km) through North Smithfield on Route 146 to Massachusetts state line at Route 146A using Eddie Dowling Highway, Smithfield Road, Great Road, Victory Highway, North Main Street and Quaker Highway.

Major intersections
The entire route is in Providence County.

Location	mi	km	Destinations	Notes
North Smithfield	0.0	0.0	Route 146 to I-295 / Route 116 – Providence, Worcester, MA	Southern terminus; exit 10 on Route 146
Woonsocket	1.6	2.6	Route 104 (Greenville Road)	
North Smithfield	3.9	6.3	Route 146 – Providence, Worcester, MA	Exit 14 on Route 146
Burrillville	5.2	8.4	Route 5 south (Victory Highway) / Route 102 south (North Main Street)	Southern terminus of concurrency with Route 5; northern terminus of Route 102
Burrillville	5.3	8.5	Route 5 north (Central Street)	Northern terminus of concurrency with Route 5
Burrillville	5.9	9.5	Route 146A north – Uxbridge	Continuation into Massachusetts
1.000 mi = 1.609 km; 1.000 km = 0.621 mi: Concurrency terminus
