= Interstate 295 (Rhode Island–Massachusetts) =

Interstate Highway in Rhode Island and Massachusetts

Interstate 295
- Providence Beltway
- I-295 highlighted in red

Route information
- Auxiliary route of I-95
- Maintained by RIDOT and MassDOT
- Length: 26.58 mi (42.78 km)
- Existed: 1969–present
- NHS: Entire route

Major junctions
- South end: I-95 in Warwick, RI
- US 6 / US 6A in Johnston, RI; US 44 in Smithfield, RI; Route 146 in Lincoln, RI; US 1 in North Attleborough, MA
- North end: I-95 in Attleboro, MA

Location
- Country: United States
- States: Rhode Island, Massachusetts
- Counties: RI: Kent, Providence; MA: Bristol

Highway system
- Interstate Highway System; Main; Auxiliary; Suffixed; Business; Future
- Rhode Island Routes
- Massachusetts State Highway System; Interstate; US; State
← Route 246	RI	→ Route 401
← I-291	MA	→ Route 295

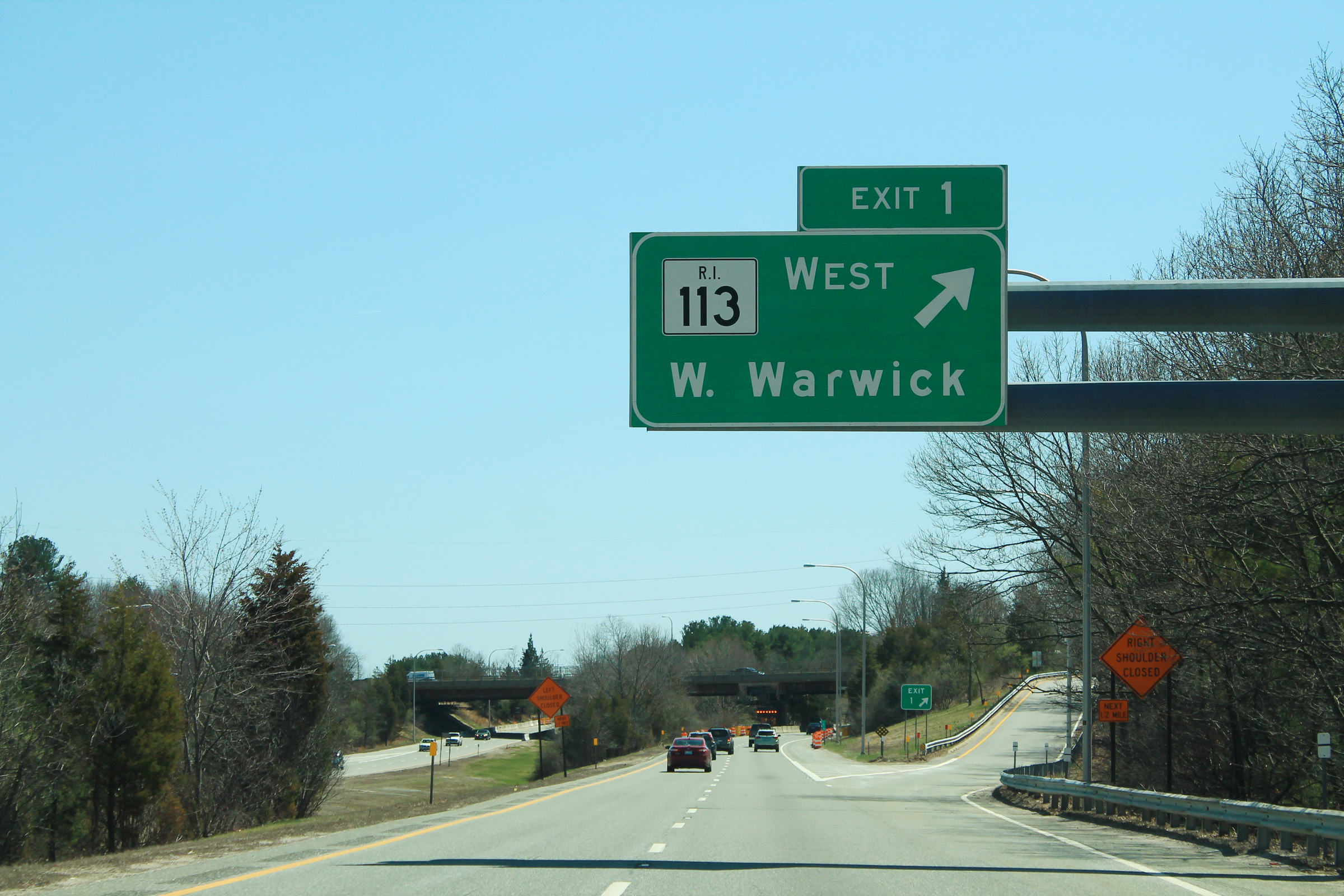
I-295 exit to Rhode Island Route 113 west, West Warwick, Rhode Island

Interstate 295 (I-295), sometimes called the Providence Beltway, is an auxiliary Interstate Highway in the US states of Rhode Island and Massachusetts. It is maintained by the Rhode Island Department of Transportation (RIDOT) and the Massachusetts Department of Transportation (MassDOT). Spanning nearly 27 miles (43 km), it forms a western beltway around Providence, Rhode Island, and is a bypass of I-95 as it travels through the capital city. I-895 was proposed as a complementary eastern beltway to complete a full loop around the city in the 1960s but was ultimately scrapped in the 1980s.

The southern terminus of I-295 is at its split from I-95 in Warwick, Rhode Island. Among several state highways, it intersects with US Route 6 (US 6) in Johnston, Rhode Island, and US 44 in Smithfield, Rhode Island, before entering North Attleborough, Massachusetts, from Cumberland, Rhode Island. It intersects with US 1 in North Attleborough before arriving at its northern terminus as it merges into I-95 in Attleboro. I-295 was the first highway in Rhode Island to convert to an exclusive mileage-based exit numbering system, having transitioned from a sequential numbering system in 2017. Exit signs north of the interchange with US 6 previously included both milemarkers and exit numbers before being replaced in 2007.

== Route description ==
Lengths
	mi	km
RI	22.35	35.97
MA	4.23	6.81
Total	26.58	42.78

=== Rhode Island ===
I-295 serves as a partial circumferential highway around Providence, bypassing the city to the west and north. The southern terminus of I-295 is located in Warwick (I-95 exit 28A). The complex interchange involves access between I-95, I-295, and Route 113, which is labeled exit 1A (the interchange with I-95 is unnumbered). Immediately after this interchange, I-295 crosses the Pawtuxet River and passes Warwick Mall, which lies on a property outlined by the interchange and the two highways. The mall is accessed via exit 1B, which provides partial access to Route 2 (northbound I-295 exits to northbound Route 2, while southbound I-295 exits to southbound Route 2). Exits 3A and 3B provide access to Route 37 within the city of Cranston. Exit 6 for Route 14 is next, known locally as Plainfield Pike, which defines the border between Cranston and Johnston. Exit 7 provides access to a local industrial park. There is a complex interchange with US 6 and US 6A in Johnston, labeled exits 9A, 9B, and 9C, which involves near overlap between US 6 and I-295 (US 6 uses the collector–distributor lanes along the side of I-295 briefly, and access from US 6 westbound to I-295 southbound requires the use of a special double-loop ramp at exit 9B). A diamond interchange (exit 10) with Route 5 is the last exit in Johnston, and the highway enters Smithfield and immediately has a cloverleaf interchange (exits 12A and 12B) with US 44. After another cloverleaf interchange (exits 15A and 15B) with Route 7, the highway begins a gentle curve eastward toward Massachusetts. Within the town of Lincoln, I-295 meets Route 146 (exits 18A and 18B). There are two interchanges in the town of Cumberland, being Route 122 (exit 20) and Route 114 (exit 22).

=== Massachusetts ===
Entering Massachusetts in the town of North Attleborough, there is a cloverleaf interchange (exits 2A and 2B) with US 1 before reaching its northern terminus (locally eastbound) in Attleboro at exits 4A and 4B with I-95.

== History ==
In the mid-1950s, the state of Rhode Island introduced plans to build a beltway around Providence, then known as Relocated Rhode Island Route 5 for inclusion in the Interstate Highway System. A modified version of this plan was accepted, with another modification done in 1960 resulting in a planned alignment. Construction began in 1964, and the original route was completed by 1975. The original intention was to have I-295 act as a full ring road around the Providence metropolitan area with the alignment roughly following Rhode Island Route 37 across Narragansett Bay and continuing in a northern direction with a major interchange located at I-195 exit 2 in Swansea, Massachusetts, before heading west toward Attleboro. Due to opposition from communities in the proposed alignment, cancelation occurred in 1982.

The original alignment of I-84 called for an east–west right-of-way from the Rhode Island and Connecticut state line (Willimantic, Connecticut, and Foster, Rhode Island) to Johnston, Rhode Island, through the Scituate Reservoir. The connection with I-295 was planned as a full interchange with flyover ramps. Due to fears of runoff affecting the Scituate Reservoir, this alignment of I-84 was canceled. This interchange (exits 9A, 9B, and 9C) currently acts as multiplex for US 6 with a partial interchange with Rhode Island Route 10 further down US 6. The ramp that was originally going to be used to merge onto I-84 west from I-295 north has been converted to a turnaround ramp (exit 9B) from I-295 north to I-295 South.

In 2016 Rhode Island passed the RhodeWorks Act which imposed tolls on tractor-trailers crossing 13 bridges in the state, including on I-295. High-speed toll gantries were installed at several locations along I-295 between 2018 and 2020. Toll rates at each point varied between $2.25 and $9.50, with a daily cap of $40 and a cap of $20 for trips between Connecticut and Massachusetts. In September 21, 2022 trial, a district court judge ruled that the tolls violated the interstate commerce clause and therefore must be halted. Rhode Island appealed to the United States Court of Appeals for the First Circuit who ruled in 2024 that tolling could resume, however the daily caps must be removed as they unfairly favored local trucking companies over out of state trucking companies. The state awarded a new tolling contract to Quarterhill in 2026 with an intent to resume truck tolls in 2027.

== Exit list ==
In 2016, it was announced that both Rhode Island and Massachusetts interchanges were to receive new exit numbers based on route mileage in accordance with federal standards. Massachusetts was scheduled to start in 2016, though the project was indefinitely postponed in mid-2016. On November 18, 2019, MassDOT confirmed the project will begin in late summer 2020. Massachusetts exits were renumbered over two nights on January 3–4, 2021. Rhode Island exits were renumbered from November 27, 2017, to December 8, 2017.

State	County	Location	mi	km	Exit	Destinations	Notes
Rhode Island	Kent	Warwick	0.00	0.00	–	I-95 south – New York	Southern terminus; exit 28 on I-95
Rhode Island	Kent	Warwick	0.70	1.13	1A	Route 113 west – West Warwick	No northbound entrance
Rhode Island	Kent	Warwick	1.10– 1.50	1.77– 2.41	1B	Route 2 – Cranston, Warwick, Warwick Mall	No northbound access to Route 2 south
Rhode Island	Providence	Cranston	3.70	5.95	3	Route 37 / Phenix Avenue – Cranston, T. F. Green Airport	Signed as exits 3A (Route 37 east) and 3B (Route 37 west); exits 1A and 1B on Route 37
Rhode Island	Providence	Cranston–Johnston line	6.50	10.46	6	Route 14 (Plainfield Pike)	
Rhode Island	Providence	Johnston	7.60	12.23	7	Rhode Island Resource Recovery Industrial Park	Opened in 2005
Rhode Island	Providence	Johnston	8.80	14.16	9	US 6 east – Providence	Southern end of US 6 concurrency; signed as exits 9A (US 6) and 9B (NB U-Turn to I-295 south)
Rhode Island	Providence	Johnston	9.50	15.29	9C	US 6 west / US 6A east – Hartford, CT	Northern end of US 6 concurrency; western terminus of US 6A
Rhode Island	Providence	Johnston	10.60	17.06	10	Route 5 – Johnston, Smithfield	Opened July 28, 2018
Rhode Island	Providence	Smithfield	12.20	19.63	12	US 44 – North Providence, Smithfield	Signed as exits 12A (US 44 east) and 12B (US 44 west)
Rhode Island	Providence	Smithfield	15.40	24.78	15	Route 7 – North Providence, North Smithfield	Signed as exits 15A (RI 7 south) and 15B (RI 7 north)
Rhode Island	Providence	Lincoln	18.70	30.09	18	Route 146 – Lincoln, Woonsocket	Signed as exits 18A (RI 146 south) and 18B (RI 146 north); exits 8A and 8B on Route 146, To Route 99 via 18B
Rhode Island	Providence	Cumberland	21.10	33.96	20	Route 122 – Cumberland	
Rhode Island	Providence	Cumberland	22.80	36.69	22	Route 114 – Cumberland	
			23.50 0.00	37.82 0.00	Rhode Island–Massachusetts state line		
Massachusetts	Bristol	North Attleborough	1.86	2.99	2	US 1 – Pawtucket, RI, North Attleboro	Signed as exits 2A (US 1 south) and 2B (US 1 north)
Massachusetts	Bristol	Attleboro	4.03	6.49	4	I-95 – Boston, Providence, RI	Northern terminus; signed as exits 4A (I-95 south) and 4B (I-95 north); exit 6 on I-95
1.000 mi = 1.609 km; 1.000 km = 0.621 mi: Incomplete access
