= Centerdale, Rhode Island =

Coordinates: 41°51′23″N 71°28′43″W

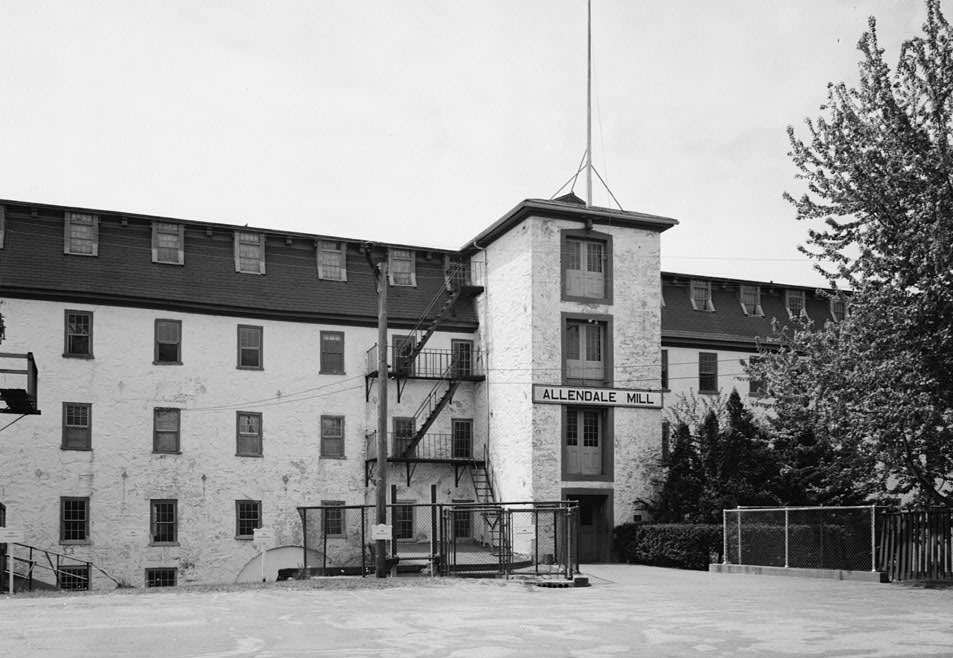
Allendale Mill (1822) is located in Centerdale

Centerdale (also known as Centredale) is an unincorporated place within the town of North Providence, Rhode Island. The historic Allendale Mill (1822) is located in Centerdale.
