= Rhode Island Department of Transportation =

Government agency in Rhode Island, United States

Rhode Island Department of Transportation (RIDOT)

Agency overview
- Formed: 1970; 56 years ago
- Jurisdiction: Rhode Island
- Headquarters: 2 Capitol Hill Providence, Rhode Island
- Employees: 790
- Annual budget: $139,578,656
- Agency executives: Peter Alviti, Jr. P.E., Director; Celia Blue, Chief of Staff; Loren Doyle, Chief Operating Officer; David Fish*, Chief Engineer; *acting
- Website: dot.ri.gov

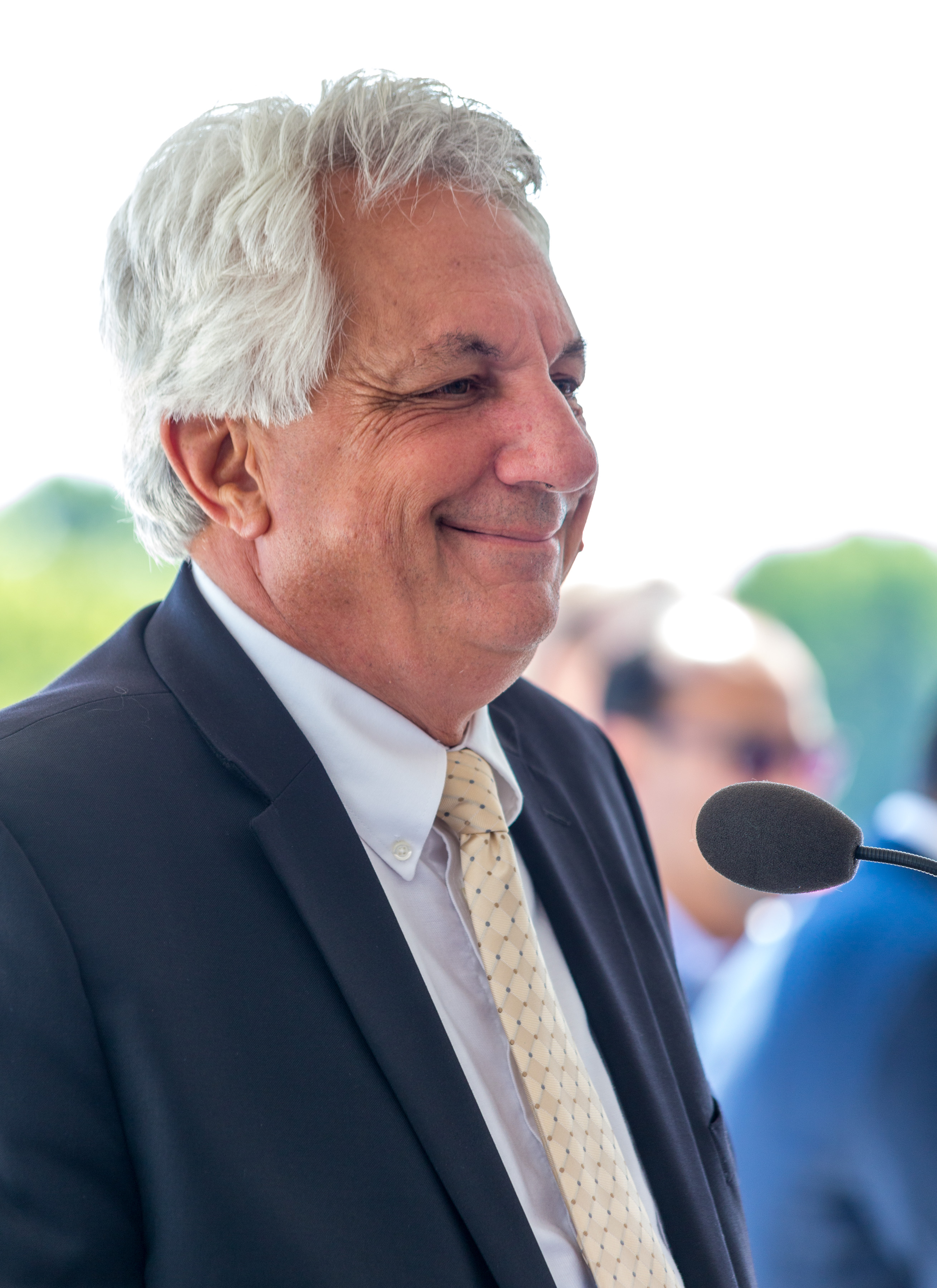
Peter Alviti, Jr.

The Rhode Island Department of Transportation (RIDOT) is a Rhode Island state government agency charged with design, construction, maintenance and inspection of a wide range of transportation infrastructure. These include 3,300 lane miles of state roads and highways, 1,162 bridges, 777 traffic signals, and six rail stations. Additionally, RIDOT has constructed a 50-mile (80 km) network of off-road bike paths and signed more than 90 miles (140 km) of on-road bike routes across the state. Its headquarters are located in Providence.

Rhode Island ports are handled by the R.I. Economic Development Corporation, airports in Rhode Island are overseen by the subsidiary R.I. Airport Corporation, and passenger train service is operated by Amtrak (a federal semi-public corporation) and the Massachusetts Bay Transportation Authority (a state agency of Massachusetts). Through the 1989 Pilgrim Partnership Agreement RIDOT financed construction of the Boston-bound MBTA commuter rail service into Providence and beyond (see Providence/Stoughton Line). Driver's licenses and motor vehicle registrations are the responsibility of the R.I. Division of Motor Vehicles, an office of the Rhode Island Department of Revenue. Two large bridges, the Claiborne Pell (Newport) Bridge and the Mount Hope Bridge, are under the responsibility of the R.I. Turnpike and Bridge Authority.

Presently, Rhode Island continues to face significant infrastructure challenges. As of 2025, the state maintains 787 total bridges, of which 110 are rated in poor condition. This figure ranks Rhode Island 5th worst in the nation by percentage of bridges in poor condition. While recent infrastructure investments have begun to lower these numbers, older reports by organizations such as Transportation 4 America have historically rated nearly 68 percent of Rhode Island's roads in poor or mediocre condition. Additionally, the Providence Viaduct on Interstate 95 and the Route 10-Route 6 junction have structural deficiencies and require significant rehabilitation.

== History ==
The State Board of Public Roads was created in 1902 to oversee construction, improvement, and maintenance of state-owned roadways. Prior to the creation of the Rhode Island State Board of Public Roads, the monitoring and maintenance of public roads was scattered and localized.

In 1909 an Automobile division was introduced with the responsibility of registering vehicles, issuing plates, and handling other aspects of vehicle administration. This division would become a precursor to the current Rhode Island Division of Motor Vehicles.

As part of the larger government restructuring into a departmental system in 1935, the Department of Public Works was created under PL 1935, chapter 2188. This department took over the responsibilities of the State Board of Public Roads, and included a division of roads and bridges, a division of public buildings, a division of state airports, and a division of harbors and rivers.

In 1970 the Rhode Island Department of Transportation was created by statutory authority in PL 1970, chapter 111 (RIGL §42-13-1) in order to bring together in one department all responsibilities relating to transportation. The newly formed Department of Transportation took over the functions of the Department of Public Works, the Registry of Motor Vehicles, the Rhode Island Turnpike and Bridge Authority, and the Council on Highway Safety.

== See also ==
- Numbered routes in Rhode Island
- Rhode Island Public Transit Authority
- Rhode Island Department of Revenue
- T. F. Green Airport
