= Interstate 895 (Rhode Island–Massachusetts) =

Former proposed Interstate Highway in Rhode Island and Massachusetts

Interstate 895
- Original proposed I-895 corridor highlighted in red, alternate corridor in blue

Route information
- Auxiliary route of I-95
- Existed: 1968–1982
- NHS: Entire route

Location
- Country: United States

Highway system
- Interstate Highway System; Main; Auxiliary; Suffixed; Business; Future
- Massachusetts State Highway System; Interstate; US; State
- Rhode Island Routes
← I-695	Mass.	→ US 1
← Route 403	RI	→ US 1

Interstate 895 was a proposed Interstate Highway in Rhode Island and Massachusetts that would have supplemented Interstate 295 to create a full beltway around Providence.

== History ==
In the mid-1950s, highway officials in Rhode Island, and the Rhode Island Department of Public Works (RIDPW; now the Rhode Island Department of Transportation, or RIDOT) proposed the East Shore Expressway to "bypass the existing two-lane RI 114 in East Providence, Barrington, Warren, and Bristol". The first (and only) portion to be completed was done as part of the construction of Interstate 195 in East Providence; this 1.8-mile piece of highway connected I-195 to RI 114 (Wampanoag Trail).

In 1966, officials in Rhode Island and Massachusetts undertook additional planning for a southern bypass of Providence, which would connect to I-295 at both ends and make a full beltway around Providence and Pawtucket. Interstate 895 was officially added to the Interstate System in 1968 and officially deleted in 1982. Throughout the planning process, there were two different routes proposed, the second of which was proposed only after the first route met with considerable opposition from residents in Warwick, Barrington, and Warren.

=== Original route ===
The original route for Interstate 895 was the shorter of the two routes and would have stayed completely within the Providence metro area.

Interstate 895's southern terminus would have been at the present-day Route 37/Interstate 295 interchange in Cranston. From that point, it would have used the current RI 37 freeway, which was completed in 1965, and which would have been extended past its current eastern terminus with U.S. Route 1, through Cranston and Warwick to Conimicut Point where it would have used a new bridge over Narragansett Bay to reach Barrington. The Highway would have proceeded east through Barrington along Nayatt Road then turned northeast in the vicinity of Rumstick Road along Route 114, Rhode Island Route 136, and Massachusetts Route 136 to interchange with Interstate 195 near Exit 2 (now Exit 5) in Swansea, Massachusetts. From there it would have proceeded north and west, roughly along Route 118 (including a cloverleaf interchange with U.S. Route 44 in Rehoboth) to end at the Interstate 295/Interstate 95 interchange in Attleboro, Massachusetts, where the mainline would have continued as I-295.

The original route was cancelled in 1971 due to community opposition, with Rhode Island officials designing an alternate route. At this time, Massachusetts cancelled the portion of the highway between I-195 in Swansea and the I-295/I-95 interchange in Attleboro because of community opposition in Swansea, Rehoboth, Attleboro, and nearby Dighton.

=== Alternate route ===
Interstate 895's alternate route was planned after the original route was cancelled in 1971 due to community opposition. The alternate route would have been far longer than the original, but would have provided access to Newport.

The route would have started at Route 138 in Richmond where it would have headed to U.S. Route 1 via a never-built freeway. At U.S. Route 1, that freeway would have connected to the present-day Route 138 freeway via a nearly-completed cloverleaf interchange with Route 1. It would then travel over the Jamestown-Verrazano Bridge and the Newport Pell Bridge to Newport. From the Newport Pell Bridge, it would have traveled north through Aquidneck Island using one of two possible alignments. One alignment was directly along the west shore of the island and the second alignment was between Route 114 and Route 138. At the northern end of Aquidneck Island, the highway would have proceeded over the Mount Hope Bridge (a new span would have been built next to the existing span to accommodate southbound traffic), then along Route 136 through Bristol and Warren, and into Massachusetts along Route 136 to interchange with Interstate 195 near Exit 5 (old exit 2) in Swansea, Massachusetts. From there it would have proceeded north and west, roughly along Route 118 to end at the Interstate 295/Interstate 95 interchange in Attleboro, Massachusetts.

This route was also met with much opposition from residents in the communities affected. This opposition, combined with the discovery of a Civil War-era cemetery along one of the proposed Aquidneck Island alignments, caused Rhode Island and Massachusetts to briefly consider putting Interstate 895 along Rhode Island Route 24 and Massachusetts Route 24, though nothing ever came of those plans and eventually all plans for Interstate 895 were abandoned.

== Existing pieces ==
The Interstate 295/Interstate 95 interchange in Attleboro, Massachusetts, is a half-cloverleaf with space left for connector ramps to Interstate 895. Later (post I-895) plans indicated an Attleboro Connector, but the ramps have since been straightened.41.9558°N 71.3025°W

The stub ramps of the partially completed Newport Bridge Access Road in Newport (originally intended to terminate at Route 214 in Middletown) would have provided connections for the never-built part of Interstate 895 through Newport. One of these stubs now connects to a nearby Mainstay hotel.41.5089°N 71.3146°W The access road to the Newport Bridge was reconfigured and remodeled in 2022, and the ramps and exit bridge initially built for 895 was removed from Route 138 in 2023. According to the Rhode Island Department of Transportation, the highway section of Route 138 was initially intended to meet up with Rhode Island Route 24 in Portsmouth but was not completed.

The interchange in Rhode Island with U.S. Route 1 at end of the Route 138 freeway was a half-cloverleaf with space left for connector ramps to the never-built section of freeway between U.S. Route 1 and Interstate 95. In the summer of 2008, the rest of the cloverleaf was completed for u-turns on US-1.41.5300°N 71.4661°W
