= Rhode Island Route 37 =

State highway in Rhode Island, US

Route 37
- Route 37 highlighted in red

Route information
- Maintained by RIDOT
- Length: 3.47 mi (5.58 km)
- Existed: 1963–present

Major junctions
- West end: Natick Avenue in Cranston
- I-295 in Cranston; I-95 in Warwick
- East end: US 1 in Warwick

Location
- Country: United States
- State: Rhode Island
- Counties: Providence, Kent

Highway system
- Rhode Island Routes
← Route 33	→ US 44

Route 37 is a state highway running 3.47 miles (5.58 km) in Providence County and Kent County, Rhode Island, United States. A freeway for its entire length, it serves the cities of Cranston and Warwick and is also a major east–west freeway in the Providence metropolitan area, linking T. F. Green Airport with Interstate 295. The western terminus of Route 37 is an at-grade intersection with Natick Avenue in Cranston. The freeway has numbered interchanges with I-295, Rhode Island Route 2, Pontiac Avenue, and I-95 before terminating at a trumpet interchange with U.S. Route 1 in Warwick.

Originally conceived as a freeway linking Scituate with suburban Warwick, the proposed alignment of Route 37 was later shortened to an alignment linking I-295 with I-95. Construction on the freeway began in 1963 and was completed by 1969. An eastward extension across upper Narragansett Bay was proposed in 1966; this proposal would have extended Route 37 north to I-195 and I-295 in Attleboro, Massachusetts, completing a beltway around the city of Providence. This extended route was approved and given the I-895 designation in 1968, but the extension was ultimately canceled by the Rhode Island Department of Transportation (RIDOT). In the 1980s, Route 37 was included in proposals for an eastward extension of Interstate 84 from Hartford, Connecticut, to Rhode Island, but this alignment was also canceled. RIDOT has long-range plans to extend Route 37 east to Route 117 in Downtown Warwick, but plans for a westward extension have been abandoned.

== Route description ==
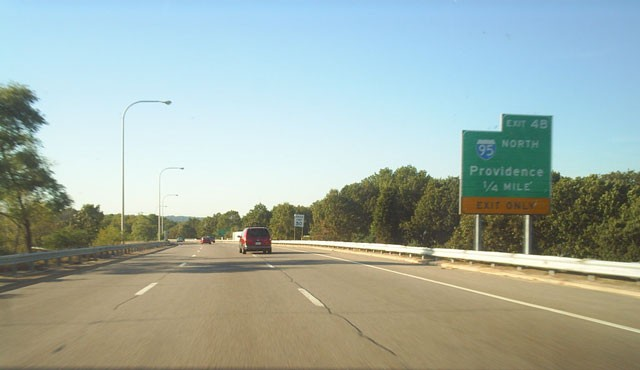
Westbound Route 37 near the intersection with I-95 north in Warwick

Route 37 begins at an at-grade intersection with Natick Avenue in the city of Cranston; Natick Avenue is an unnumbered road that is used to access Rhode Island Route 51 (Phenix Avenue). Shortly after the intersection with Natick Avenue, Route 37 begins to head in a northeastern direction and has its first numbered exit at a cloverleaf interchange with I-295. The interchange is signed as exits 1A-B from Route 37 west, but both the northbound and southbound lanes of I-295 are served via a single on-ramp from Route 37 east. After the junction with I-295, Route 37 passes through a densely settled region of Cranston and passes over Route 5 on a single-span bridge. After passing under Glen Hills Drive, the freeway turns to head in a southwestern direction before intersecting Route 2 at a cloverleaf interchange signed as exits 1C-D.

After the interchange with Route 2, Route 37 passes over Power Road before intersecting with Pontiac Avenue, an unnumbered, four-lane highway in Cranston (exit 1E). Shortly after exit 1E, Route 37 crosses over the Pawtuxet River and enters the city of Warwick. In Warwick, the freeway has a complicated interchange with I-95 that is signed as exits 2A–B. From westbound Route 37, exit 2B is a right-hand exit that is used to access I-95 north, while exit 2A is a left-hand exit that is used to access I-95 south. Both ramps from eastbound Route 37 are right-hand exits.

After the I-95 interchange, Route 37 widens to three lanes in each direction. The freeway crosses Jefferson Boulevard and Amtrak's Northeast Corridor railroad on twin-span bridges and passes to the north of the Lincoln Park Cemetery before interchanging with US 1 at exits 3A–B. The freeway terminates at a trumpet interchange with US 1, with the two left-hand lanes defaulting onto US 1 north and the right-hand lane serving US 1 south, which connects to T. F. Green Airport.

== History ==
=== Construction of the freeway ===
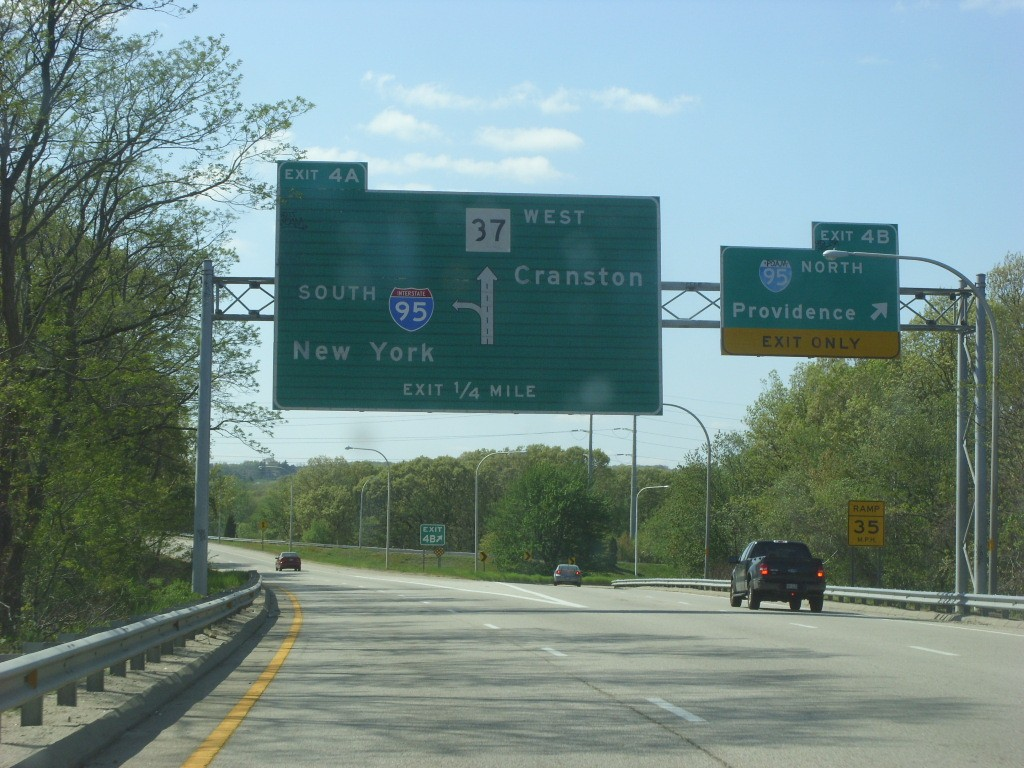
Route 37 west at the interchange with I-95 in Warwick

The origins of Route 37 date back to 1956, when the Rhode Island Department of Public Works (RIDPW) included the Route 37 Expressway on its list of proposed freeways for the state of Rhode Island. The freeway was originally proposed to begin at Route 116 in Hope, a village of Scituate, and extend east through Cranston to Route 117 in Warwick. The route would also have connections with the proposed I-295 in Cranston and I-95 in Warwick.

In 1959, RIDPW approved construction of the expressway, amending the proposed route to an alignment extending roughly from I-295 to a junction with Route 10 (Huntington Expressway) in Warwick; Route 10 would be extended south to Warwick as part of the plan. The routing was officially designated as Route 37, but was at one time referred to as the "Lincoln Avenue Freeway" after a local road in Warwick that the new route would bypass. RIDPW originally planned to begin construction in 1960, but it was delayed until 1963 due to ongoing construction projects with I-95 and I-195 in Providence. Route 37 was routed through mostly undeveloped land in the cities of Warwick and Cranston, and in 1969, the construction of the freeway to an interchange with US 1 in Warwick was completed. The proposed southern extension of Route 10 was ultimately canceled by RIDPW.

=== Proposed extensions ===
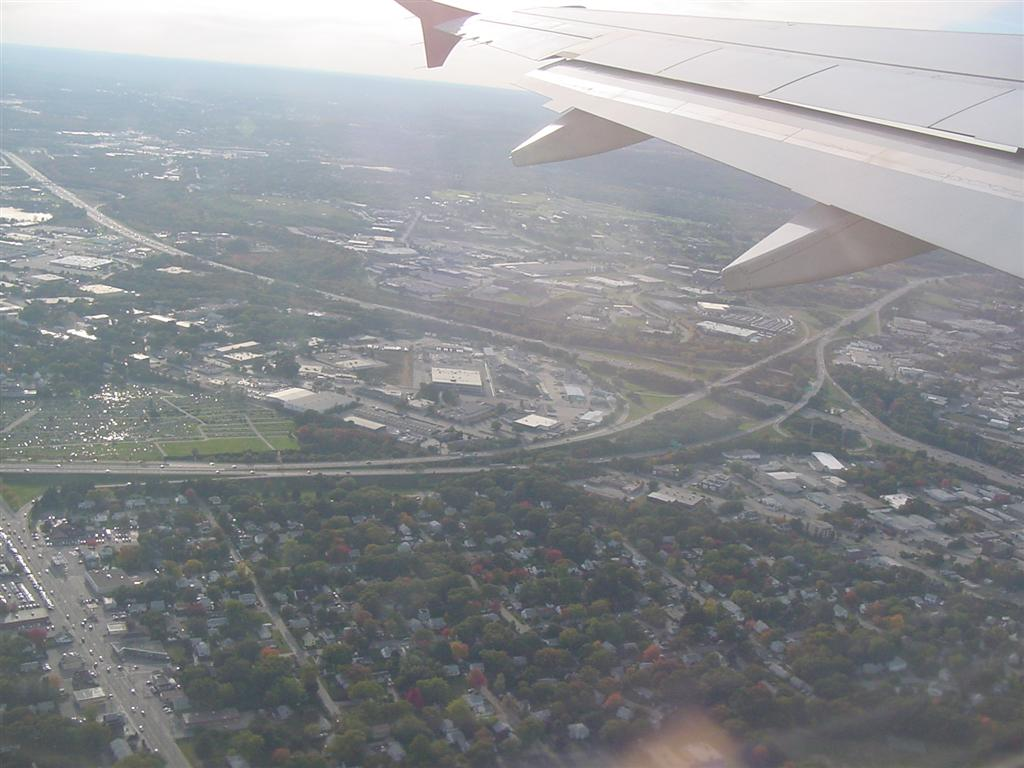
Aerial view of the junction with I-95 in Warwick

In 1966, Route 37 was included in a proposal to extend I-295 across Narragansett Bay to make a full beltway around the city of Providence. The plan, which was approved by both RIDPW and the Massachusetts Highway Department (MassHighway), involved extending Route 37 eastward from its existing terminus at US 1 across Narragansett Bay via a new bridge that would connect Warwick with the town of Barrington. The expressway would then head northward into the town of Warren, intersecting I-195 in the town of Swansea after crossing into Massachusetts. Eventually, the freeway would connect with I-295 at its existing northern terminus in Attleboro, Massachusetts.

In 1969, the Federal Highway Administration (FHWA) designated the proposed expressway as I-895 instead of the originally proposed I-295. The expressway was planned to extend the existing Route 37 by 24.4 miles (39.3 km), and was scheduled to be completed by 1975. In 1971, however, the expressway's original routing was canceled due to community opposition in the towns of Barrington and Warren and concerns that a new bridge across Upper Narragansett Bay would interfere with aviation traffic at T. F. Green Airport. In 1971, RIDOT submitted a new proposed alignment for I-895 that utilized the Jamestown and Newport Bridges in southern Newport County and bypassed Barrington and Warwick altogether, but the interstate was ultimately canceled in 1982.

In 1981, ten years after the eastern extension of Route 37 was canceled, RIDOT began planning studies for a western extension of the freeway. The expressway was included in a proposal to extend I-84 eastward from Hartford, Connecticut, to Providence; more northern alignments for the freeway had been rejected due to concerns of potential damage to the Scituate Reservoir. The southern routing of I-84, which would have utilized Route 37 and terminated in Warwick, largely bypassed the reservoir's watershed. In 1982, however, I-84 was officially canceled by RIDOT after studies indicated that the southern alignment was not a feasible alternative.

In 1992, RIDOT reviewed plans for an eastern extension of Route 37. The department conducted planning studies on two proposed freeway alignments that would extend Route 37 into Downtown Warwick. The first proposal continued the freeway southeast from US 1 to Airport Road for 0.75 miles (1.2 km), while the second proposal extended the freeway east for 1.5 miles (2.4 km), intersecting Route 117 and Route 117A in the village of Hoxsie before terminating at Route 117 (West Shore Road). The first option was ultimately dropped by RIDOT after studies indicated the routing would interfere with aviation traffic at T. F. Green Airport. The freeway extension to Route 117 remained on RIDOT's long-term plans, but this has since been abandoned as well.

=== Recent history ===
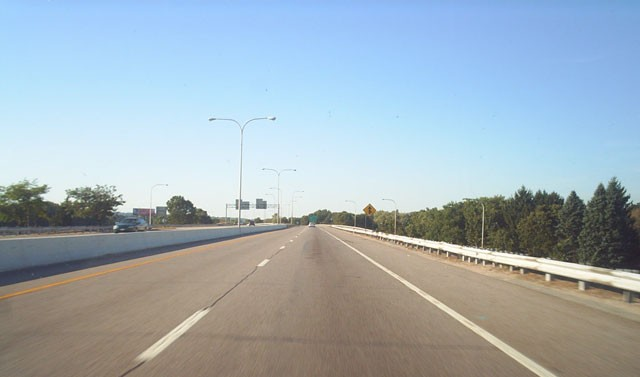
Westbound Route 37 in Cranston

In June 2006, erosion resulting from heavy rains exposed human remains near the westbound lanes of Route 37 in Cranston. Subsequent drainage improvements to the freeway led to the discovery of human remains from more than 70 individuals buried in late 19th and early 20th centuries. Archaeological research indicated that the portion of Route 37 in Cranston between Exits 2 and 3 was inadvertently constructed over a portion of the State Farm Cemetery in the 1960s. The cemetery's wooden burial markers had deteriorated by the time Route 37 was constructed, and environmental studies that would have indicated the location of the cemetery were not conducted prior to the expressway's construction. In late 2006, the remains of 71 individuals were exhumed from the site of the previous cemetery and re-interred at the State Institution Cemetery in Warwick. On July 14, 2009, RIDOT hosted a memorial service for the 71 people re-interred in Warwick.

A 2021 investigation by WPRI-TV revealed that the remains of at least 1,000 individuals remained buried under Route 37 after the Rhode Island Department of Transportation built the highway over State Farm Cemetery in the 1960s and inadvertently did not exhume and remove the remains. The findings were confirmed by an RIDOT spokesperson.

RIDOT was rewarded a $25 million federal grant was awarded to rehabilitate six bridges along Route 37. However, RIDOT is also planning to eliminate the bridge over Power Road and downgrade the Post Road (US 1) eastern terminus interchange to an at-grade signalized intersection.

== Exit list ==
RIDOT is currently in the process of converting its sequential exit numbering to mileage-based numbering to conform with federal highway standards. In November 2019, RIDOT announced that Route 37 would be part of the third round of exit renumbering to begin on/after December 9, 2019.

County	Location	mi	km	Old exit	New exit	Destinations	Notes
Providence	Cranston	0.00	0.00		—	Natick Avenue to Route 51	At-grade intersection
Providence	Cranston	0.07	0.11	1A–B	1A–B	I-295 to I-95 – Smithfield, New York	Signed as exits 1A (south) and 1B (north) westbound
Providence	Cranston	1.03	1.66	2A–B	1C–D	Route 2 (Reservoir Avenue / New London Avenue)	Signed as exits 1C (south) and 1D (north)
Providence	Cranston	1.76	2.83	3	1E	Pontiac Avenue – John O. Pastore Government Center	
Pawtuxet River				Bridge			
Kent	Warwick	2.32	3.73	4	2	I-95 / Jefferson Boulevard – Providence, T. F. Green Airport, New York	Signed as exits 2A (I-95 south) and 2B (I-95 north/Jefferson Boulevard)
Kent	Warwick	2.99	4.81	5	3	US 1 (Post Road) – Warwick	Signed as exits 3A (south) and 3B (north)
1.000 mi = 1.609 km; 1.000 km = 0.621 mi
