= Wood River (Pawcatuck River tributary) =

River in Connecticut and Rhode Island, U.S.

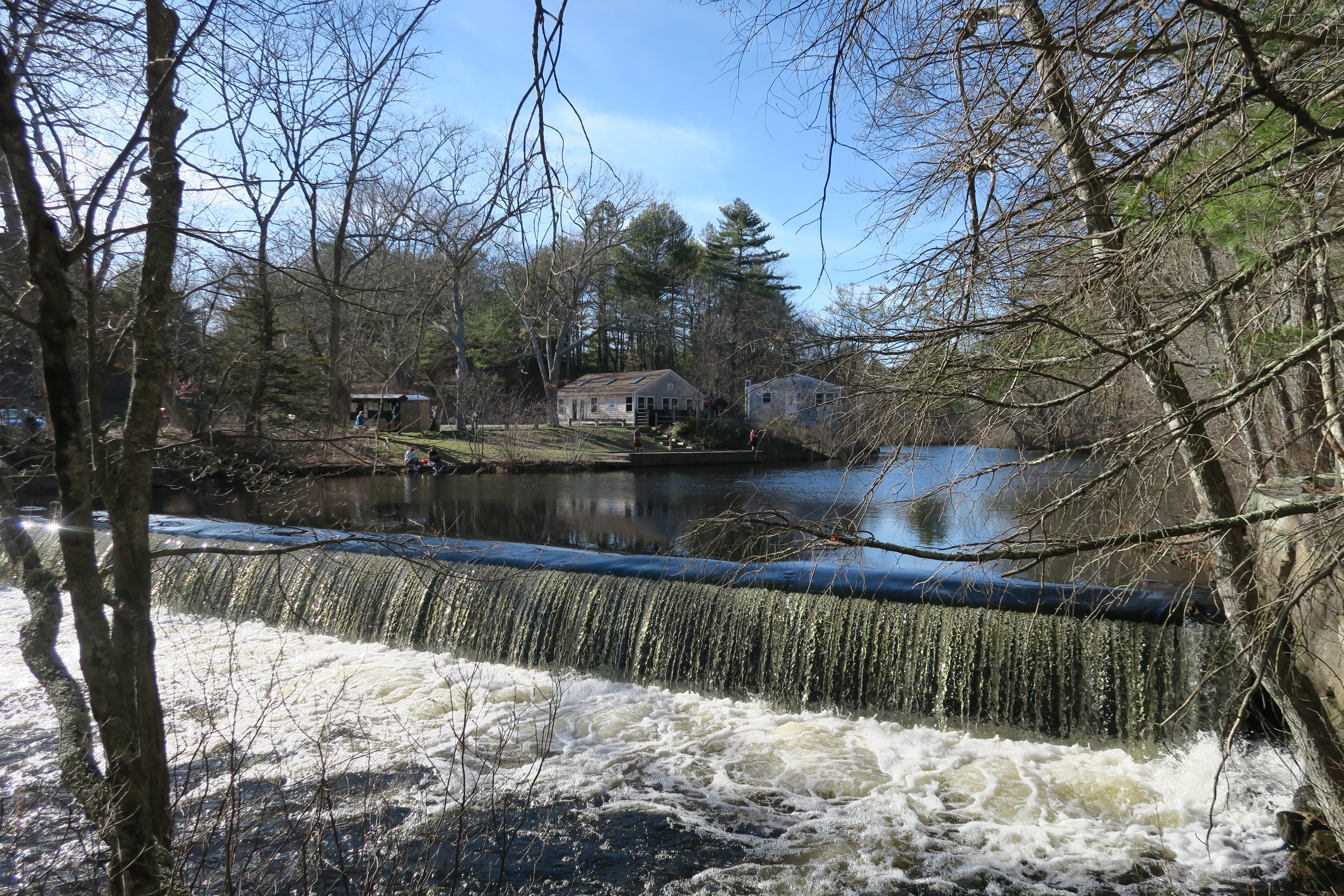

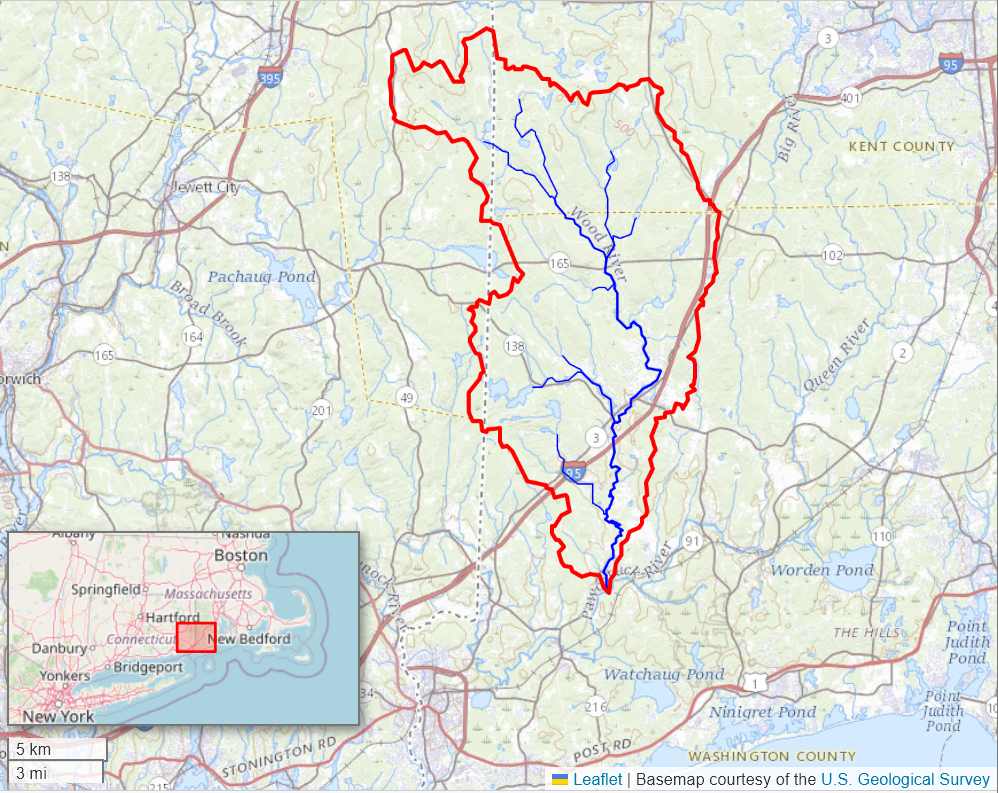
- Watershed of the Wood River

Physical characteristics
- Source: Cedar Swamp
  - location: ~1km east of Ekonk, Connecticut
  - coordinates: 41.652°N 71.830°W
  - elevation: 390 ft, 120 m
- Mouth: Confluence with the Pawcatuck River
  - location: ~1 km south of Alton, Rhode Island
  - coordinates: 41.428°N 71.719°E
  - elevation: 40 ft (12 m)
- Basin size: 230 km², 90 square miles

National Wild and Scenic River
- Designated: March 12, 2019

The Wood River is a river in the U.S. states of Connecticut and Rhode Island. It flows approximately 25 miles (40 km) and is a major tributary of the Pawcatuck River. There are eight dams along the river's length.

== Sources ==
The Wood River's source is in the swamps northwest of Porter Pond in Sterling, Connecticut. From there, it flows southeast to Hazard Pond, where the river crosses into Rhode Island. From the state line, it flows southeast past Escoheag Hill and over Stepstone Falls, then south through Beach Pond State Park where it receives the Flat River.

After receiving the Flat River, the Wood continues south through the Arcadia Management Area and into the towns of Richmond and Hopkinton, where it flows through the villages of Wyoming and Hope Valley. The river continues south through Hopkinton where it converges with the Pawcatuck River at the village of Alton. The Wood River serves as the border between Richmond and Hopkinton.

The upper Wood River, from its source to Stepstone Falls, is known locally as the Falls River.

== Major resource to the community ==
The Wood River, located in Southwestern Rhode Island, is a protected and beneficial source of water to the Northeast Corridor. The Wood River is one of the last remaining pristine bodies of water in the Northeast between New York and Boston. According to the Wood-Pawcatuck Watershed Association, "The Pawcatuck Watershed provides drinking water to over 100,000 residents". There are various laws that have been created in order to preserve this natural source. The Wood-Pawcatuck Watershed Association's (WPWA's) mission is to protect the land and water of the Wood-Pawcatuck River from any pollution, such as boating, in order to protect the water sources for more than ten towns. The River has been considered one of the most untouched for several years, thanks to the WPWA. The WPWA works to monitor the use of any non-electric-powered boats entering the river, as this could be a major cause of pollution. The Wood River is opposed to the use of any contaminating factors because so many people fish in the river and often eat the catch of the day. The water in the river is also used by visitors to and residents in the area.

There are several access points along the river. As well as being known as one of the most pristine rivers in the Northeast, the Wood River's pure waters also offer a source for several other activities and family fun. Families can enjoy boating and fishing all year long. Many visitors come to Rhode Island and Connecticut to enjoy canoeing, kayaking, fishing, and even hiking along the water's edge. With traffic being so heavy along the river, it is important to preserve the river. Cleanliness and fun at the river go hand in hand.

== Wood-Pawcatuck Watershed Association ==
The Wood-Pawcatuck Watershed Association (WPWA) is the main reason why the Wood River has remained so pure over the years. The WPWA monitors the use of non-electric-powered boats entering the river, a potential source of pollution for the river, its eco-system and surrounding land. The WPWA is opposed to the use of any contaminating factors because many people fish in the river and often eat the catch of the day. The river is used by visitors to the area and local residents. The U.S. Environmental Protection Agency stated that "The Pawcatuck Basin Aquifer System is the sole source of drinking water for the residents of that area; there are no viable alternative sources of sufficient supply; the boundaries of the designated area and project review area have been reviewed and approved by EPA; and if contamination were to occur, it would pose a significant public health hazard and a serious financial burden to the area's residents."

== Crossings ==
Below is a list of all crossings over the Wood River. The list starts at the headwaters and goes downstream.

- Sterling
  - Porter Pond Road
- West Greenwich
  - Hazard Road
  - Falls River Road
- Exeter
  - Ten Rod Road (RI 165)
  - Arcadia Road
- Richmond
  - Skunk Hill Road
  - Bridge Street
- Hopkinton
  - Main Street (RI 3)
  - Switch Road
  - Interstate 95
  - Hope Valley Road
  - Woodville Road
  - Church Street

== Tributaries ==
In addition to many unnamed tributaries, the following brooks and rivers feed the Wood:

- Carson Brook
- Kelley Brook
- Flat River
- Parris Brook
- Roaring Brook
- Baker Brook
- Brushy Brook
- Diamond Brook
- Canonchet Brook

== See also ==
- List of rivers in Connecticut
- List of rivers in Rhode Island
