= Rhode Island Route 115 =

State highway in Rhode Island, US

Route 115
- Route 115 highlighted in red

Route information
- Maintained by RIDOT
- Length: 6.4 mi (10.3 km)

Major junctions
- West end: Route 116 in Hope
- Route 2 in Warwick
- East end: Route 117 in Warwick

Location
- Country: United States
- State: Rhode Island
- Counties: Providence, Kent

Highway system
- Rhode Island Routes
← Route 114A	→ Route 116

Route 115 is a 6.4-mile-long (10.3 km) numbered state highway is the U.S. state of Rhode Island. Its western terminus is at Route 116 in Hope and its eastern terminus is at Route 117 in Warwick.

== Route description ==
Route 115 takes the following route through Rhode Island:

- Scituate: 0.8 miles (1.3 km); Route 116 to Cranston city line
  - Main Street, Jackson Flat Road and Main Street
- Cranston: 0.2 miles (0.32 km); Scituate town line to Coventry town line
  - Main Street
- Coventry: 0.7 miles (1.1 km); Cranston city line to West Warwick town line
  - Main Street
- West Warwick: 2.2 miles (3.5 km); Coventry town line to Warwick city line
  - Main Street, [Main Street, Pike Street] (East Main Street), East Main Street and Providence Street
- Warwick: 2.1 miles (3.4 km); West Warwick town line to Route 117
  - Toll Gate Road

== History ==
Toll Gate Road is named such because it used to be a connector road to a toll gate for the old New London Turnpike.

== Major intersections ==
County	Location	mi	km	Destinations	Notes
Providence	Hope	0.0	0.0	Route 116 (Main Street)	Western terminus
Kent	West Warwick	2.3	3.7	Route 51 north (Phenix Avenue)	Southern terminus of Route 51
Kent	West Warwick	3.3	5.3	Route 33 south (Main Street)	Western terminus of concurrency with Route 33
Kent	West Warwick–Warwick line	4.3	6.9	Route 33 north (Providence Street)	Eastern terminus of concurrency with Route 33
Kent	Warwick	4.8	7.7	Route 2 (Bald Hill Road)	
Kent	Warwick	6.4	10.3	Route 117 (Centreville Road)	Eastern terminus
1.000 mi = 1.609 km; 1.000 km = 0.621 mi: Concurrency terminus

== Notes ==
From the point where Providence Street intersects New London Avenue to the turn onto Toll Gate Road, Route 115 runs on the Warwick/West Warwick town line with Route 115 Eastbound running in Warwick and Route 115 Westbound running in West Warwick.
