= Rhode Island Route 118 =

State highway in Kent County, Rhode Island, US

Route 118
- Harkney Hill Road

Route information
- Maintained by RIDOT
- Length: 5.5 mi (8.9 km)
- Existed: c. 1999–present

Major junctions
- West end: Route 102 in Coventry
- East end: Route 3 in Coventry

Location
- Country: United States
- State: Rhode Island
- Counties: Kent

Highway system
- Rhode Island Routes
← Route 117A	→ Route 120

Route 118 is a numbered state highway in the U.S. state of Rhode Island, running 5.5 miles (8.9 km) along Harkney Hill Road from Route 3 to Route 102 in Coventry. It is one of the more recent state highways, having been designated and signed c. 1999.

== Route description ==
Route 118 begins at Route 102 (Victory Highway) in rural Coventry and heads east on a two-lane road through a heavily forested area. It curves to the north around the Quidnick Reservoir, then heads southeast into the Big River Management Area. Here, the road crosses Reynolds Pond, then bends to the northeast and crosses Maple Root Pond. Northeast of Maple Rood Pond, Route 118 meets its eastern terminus at a T-intersection with Route 3 (Nooseneck Hill Road).

== Major intersections ==
The entire route is in Coventry, Kent County.

mi	km	Destinations	Notes
0.0	0.0	Route 102 (Victory Highway) to I-95	Western terminus
5.5	8.9	Route 3 (Nooseneck Hill Road)	Eastern terminus
1.000 mi = 1.609 km; 1.000 km = 0.621 mi
