= Smith Hill Historic District =

Historic district in Rhode Island, United States

- U.S. National Register of Historic Places
- U.S. Historic district
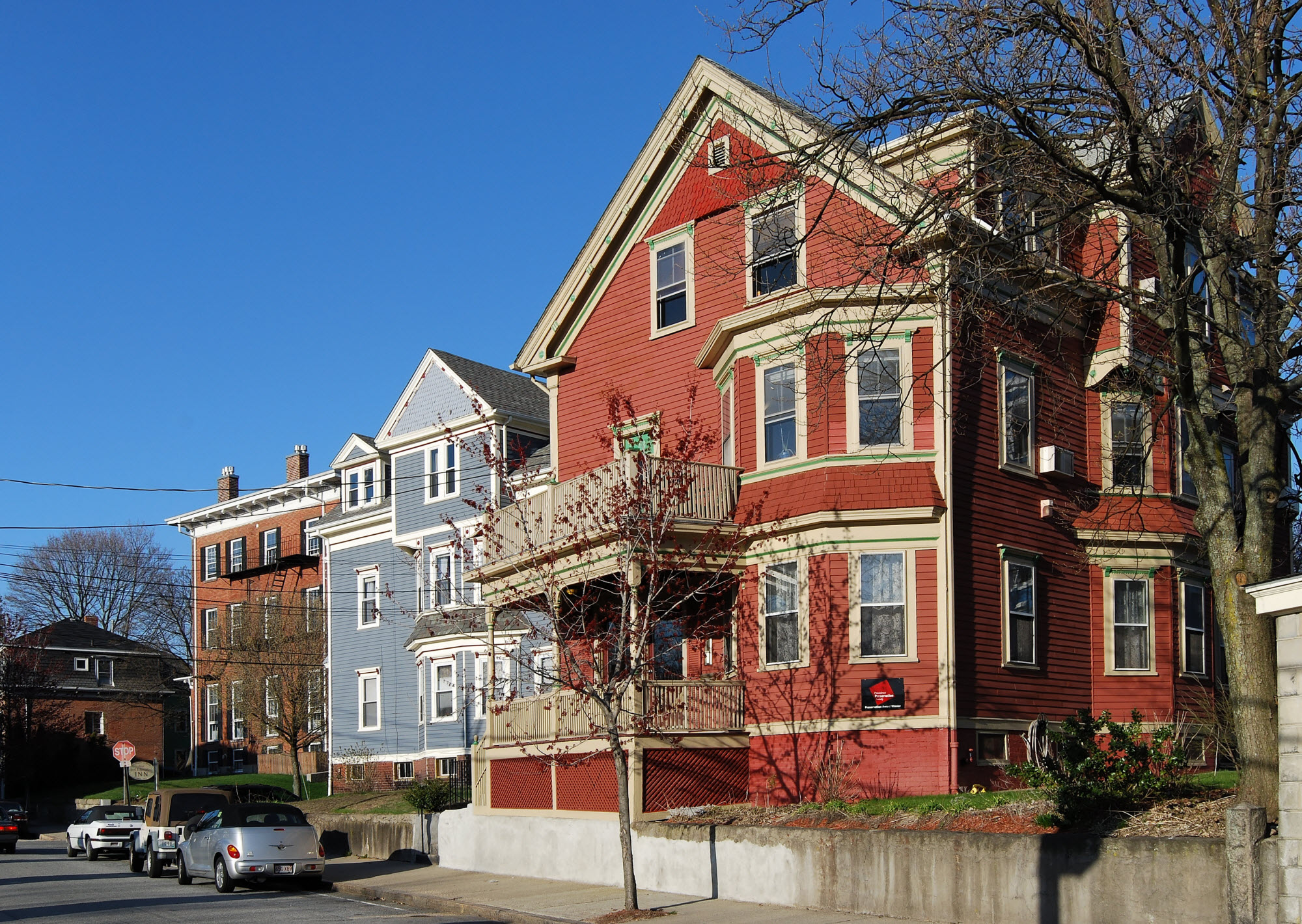
- Holden Street Providence, part of Smith Hill Historic District

- Location within Rhode Island Location within the United States
- Location: Providence, Rhode Island
- Coordinates: 41°49′55″N 71°25′25″W
- Architectural style: Italianate, Greek Revival
- NRHP reference No.: 93001183
- Added to NRHP: November 4, 1993

The Smith Hill Historic District is a historic district located in northwestern Providence, Rhode Island, just west of the Rhode Island State House and Interstate 95. It includes 57-65 Brownell Street, 73-114 Holden Street, 23-80 Jewett Street, 189-240 Smith Street and 10-18 W. Park Street. This area is a densely built residential section, an isolated remnant of what was once a larger residential area. Most of the 41 properties are residential units built between 1870 and 1930, and are typically 2-1/2 or 3 1/2 stories in height. They are set on lot sizes ranging generally from 3000 to 5000 square feet, and are set close to the sidewalk. The only major non-residential buildings are St. Patrick's School at 244 Smith Street and "The Mohican" at 185-189 Smith Street; the latter is an Art Deco brick and concrete commercial block two stories in height.

The district was added to the National Register of Historic Places in 1993.

== See also ==
- National Register of Historic Places listings in Providence, Rhode Island
