= Rhode Island Route 113 =

State highway in Kent County, Rhode Island, US

Route 113

Route information
- Maintained by RIDOT
- Length: 3.4 mi (5.5 km)
- Existed: By 1969–present

Major junctions
- West end: Route 2 in Warwick
- I-295 / I-95 in Warwick; US 1 in Warwick
- East end: Route 117 in Warwick

Location
- Country: United States
- State: Rhode Island
- Counties: Kent

Highway system
- Rhode Island Routes
← Route 112	→ Route 114

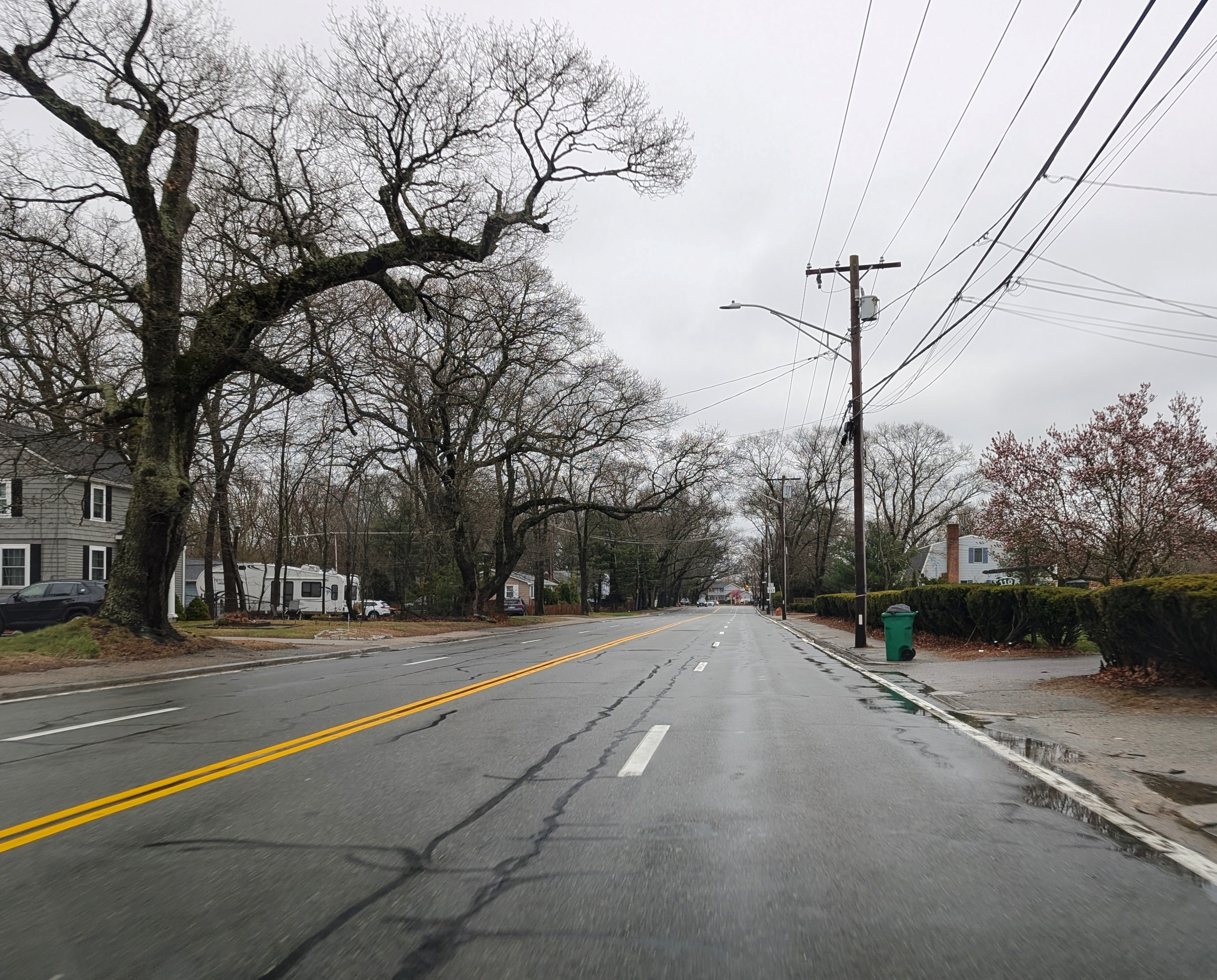
RI 113 eb approaching RI 117

Route 113 is a numbered state highway running 3.4 miles (5.5 km) in Rhode Island, USA. The route connects Route 2 and Route 117 in the city of Warwick.

== Route description ==
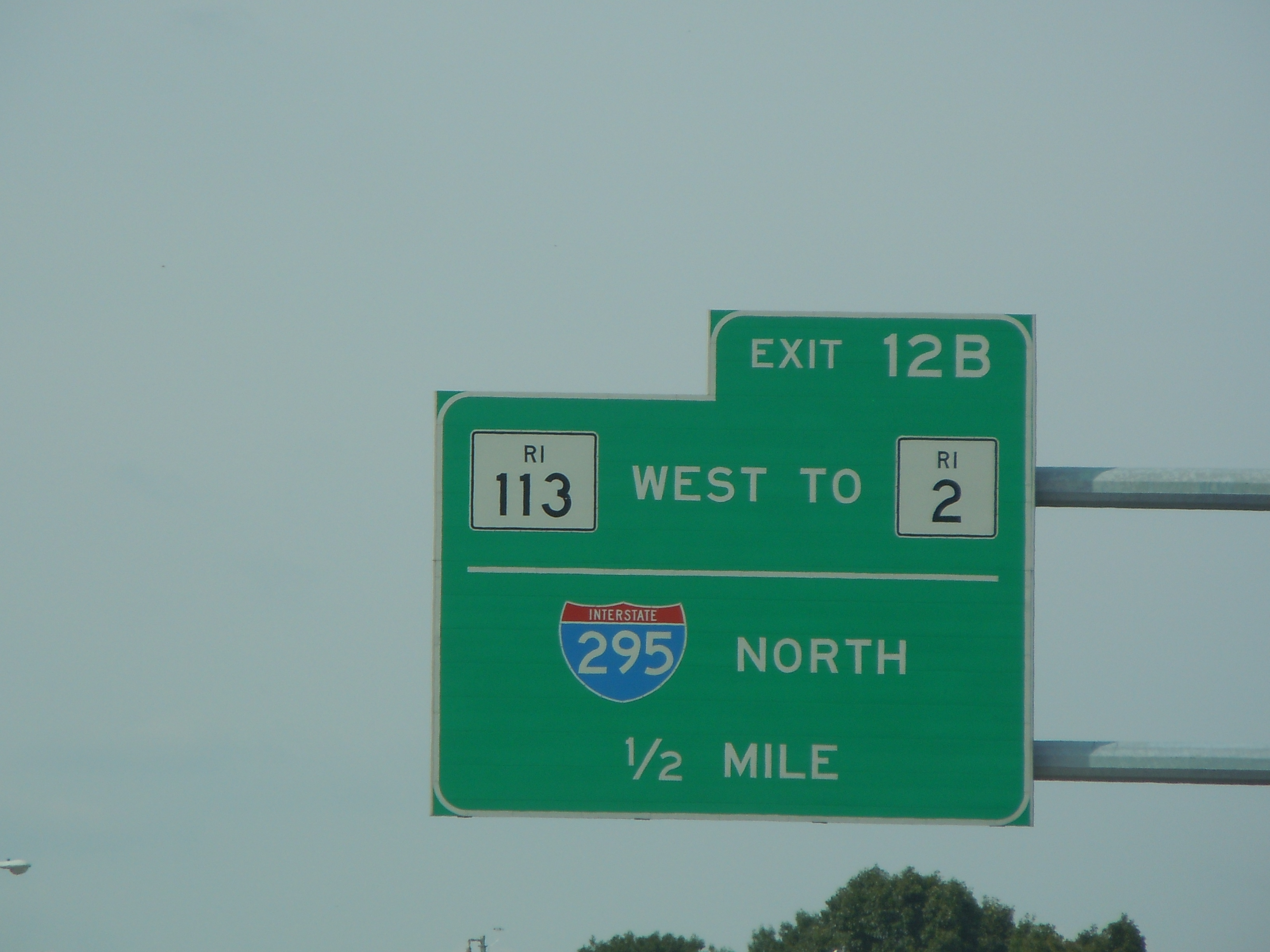
RI 113 exit along I-295 in Warwick

Route 113 begins as East Avenue at Route 2 (Bald Hill Road) in the East Natick section of Warwick, near the Rhode Island Mall. Past the mall, Route 113 crosses over the southern junction of Interstate 95 (I-95) and I-295. There is no access from Route 113 to northbound I-295. Soon after the 95/295 junction, Route 113 intersects with Route 5 (Greenwich Avenue) and continues eastward as Main Avenue. Route 113 then crosses over U.S. Route 1 (US 1) at a grade-separated intersection south of TF Green International Airport in the Greenwood neighborhood. Route 113 ends in Warwick center at Route 117 (West Shore Road).

== History ==
Route 113 was assigned to its current routing by 1969.

== Major intersections ==
The entire route is in Warwick, Kent County.

mi	km	Destinations	Notes
0.0	0.0	Route 2 (Bald Hill Road)	Western terminus
0.5– 0.9	0.80– 1.4	I-295 / I-95 – Providence, New York City	Exit 1A on I-295, exit 28 on I-95, no entrance to northbound I-295 from Route 113
1.2	1.9	Route 5 (Greenwich Avenue)	
2.1	3.4	US 1 north – T. F. Green Airport	Southbound exit and northbound entrance from US 1
3.4	5.5	Route 117 (West Shore Road)	Eastern terminus
1.000 mi = 1.609 km; 1.000 km = 0.621 mi: Incomplete access
