= Pawtucket River Bridge =

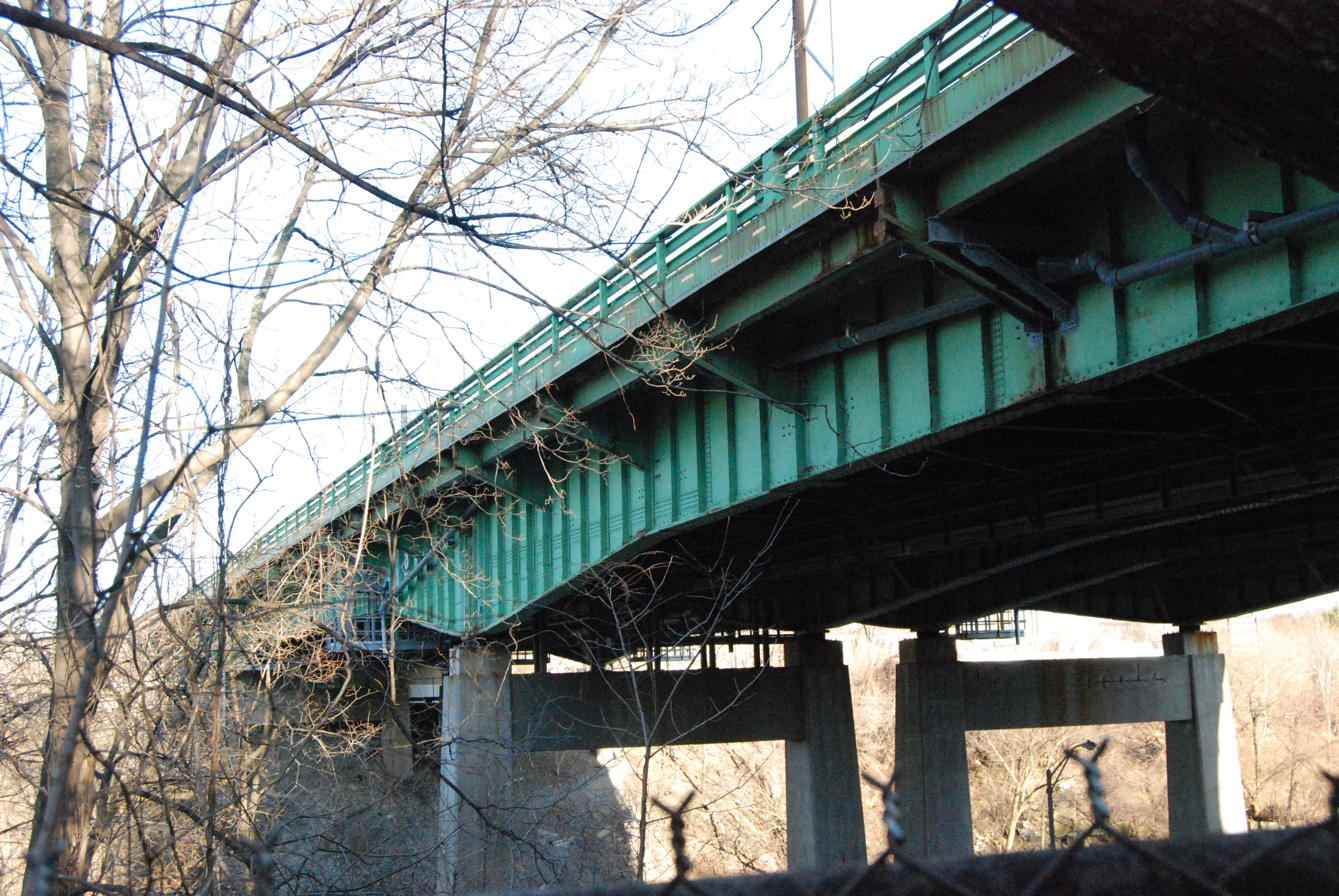
- 2010 view from Pleasant Street, before renovation
- Coordinates: 41.87336°N 71.3844°W
- Carries: I-95
- Crosses: Seekonk River
- Locale: Pawtucket, Rhode Island
- Maintained by: RIDOT

History
- Opened: 1958; 67 years ago (original span); 2013; 12 years ago (new span)
- Closed: 2012; 13 years ago (original span)

Statistics
- Daily traffic: 162,000 (2010)

The Pawtucket River Bridge is a twin span, six-lane highway bridge that carries Interstate 95 (I-95) over the Pawtucket River in Pawtucket, Rhode Island. The original bridge was built in 1958 and rehabilitated in 1996. The bridge was demolished in 2012-13 and replaced with a new deck arch bridge that was completed in summer 2013. In November 2016, the bridge was officially renamed the James E. Doyle Pawtucket River Bridge in memory of the former mayor of Pawtucket, who died two months earlier.

== Deterioration ==
In November 2007, in the aftermath of the I-35W Mississippi River bridge collapse in Minnesota, the Pawtucket River Bridge was declared structurally deficient and in danger of further deterioration, forcing the State of Rhode Island to ban vehicles with more than 2 axles and weight over 18 short tons (16 t). Truck drivers violating this restriction faced fines of $3,000 per violation. State police vehicles were posted on both sides of the bridge to enforce the restriction. Truckers were required to seek alternate routes, often exiting and passing through residential neighborhoods in Pawtucket and Central Falls, Rhode Island. Residents of these cities complained about the traffic, noise, and road deterioration that these trucks are causing.

Truckers continued to cross the bridge in spite of the fines. From November 2007 through February 2009, state police issued more than 5,600 violation notices and more than $3 million in fines. In 2011, it was reported that the state government of Rhode Island had collected around $7 million in fines. The state has not shared the revenues with the cities of Pawtucket and Central Falls, which bear the brunt of the detours that the truckers must take. With the opening of the new South 95 bridge on September 15, 2012, the axle restriction has ceased.

== Replacement ==
In 2010, construction began on a new replacement bridge that was built in three phases, beginning with a new span to the south of the old one, which opened to northbound traffic in early 2012. The original northbound span was then demolished and rebuilt. In September 2012, the new middle span opened to temporary southbound traffic, ending all weight restrictions on the Pawtucket River Bridge. The original southbound span was then demolished and rebuilt. The new $82 million bridge was completed in summer 2013 and all traffic shifted to their permanent lanes.
