= Wyoming, Rhode Island =

Census-designated place in Rhode Island, United States

- Wyoming Village Historic District
- U.S. National Register of Historic Places
- U.S. Historic district
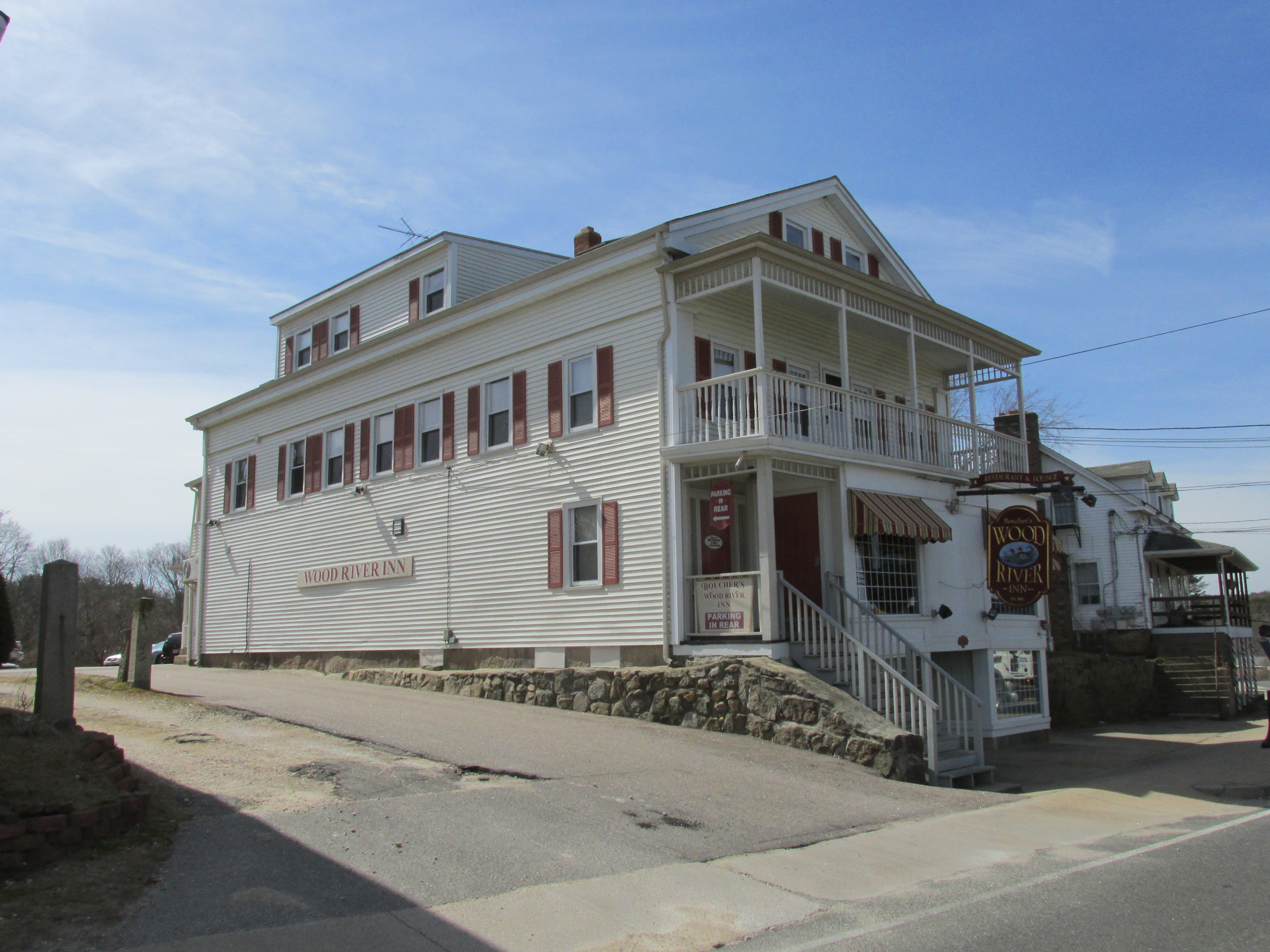
- Wood River Inn

- Location within Rhode Island Location within the United States
- Location: Roughly bounded by RI 138, RI 3, Old Nooseneck Hill Rd., Bridge and Prospect Sts., Richmond, Rhode Island
- Coordinates: 41°30′57″N 71°42′12″W
- Architectural style: Greek Revival, Late Victorian, Federal
- NRHP reference No.: 74000014
- Added to NRHP: May 2, 1974

Wyoming is a village and census-designated place on the Wood River in southern Rhode Island, United States, primarily in the town of Richmond, but extending north across the river (which defines the town line) into the town of Hopkinton. As of the 2020 census, Wyoming had a population of 415. It is the site of the Wyoming Village Historic District and a post office, assigned ZIP code 02898.

== History ==
The village was settled in 1757 and was the site of industrial activity early in its history due to the ready availability of hydropower from the river. Brand's Iron Works existed on the Hopkinton side of the river by 1787, and Brothers Cotton Mill was established on the Richmond side of Wyoming in 1814. The New London Turnpike (Rhode Island Route 3) was built through the area in 1815. Also in 1815 a tavern was established on the Richmond side of the river to serve travelers on the turnpike. Two more textile mills were built on the Richmond, circa 1830 and 1845; they were later destroyed by fire.

In 1970, Interstate 95 was constructed a short distance east of Wyoming, with an exit close to the village. Proximity to the highway has led to commercial and residential development in and near the village.

=== Historic district ===
The Wyoming Village Historic District is a historic district roughly bounded by Rhode Island Routes 138 and 3, Old Nooseneck Hill Road, Bridge and Prospect Streets in Richmond. The district, which includes Brand's Ironworks, includes examples of Greek Revival, Late Victorian, and Federal architecture and was added to the National Register of Historic Places in 1974. Prospect Street on the Hopkinton side of the river is a residential neighborhood that grew up in the mid-19th century in connection with the growth of the textile industry in Wyoming; it includes several Greek Revival houses built between 1846 and 1850. The historic district covers properties in both the towns of Richmond and Hopkinton, with a total area of 570 acres (230 ha), almost one square mile.

== Geography ==
According to the United States Census Bureau, the Wyoming CDP has a total area of 0.91 square miles (2.3 km^{2}), of which 0.86 square miles (2.2 km^{2}) is land and 0.05 square miles (0.1 km^{2}) (4.96%) is water.

== Demographics ==
The portion of Wyoming in the town of Hopkinton is included in the census-designated place of Hope Valley.

=== 2020 census ===
The 2020 United States census counted 415 people, 182 households, and 80 families in Wyoming. The population density was 481.4 inhabitants per square mile (185.9/km^{2}). There were 195 housing units at an average density of 226.2 per square mile (87.3/km^{2}). The racial makeup was 92.05% (382) white or European American (92.05% non-Hispanic white), 0.0% (0) black or African-American, 0.72% (3) Native American or Alaska Native, 1.2% (5) Asian, 0.0% (0) Pacific Islander or Native Hawaiian, 0.48% (2) from other races, and 5.54% (23) from two or more races. Hispanic or Latino of any race was 2.17% (9) of the population.

Of the 182 households, 19.2% had children under the age of 18; 47.3% were married couples living together; 20.3% had a female householder with no spouse or partner present. 20.3% of households consisted of individuals and 5.5% had someone living alone who was 65 years of age or older. The average household size was 2.9 and the average family size was 2.9. The percent of those with a bachelor’s degree or higher was estimated to be 0.0% of the population.

11.8% of the population was under the age of 18, 9.4% from 18 to 24, 25.8% from 25 to 44, 29.9% from 45 to 64, and 23.1% who were 65 years of age or older. The median age was 47.5 years. For every 100 females, the population had 101.5 males. For every 100 females ages 18 and older, there were 102.2 males.

The 2016–2020 5-year American Community Survey estimates show that the median household income was $55,714 (with a margin of error of +/- $26,762) and the median family income was $55,714 (+/- $26,762). Approximately, 0.0% of families and 0.0% of the population were below the poverty line, including 0.0% of those under the age of 18 and 0.0% of those ages 65 or over.

== See also ==
- National Register of Historic Places listings in Washington County, Rhode Island
