= Flat River (Wood River tributary) =

River in Rhode Island, United States

The Flat River is a river in the U.S. state of Rhode Island. It flows approximately 5 km (3 mi). There are no dams along the river's length.

== Course ==
The river is formed in West Greenwich by the confluence of Phillips and Acid Factory Brooks. The river then flows due south to Exeter where it flows into the Wood River.

== Crossings ==
Plain Road in Exeter is the only crossing over the Flat River due to its short length.

== Tributaries ==
Breakheart Brook is the Flat River's only named tributary, though it has many unnamed streams that also feed it.

== See also ==
- List of rivers in Rhode Island
- Flat River (Kent County)
