= Rhode Island Route 2 =

State highway in Rhode Island, United States

Route 2
- Route 2 highlighted in red

Route information
- Maintained by RIDOT
- Length: 33.6 mi (54.1 km)
- Existed: ca 1934–present

Major junctions
- South end: US 1 in Charlestown
- Route 4 in North Kingstown; I-95 in Warwick; I-295 in Warwick; Route 37 in Cranston; Route 10 in Providence
- North end: US 1 in Providence

Location
- Country: United States
- State: Rhode Island
- Counties: Washington, Kent, Providence

Highway system
- Rhode Island Routes
← Route 1C	→ Route 3

Route 2 is a 33.6-mile (54.1 km) state highway in Rhode Island, that runs from U.S. Route 1 in Charlestown to US 1 in Providence.

== Route description ==
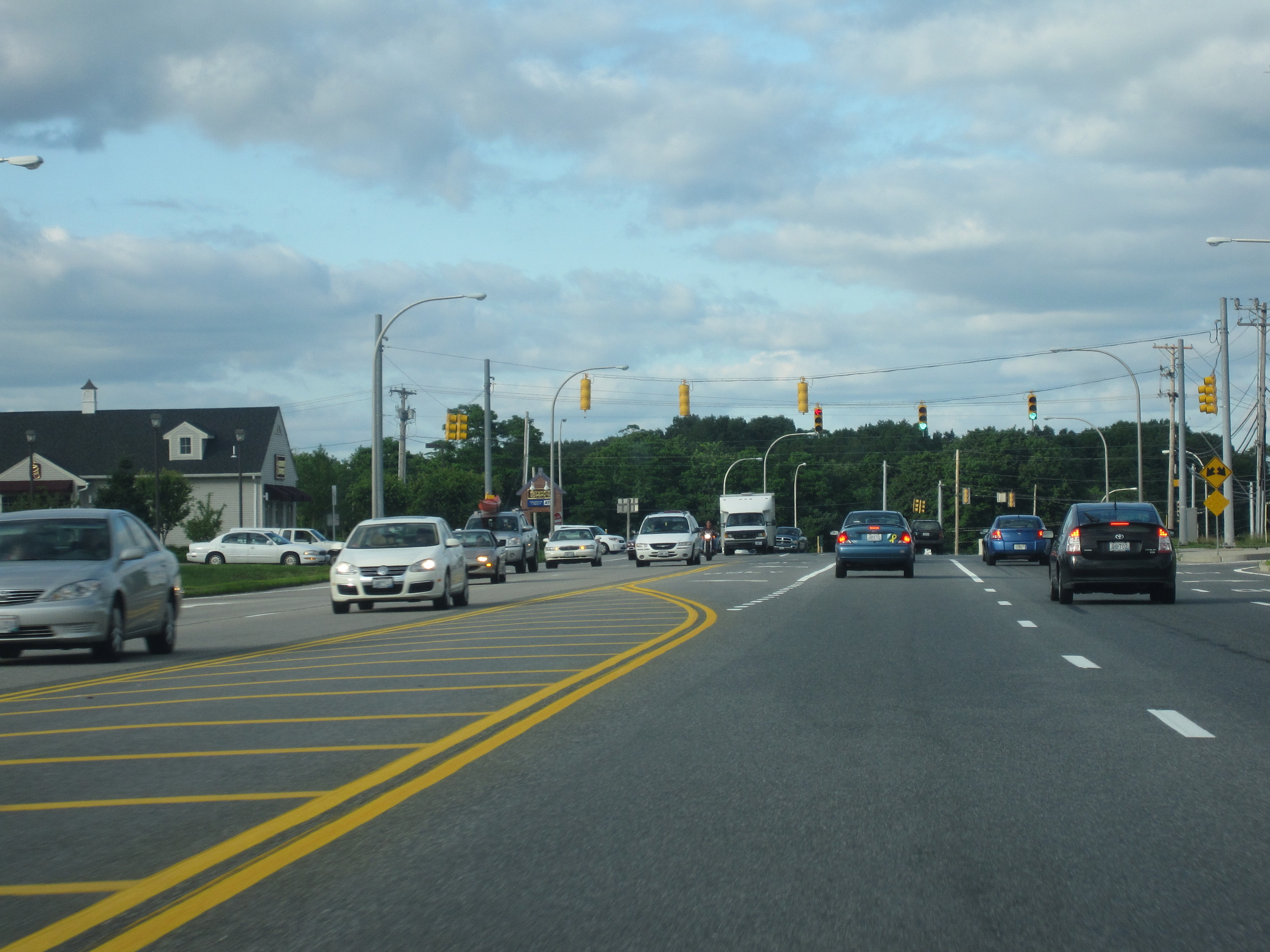
Route 2's concurrency with Route 102 in North Kingstown, July 2009

Route 2 starts at US 1 in Charlestown, which is also the southern terminus of Route 112. Route 2 and Route 112 continue north, and Route 2 splits off to the northeast before intersecting with Route 138. Continuing in a northeast direction, Route 2 has a short concurrency with Route 102 in North Kingstown. It then turns to the north and parallels Route 4 until reaching Interstate 95. Route 2 passes the eastern terminus of Route 3 before reaching an interchange with Interstate 295. It continues through downtown Cranston and has interchanges with Route 37 and Route 10 before reaching its northern terminus at US 1 slightly inside the city line of Providence. Route 2 is a heavily traveled highway in Cranston and Warwick as it is a major commercial corridor.

== History ==
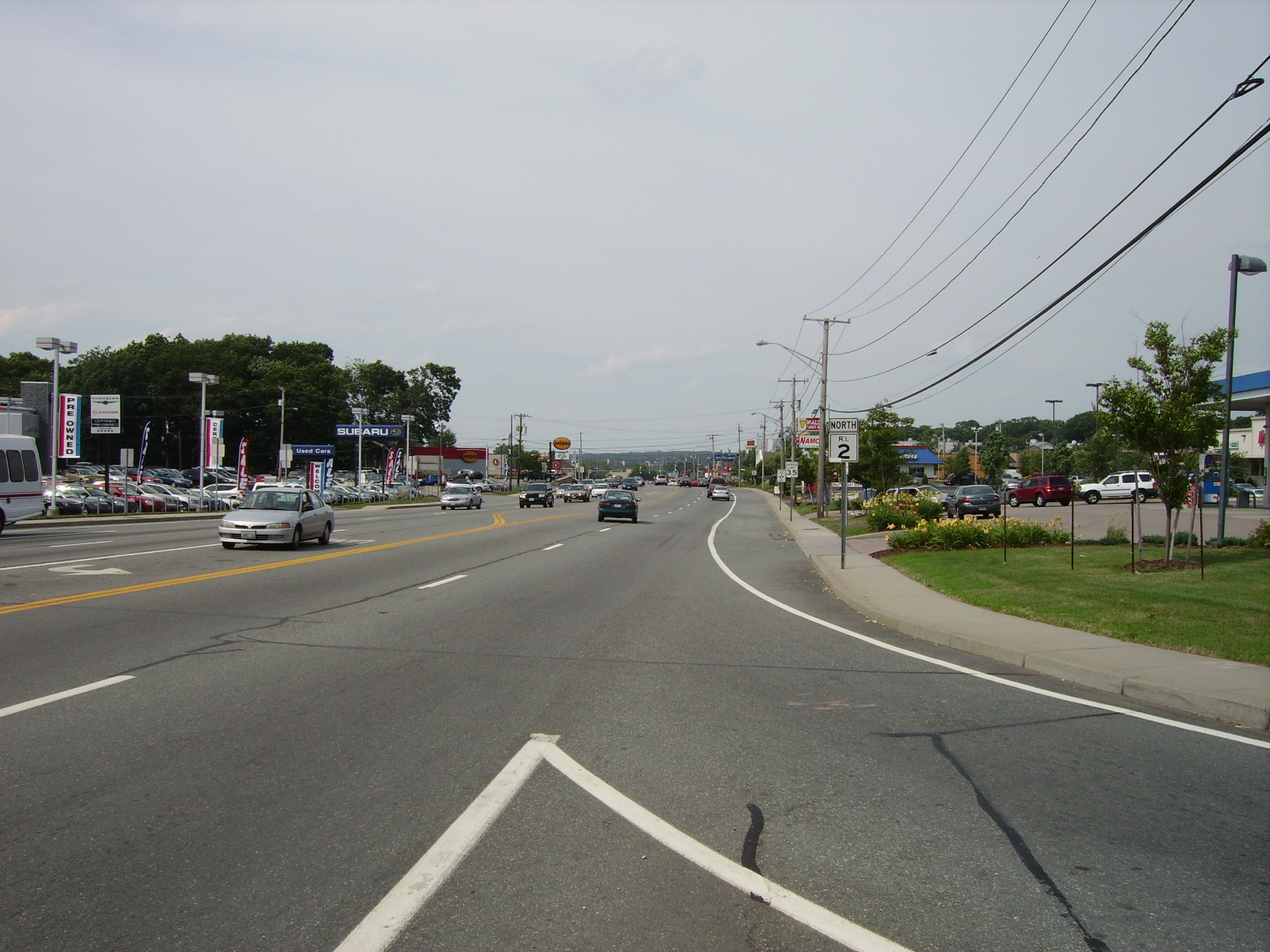
Route 2 (Bald Hill Road) at Tollgate Road, facing north towards Cranston, July 2007

By 1939, Route 2 was paved with concrete between the split from Route 112 and Route 12. It had short overlaps with Route 117 and Route 5, both of which have been eliminated with interchanges.

For a brief time during the construction of the Route 10 freeway, Route 2 left Reservoir Avenue in Cranston and turned north onto the current Route 10 freeway, ending at the Olneyville exit.

== Major intersections ==
County	Location	mi	km	Destinations	Notes
Washington	Charlestown	0.0	0.0	US 1 (Commodore Perry Highway) / Route 112	Southern terminus; southern terminus of Route 112; south end of concurrency with Route 112
Washington	Charlestown	3.0	4.8	Route 112 north (Carolina Back Road)	North end of concurrency with Route 112
Washington	South Kingstown	9.6	15.4	Route 138 (Kingstown Road) to I-95	
Washington	North Kingstown	16.4	26.4	Route 102 north (Ten Rod Road)	South end of concurrency with Route 102
Washington	North Kingstown	17.1	27.5	Route 4 to I-95 – Providence, Narragansett	Exit 3 on Route 4
Washington	North Kingstown	17.4	28.0	Route 102 south (Ten Rod Road)	North end of concurrency with Route 102
Kent	East Greenwich	19.7	31.7	Route 4 to I-95 – Providence, Narragansett	Exit 5 on Route 4
Kent	East Greenwich	20.6	33.2	Route 402 east (Frenchtown Road) – Davisville, Quonset Point	West end of Route 402
Kent	East Greenwich	23.1	37.2	Route 401 east (Division Road) to I-95 north / Route 4 south	West end of Route 401
Kent	Warwick	23.3	37.5	I-95 south – Westerly, New York	Exit 24 on I-95
Kent	Warwick	24.6	39.6	Route 3 south (Cowesett Avenue)	North end of Route 3
Kent	Warwick	25.4	40.9	Route 117 – Apponaug, Arctic	Interchange
Kent	Warwick	26.4	42.5	Route 115 (Toll Gate Road)	
Kent	Warwick	27.1	43.6	Route 113 east (East Avenue) to I-95	West end of Route 113
Kent	Warwick	27.5	44.3	I-295	Same directional access only (e.g. north-to-north), exit 1B on I-295
Kent	Warwick	27.8	44.7	Natick Road – Warwick Mall	
Providence	Cranston	28.4	45.7	Route 33 south – West Warwick, Arctic	Interchange, no northbound exit, north end of Route 33
Providence	Cranston	28.6	46.0	Route 5 (Oaklawn Avenue)	Interchange
Providence	Cranston	29.2	47.0	Brayton Avenue	Interchange, southbound exit and entrance
Providence	Cranston	29.9	48.1	Route 37 to I-95 / I-295 / US 1 – T.F. Green Airport	Exit 1 on Route 37
Providence	Cranston	30.3	48.8	Sockanosset Cross Road / Dean Parkway	
Providence	Cranston	30.8	49.6	Garden City Center	Interchange, southbound exit and northbound entrance
Providence	Cranston	32.2	51.8	Route 12 (Park Avenue)	
Providence	Providence	32.7	52.6	Route 10 to I-95	Exit 2A on Route 10
Providence	Providence	33.6	54.1	US 1 (Elmwood Avenue)	Northern terminus
1.000 mi = 1.609 km; 1.000 km = 0.621 mi: Concurrency terminus; Incomplete access

== See also ==
- List of state highways in Rhode Island
