= Rhode Island Route 165 =

State highway in Washington County, Rhode Island, US

Route 165
- Ten Rod Road
- Route 165 highlighted in red

Route information
- Maintained by RIDOT
- Length: 7.1 mi (11.4 km)

Major junctions
- West end: Route 165 at the Connecticut state line
- East end: Route 3 in Exeter

Location
- Country: United States
- State: Rhode Island
- Counties: Washington

Highway system
- Rhode Island Routes
← Route 152	→ Route 177

Route 165 is a 7.1-mile-long (11.4 km) numbered state highway in the U.S. state of Rhode Island. It runs from the Connecticut state line east to Route 3 in Exeter. It runs entirely on Ten Rod Road, where one rod is 16.5 feet and so ten rods is 165 feet, matching the route number.

== Route description ==
Route 165 enters Rhode Island on a causeway over Beach Pond. It travels east through the woods along Ten Rod Road. Shortly before its eastern end, the highway passes beneath Interstate 95, however Route 165 does not connect directly to the Interstate. It ends at an intersection with Nooseneck Hill Road, which carries Route 3.

== Major intersections ==
The entire route is in Exeter, Washington County.

mi	km	Destinations	Notes
0.0	0.0	Route 165 west (Beach Pond Road)	Continuation into Connecticut
7.1	11.4	Route 3 (Nooseneck Hill Road) to I-95	Eastern terminus
1.000 mi = 1.609 km; 1.000 km = 0.621 mi
