= Rhode Island Route 33 =

State highway in Rhode Island, US

Route 33
- Route 33 highlighted in red

Route information
- Maintained by RIDOT
- Length: 6.8 mi (10.9 km)

Major junctions
- South end: Route 3 in Coventry
- Route 116 in Coventry; Route 115 in West Warwick
- North end: Route 2 in Cranston

Location
- Country: United States
- State: Rhode Island
- Counties: Kent, Providence

Highway system
- Rhode Island Routes
| ← Route 24 | → Route 37 |

Route 33 is a state highway in the U.S. state of Rhode Island. It runs approximately 6.8 miles (10.9 km) from Route 3 in Coventry to Route 2 in Cranston.

== Route description ==
Route 33 starts at an intersection with Rhode Island Route 3 in Coventry. It runs north and crosses the South Branch Pawtuxet River before turning east to form a concurrency with Rhode Island Route 117. Route 33 splits off to the northeast and continues along the bank of the South Branch Pawtuxet River. It forms a concurrency with Rhode Island Route 115, crosses over the river, leaves Route 115, and then continues north over the Pawtuxet River. Route 33 crosses over I-295 without an interchange, and ends at Rhode Island Route 2 in Cranston. From the split with New London Avenue in Cranston to the Pawtuxet River, Route 33 runs on the Warwick/West Warwick town line. Route 33 northbound runs in Warwick and Route 33 southbound runs in West Warwick.

== History ==
Most of Route 33, excluding Sandy Bottom Road in Coventry, was an old alignment of Route 3 and Route 1A.

== Major intersections ==
| County | Location | mi | km | Destinations | Notes |
|---|---|---|---|---|---|
| Kent | Coventry | 0.0 | 0.0 | Route 3 (Tiogue Avenue) | Southern terminus |
| Kent | Coventry | 0.5 | 0.80 | Route 117 west (Main Street) | Southern end of Route 117 concurrency |
| Kent | Coventry | 0.7 | 1.1 | Route 116 north (Knotty Oak Road) | Southern end of Route 116 |
| Kent | Coventry | 2.1 | 3.4 | Route 117 east (West Warwick Avenue) | Northern end of Route 117 concurrency |
| Kent | West Warwick | 3.1 | 5.0 | Route 115 west (Main Street) | Southern end of Route 115 concurrency |
| Kent | West Warwick–Warwick line | 4.6 | 7.4 | Route 115 east (Toll Gate Road) | Northern end of Route 115 concurrency |
| Providence | Cranston | 6.5 | 10.5 | Route 2 south (Bald Hill Road) | Interchange; northbound exit only |
| Providence | Cranston | 6.8 | 10.9 | Route 2 north (New London Avenue) | Northern terminus; interchange |
1.000 mi = 1.609 km; 1.000 km = 0.621 mi: Concurrency terminus; Incomplete access
