= Rhode Island Route 3 =

State highway in Rhode Island, US

Route 3
- Nooseneck Hill Road
- Route 3 highlighted in red

Route information
- Maintained by RIDOT
- Length: 30.1 mi (48.4 km)
- Existed: mid-1930s–present

Major junctions
- South end: US 1 in Westerly
- I-95 in Hopkinton; Route 138 in Hopkinton; Route 102 in Exeter; I-95 in West Greenwich
- North end: Route 2 in Warwick

Location
- Country: United States
- State: Rhode Island
- Counties: Washington, Kent

Highway system
- Rhode Island Routes
← Route 2	→ Route 4
← Route 1	N.E.	→ Route 2

Route 3 is a 30.1-mile-long (48.4 km) state highway in the U.S. state of Rhode Island. Route 3 serves as a local alternative to Interstate 95 (I-95) as it parallels I-95 for almost its entire length. Route 3 in West Warwick was the site of The Station nightclub fire.

== Route description ==
Route 3 starts at US 1 in Westerly. It begins heading north, and it has a partial interchange with the Westerly Bypass. Route 3 continues north, intersects I-95 at exit 1, and turns to the northeast to parallel I-95. After two more interchanges with I-95, Route 3 passes through downtown Coventry. Continuing east into West Warwick, Route 3 terminates at Route 2 on the West Warwick/Warwick town line.

== History ==
In about 1835, the New London Turnpike was established as the primary road between Providence, Rhode Island and New London, Connecticut. As such, it was one of the earliest interstate highways in the country. The New London Turnpike proved a viable alternative to the Old Post Road, which followed the coastal route, as it was more direct and faster.

The New London Turnpike (also called New London Avenue in parts of Rhode Island and the Gold Star Highway in Connecticut) was a primary route until the advent of automobiles in the early 20th century. The increased need for roadways led to the development of a more improved interstate highway system. The Connecticut portion of the New London Turnpike became Route 184, and in Rhode Island parts of the New London Turnpike are on Routes 2 and 3.

In 1922, the Westerly–Providence road was assigned New England Interstate Highway 1A, as an alternate to New England Interstate Highway 1. The road was only paved north of Nooseneck Hill. When NE 1 became US 1 in 1927, NE 1A became Route 1A (now assigned to a different route).

The original NE 1A alignment differed from the current Route 3 alignment in the following places:

- On a 1922 map, the main road appears to follow Route 3 out of downtown Westerly and then Potter Hill Road, and either Maxson Street and Route 3 or Laurel Street into Ashaway.
- Maxson Hill Road and Town House Road from Ashaway to Hopkinton.
- Bank Street, Arcadia Road, Route 165, Black Plain Road and Austin Road from Locustville to Austin. An old bridge still exists over a creek just north of Route 165, a bit east of the intersection with Arcadia Road.
- Weaver Hill Road and Kitts Corner Road north of Nooseneck Hill.
- Lake Drive and Mishnock Road, and then Maple Root Road and Route 118.
- South Main Street and Route 117 through Washington.

From there, the main road used Route 33 to where the Meshanticut Interchange is now, and then roughly Route 2 (though the exact route is unclear; it may have originally used Cranston Street into Westminster Street) to end concurrent with US 1 and Route 2 in Providence, possibly at Broad Street (former Route 117).

By 1934, the number had been changed to Route 3, and it was on its current alignment (though still extending north to Providence, via Route 2 and US 1), and was fully paved with concrete except for a bit in downtown Westerly (and along Route 2 and US 1 north of Route 12). Route 3 was part of a major through route, serving as a cutoff for US 1, along with Rhode Island–Connecticut Route 84. In fact, in 1947, Connecticut proposed moving US 1 to this route, but RIDOT declined, wanting US 1 to continue through the shore towns. RIDOT offered US 1A as a compromise, but this was never signed. The old alignment through Washington to the Meshanticut Interchange site became Route 3A and later Route 33; by 1939 this was on its current alignment, bypassing Washington.

1952 and 1953 saw the building of a new high-speed relocation of Route 3 from Route 84 to north of Wyoming, where Route 3 left the New London Turnpike. This was built as a four-lane surface road, with interchanges at the Route 3/Route 84 split and Route 138.

When the Huntington Expressway was built in 1959, Route 2 was moved onto it, leaving Route 3 as the only road on Reservoir Avenue north of the Expressway. Later the Expressway was designated Route 10, and Route 2 was moved back. At or after that time, Route 3 was truncated to Route 2.

In 1957 and 1958, the Kent County Freeway was built, splitting from Route 3 near Nooseneck Hill and heading east to Route 2. The original designation of this is unknown. However, the westernmost section carried Route 3, at least southbound, due to southbound access along the old road being cut off at the merge. This access was brought back in 1969 when the freeway extension was built to the south.

1959 also saw the assignment of the Interstate Highways, including I-95 along the Route 3 corridor. Route 84 and Route 3 were temporarily designated Route 95 from Connecticut to the beginning of the Kent County Freeway, which was I-95. Route 3 was moved back to the old alignment at the 1952–1953 relocation.

The southernmost several blocks in Westerly may have at one time used Canal Street and one of the diagonal streets to cut over to current Route 3.

== Major intersections ==
County	Location	mi	km	Destinations	Notes
Washington	Westerly	0.0	0.0	US 1 (Broad Street)	Southern terminus
Washington	Westerly	0.5	0.80	Route 91 east (Oak Street)	
Washington	Westerly	1.2	1.9	High Street to Route 78 west / I-95 – Connecticut	Exit 1 (Route 78)
Washington	Westerly	1.9	3.1	Route 78 east – Westerly Airport, Misquamicut State Beaches	
Washington	Ashaway	4.5	7.2	Route 216 north (High Street)	South end of concurrency with Route 216
Washington	Ashaway	4.6	7.4	Route 216 south (Ashaway Road)	North end of concurrency with Route 216
Washington	Hopkinton	6.3	10.1	I-95 – Providence, New London, New York	Exit 1 on I-95
Washington	Hope Valley	11.9	19.2	Route 138 west (Spring Street)	South end of concurrency with Route 138
Washington	Wyoming	12.8	20.6	Route 138 east (Main Street) to I-95	North end of concurrency with Route 138
Washington	Richmond	14.9	24.0	I-95 south	Exit 9 on I-95 northbound
Washington	Exeter	18.0	29.0	Route 165 west (Ten Rod Road)	East end of Route 165
Washington	Exeter	19.1	30.7	Route 102 south (Victory Highway) – Wickford, Newport	South end of concurrency with Route 102
Washington	Exeter	19.3	31.1	Route 102 north (Victory Highway) to I-95 – Providence, Westerly	
Kent	West Greenwich	23.9	38.5	I-95 – Providence, Westerly	Exit 18 on I-95
Kent	Coventry	25.2	40.6	Route 118 west – Summit, Greene	East end of Route 118
Kent	Coventry	27.6	44.4	Route 33 north (Sandy Bottom Road)	South end of Route 33
Kent	Warwick			Providence-New London Pike	East end of New London Pike
Kent	Warwick	30.1	48.4	Route 2 (Quaker Lane) to I-95	Northern terminus
1.000 mi = 1.609 km; 1.000 km = 0.621 mi: Concurrency terminus

== See also ==
- Numbered routes in Rhode Island
