= Rhode Island Route 117 =

State highway in Rhode Island, US

Route 117
- Route 117 highlighted in red

Route information
- Maintained by RIDOT
- Length: 28.4 mi (45.7 km)
- Existed: 1922–present

Major junctions
- West end: Route 14 in Coventry
- Route 102 in Coventry; Route 116 in Coventry; Route 2 in Warwick; I-95 in Warwick; US 1 in Warwick
- East end: US 1A in Cranston

Location
- Country: United States
- State: Rhode Island
- Counties: Kent, Providence

Highway system
- Rhode Island Routes
← Route 116	→ Route 118

Route 117 is a 28.4-mile-long (45.7 km) state route in the U.S. state of Rhode Island. Its western terminus is at Route 14 in Coventry, and its eastern terminus is at U.S. Route 1A (US 1A) in Cranston.

== Route description ==
- Coventry: 14.0 miles (22.5 km); Route 14 to West Warwick town line
  - Flat River Road, Main Street and Washington Street
- West Warwick: 1.8 miles (2.9 km); Coventry town line to Warwick city line
  - West Warwick Avenue, Main Street and Legris Avenue
- Warwick: 8.4 miles (13.5 km); West Warwick town line to Cranston city line
  - Legris Avenue, Centerville Road, [Post Road] (Greenwich Avenue, Veterans Memorial Drive, Post Road), West Shore Road, Shore Road and Warwick Avenue
- Cranston: 0.6 miles (1.0 km); Warwick city line to US 1A (Intersection of Warwick Avenue, Norwood Avenue and Broad Street)
  - Warwick Avenue

== History ==
Route 117 was one of the original Rhode Island State highways, instated in 1922. Its alignment has changed little since that time.

In the late 1990s, Route 117's eastern terminus was cut back. Originally, Route 117 stayed with Broad Street through Cranston and into Providence, ending at U.S. 1. The reason the eastern terminus was trimmed back is unclear.

== Major intersections ==
County	Location	mi	km	Destinations	Notes
Kent	Coventry	0.0	0.0	Route 14 (Plainfield Pike)	Western terminus
Kent	Greene	4.5	7.2	Route 102 (Victory Highway)	
Kent	Coventry	12.5	20.1	Route 33 south (Sandy Bottom Road)	Western terminus of concurrency with Route 33
Kent	Coventry	12.7	20.4	Route 116 north (Knotty Oak Road)	Southern terminus of Route 116
Kent	Coventry	14.0	22.5	Route 33 north (Main Street)	Eastern terminus of concurrency with Route 33
Kent	Warwick	16.0	25.7	Route 2 – Kent County Courthouse	Interchange
Kent	Warwick	17.1	27.5	I-95 – Providence, Westerly	Exit 27 on I-95
Kent	Warwick	17.7	28.5	Route 115 west (Toll Gate Road)	Eastern terminus of Route 115
Kent	Warwick	17.9	28.8	US 1 (Post Road) / Route 5 north (Greenwich Avenue)	Southern terminus of Route 5
Kent	Warwick	19.8	31.9	Route 113 west (Main Avenue)	Eastern terminus of Route 113
Kent	Warwick	21.2	34.1	Route 117A north (Oakland Beach Avenue)	Southern terminus of Route 117A
Kent	Warwick	25.2	40.6	Route 117A south (Warwick Avenue)	Northern terminus of Route 117A
Kent	Warwick	27.1	43.6	US 1A south (Post Road)	Western terminus of concurrency with US 1A
Pawtuxet River		27.6	44.4	Bridge	
Providence	Cranston	28.0	45.1	Route 12 west (Park Avenue)	Eastern terminus of Route 12
Providence	Cranston	28.4	45.7	US 1A north (Norwood Avenue) / Broad Street	Northern terminus; northern terminus of concurrency with US 1A
1.000 mi = 1.609 km; 1.000 km = 0.621 mi: Concurrency terminus

== Notes ==
Route 117 ends abruptly while concurrent with US 1A at the intersection of Broad Street, Warwick Avenue and Norwood Avenue. At this intersection, US 1A makes a turn off Broad Street onto Norwood Avenue while Route 117 ends.

== Route 117A ==
Route 117A
- Location: Warwick
- Length: 2.3 mi (3.7 km)

Route 117A is a numbered State Highway running 2.3 miles (3.7 km) in Rhode Island.

Route description
Route 117A takes the following route through the State:

- Warwick: 2.3 miles (3.7 km); Route 117 to Route 117
  - Oakland Beach Avenue
  - Warwick Avenue

Route 117A is a shorter route than the part of Route 117 that it bypasses.

Major intersections
The entire route is in Warwick, Kent County.

mi	km	Destinations	Notes
0.0	0.0	Route 117 (West Shore Road)	Southern terminus
0.6	0.97	Warwick Avenue	
0.8	1.3	Sandy Lane	
1.3	2.1	Church Avenue	
2.3	3.7	Route 117 (Warwick Avenue / West Shore Road)	Northern terminus
1.000 mi = 1.609 km; 1.000 km = 0.621 mi
