= Interstate 95 in Rhode Island =

Section of Interstate 95

Interstate 95
- I-95 highlighted in red

Route information
- Maintained by RIDOT
- Length: 42.36 mi (68.17 km)
- Existed: 1957–present
- NHS: Entire route

Major junctions
- South end: I-95 at the Connecticut state line in Hopkinton
- Route 4 in Warwick; I-295 in Warwick; Route 37 in Warwick; Route 10 in Cranston; US 1 in Providence; I-195 / US 6 in Providence; US 6 / Route 10 in Providence; Route 146 in Providence
- North end: I-95 at the Massachusetts state line in Pawtucket

Location
- Country: United States
- State: Rhode Island
- Counties: Washington, Kent, Providence

Highway system
- Interstate Highway System; Main; Auxiliary; Suffixed; Business; Future; Rhode Island Routes
← Route 94	→ I-95E

Interstate 95 (I-95) is the main north–south Interstate Highway on the East Coast of the United States, running generally southwest–northeast through the US state of Rhode Island. It runs from the border with Connecticut near Westerly, through Warwick and Providence, and to the Massachusetts state line in Pawtucket. It has two auxiliary routes, both of which enter Massachusetts—I-195, a spur from Providence east to Cape Cod, and I-295, a western bypass of the Providence metropolitan area.

South of Warwick, I-95 does not follow US Route 1 (US 1), which it generally replaced in New England. It instead takes a shorter inland route, parallel to Route 3. Route 3 was designated New England Route 1A in 1922, a New England Interstate Route, but it has never been a US Route.

== History ==
=== Southern Rhode Island ===
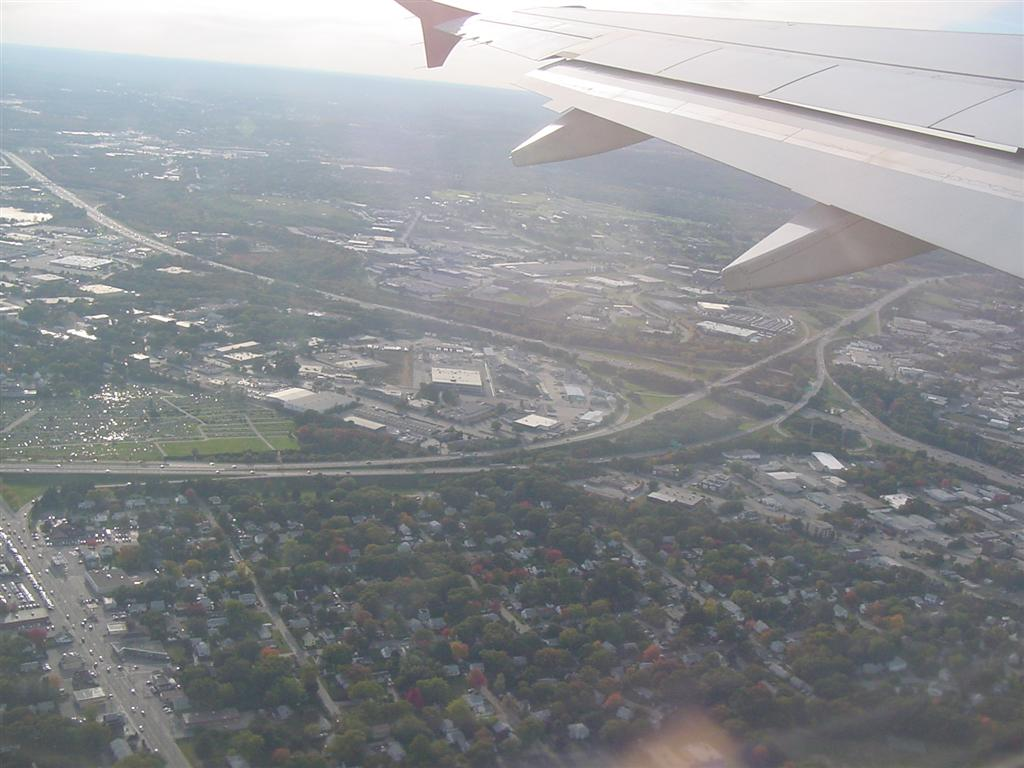
Junction with Route 37 in Warwick

The diagonal corridor of Route 3 was a well-traveled shortcut to the older US 1 even before any part of I-95 was built. In the 1930s, a further cutoff was built in southeastern Connecticut and southwestern Rhode Island, joining Old Mystic, Connecticut, to Route 3 in Hopkinton. The existing Connecticut Route 84 in Connecticut was rerouted to use the new road (now Connecticut Route 184), and the short piece in Rhode Island was also numbered Rhode Island Route 84 (Route 84). (This alignment had been the Hopkinton and Richmond Turnpike—better known as the New London Turnpike—but had fallen into disrepair.) The right-of-way of New London Turnpike goes through the Big River Management Area (as a dirt road), crosses Division Road as a four-way intersection with the north side of the turnpike paved, has an interchange with I-95 (exit 7), and continues for 1.85 miles (2.98 km) before connecting with Route 3 in West Warwick for a quarter mile (0.40 km). New London Turnpike turns into New London Ave and continues straight for 2.25 miles (3.62 km) before connecting with Providence Street (Route 33). It follows Providence Street until it hits the Meshanticut Interchange.

The first section of what is now I-95 was planned as an upgrade and relocation of Route 84 and Route 3 from the state line north of Westerly to existing Route 3 of Richmond. The short Route 84 was widened to a four-lane divided road with one intersection at Gray Lane. Instead of merging with Route 3, it was modified to continue northeast, passing under Route 3 with a folded diamond interchange (modern day exit 1). The rest of the new road was designated Route 3 once it was completed on December 12, 1955. It was not built to freeway standards, only having interchanges at Route 3 in Hopkinton and Route 138 in Richmond (a cloverleaf; modern day exit 3), as well as a bridge over the Wood River and Mechanic Street.

A section of freeway (known as the Kent County Freeway) opened in July 1958, running from Route 3 at Kitts Corner northeast across the Big River (modern day exit 6) and east across Route 3 to Route 2 on the West Warwick–Warwick line (modern day exit 8). Its west end was a simple intersection with old Route 3, in which only northbound traffic could continue on the old road—southbound traffic had to enter the new freeway east of the Big River. The only two interchanges were with Route 3 east of the Big River (a diamond interchange) and with Route 2 at its east end (a four-ramp interchange providing half the ramps of a cloverleaf).

The I-95 designation was approved on June 27, 1958. The section in southern Rhode Island was temporarily designated Rhode Island Route 95 (Route 95) until it could be upgraded to a freeway. This route ran from the Connecticut state line along what had been Route 84, continuing along the relocated Route 3 to north of Richmond, along normal Route 3 to Kitts Corner, and along the new freeway east to Route 2. As much as possible, Route 3 was moved back to the old road; it only used the new freeway by necessity in the area near Kitts Corner and over the Big River. Connecticut also renumbered their section of Connecticut Route 84 to Connecticut Route 95 at that time.

I-95 in Connecticut was finished December 12, 1964, to the Rhode Island state line, where it connected to the older Route 95 divided highway. The old road from the border to Gray Lane was combined with the frontage road built when Route 84 was upgraded to form what is now known as Extension 184. The portion from the Connecticut state line to Route 3 north of Richmond was upgraded to a freeway with construction ending May 1968. To the north, that freeway was connected with the Kent County Freeway by a new section, opened November 22, 1969, as the last section of I-95 in Rhode Island. The connection to Route 3 at Kitts Corner was removed, and Route 3 was moved back to the old road over the Big River. Route 95 was renumbered I-95, as the whole road was now a freeway.

An interchange with the New London Turnpike named exit 21 (old exit 7) was added to the Kent County Freeway by 1972. In 1983, a new interchange with Hopkins Hill Road named exit 19 (old exit 6A) opened.

=== Providence area ===
The construction of I-95 split the city of Providence in two, cutting off the city's western neighborhoods from downtown and its eastern neighborhoods.

Among the areas affected was Cathedral Square, which had been a bustling center of civic life before World War II. I-95, constructed adjacent to Cathedral Square, changed the area's character forever. A 1972 redesign by I. M. Pei attempted to revitalize the square but failed.

=== Pawtucket area ===
The people of Pawtucket feared the construction of I-95 as early as 1949. Editions of The Times and The Providence Journal in 1949 recall how neighbors in the Woodlawn section of Pawtucket feared the construction of the highway. According to Rhode Island Department of Transportation (RIDOT) blueprints, the highway was originally planned for the west side of Pawtucket, avoiding the Blackstone River. The highway was originally designed to be constructed east of the New York and New Haven Railroad tracks and create underpasses on Mineral Spring Avenue, Broad Street, and Dexter Street. The highway was meant to travel east of Pawtucket/Central Falls station and into South Attleboro, Massachusetts.

The Pawtucket River Bridge is part of I-95 and has been replaced.

== Future ==
In January 2024, the state of Rhode Island was rewarded an $81 million federal grant to construct the missing movements between I-95 and Route 4 in Warwick. A new I-95 South entrance ramp from Route 2 at the adjacent interchange will also be constructed.

== Exit list ==
RIDOT converted exit number from sequential to mileage-based numbering per federal highway standards. Exit renumbering began on August 28, 2022, and completed on November 3, 2022.

County	Location	mi	km	Old exit	New exit	Destinations	Notes
Washington	Hopkinton	0.0	0.0	0	0	I-95 south – New London, New York	Continuation into Connecticut
Washington	Hopkinton	0.7	1.1	1	1	Route 3 – Hopkinton, Westerly	
Washington	Hopkinton	4.5	7.2	2	4	Hopkinton, Hope Valley	Via Woodville Alton Road
Washington	Richmond	6.4	10.3	Rest area and welcome center (northbound)			
Washington	Richmond	7.3	11.7	3	7	Route 138 – South Kingstown, Wyoming	
Washington	Richmond	9.0	14.5	4	9	Route 3 to Route 165 – Arcadia, Exeter	Northbound exit and southbound entrance
Washington	Richmond	10.7	17.2	Parking area and weigh station			
Kent	West Greenwich	14.0	22.5	5	14S-N	Route 102 – North Kingstown, West Greenwich, Exeter	Signed as exits 14A (Route 102 south) and 14B (Route 102 north)
Kent	West Greenwich	18.2	29.3	6	18	Route 3 – Coventry, West Greenwich	
Kent	West Greenwich	19.9	32.0	6A	19	Hopkins Hill Road	Opened in 1983
Kent	West Greenwich	21.4	34.4	7	21	Coventry, West Warwick	Access via New London Turnpike
Kent	Warwick	23.9	38.5	8	24S-N	Route 2 to Route 4 – East Greenwich, West Warwick	No northbound entrance; signed as exits 24A (RI 2 south) and 24B (RI 2 north) northbound
Kent	Warwick	24.8	39.9	9	24S	Route 4 south – North Kingstown	Southbound left exit and northbound entrance; northern terminus of Route 4; future full interchange
Kent	Warwick	26.9	43.3	10	26E-W	Route 117 – West Warwick, Warwick	Signed as exits 27A (RI 117 east) and 27B (RI 117 west) southbound
Kent	Warwick	27.6	44.4	11-12B	27	I-295 north – Woonsocket	Northbound left exit; no northbound entrance; southern terminus of I-295
Kent	Warwick	28.0	45.1	12A	28A (SB) 28 (NB)	Route 113 east to Route 5 – Warwick	
Kent	Warwick	28.5	45.9	12B	28B	Route 113 west to Route 2 – West Warwick	No northbound exit
Kent	Warwick	29.5	47.5	13	29	US 1 – T.F. Green Airport	Access via Airport Connector Road
Kent	Warwick	31.5– 31.7	50.7– 51.0	14	31E-W	Route 37 to US 1 / Route 2 – Warwick, Cranston	Signed as exits 31A (Route 37 east) and 31B (Route 37 west); exits 2A and 2B on Route 37
Kent	Warwick	31.9	51.3	15	32	Jefferson Boulevard	
Providence	Cranston	33.2	53.4	16	33	Route 10 north to Route 2 (Reservoir Avenue) – Cranston	Exits 1B and 1C on Route 10; signed as exits 33A (Route 10 north) and 33B (Route 10 south)
Providence	Cranston	33.8	54.4	16	33	US 1 (Elmwood Avenue) Route 10 south to Route 12 (Park Avenue)	Northbound exit only; signed as exit 33B No northbound exit access; signed as exit 33A southbound
Providence	Providence	34.2	55.0	17	34	US 1 (Elmwood Avenue)	Southbound exit only; other movements via Route 10
Providence	Providence	35.3	56.8	18	35	Thurbers Avenue to US 1A	
Providence	Providence	36.2	58.3	19-20	36A	I-195 east / US 6 east – East Providence, Cape Cod MA	Southern terminus of US 6 concurrency; western terminus of I-195
Providence	Providence	36.3	58.4	20 19	36B	Point Street Eddy Street	Northbound Signage Southbound Signage
Providence	Providence	37.0	59.5	21	37A	Broadway	Northbound exit only
Providence	Providence	37.5	60.4	21	37A	Atwells Avenue	Southbound exit and northbound entrance
Providence	Providence	37.2– 37.8	59.9– 60.8	22A	37B	Memorial Boulevard – Downtown Providence	Accessible from the Providence Viaduct
Providence	Providence	37.2– 37.8	59.9– 60.8	22B	37C	US 6 west / Route 10 south – Hartford, CT	Northern terminus of US 6 concurrency to the 6/10 connector, Accessible from the Providence Viaduct
Providence	Providence	37.2– 37.8	59.9– 60.8	22C	37D	Providence Place	Accessible from the Providence Viaduct
Providence	Providence	38.0	61.2	23	38	Route 146 north to US 44 / Route 7 / US 1 – Woonsocket, State Offices	Northbound signage; signed as exits 38A (Route 146) and 38B (US 44); southern terminus of Route 146
Providence	Providence	38.5	62.0	23	38	Charles Street (Route 246) to Route 146 north	Southbound signage
Providence	Providence	39.0	62.8	24	39A	Branch Avenue	
Providence	Providence	39.7	63.9	25	39B-C	Route 126 (North Main Street) to US 1 (Smithfield Avenue)	Signed as exits 39B (US 1) and 39C (Route 126) northbound
Providence	Pawtucket	40.6	65.3	26	40	Route 122 (Lonsdale Avenue / Main Street)	Northbound exit and southbound entrance
Providence	Pawtucket	41.4	66.6	27	41A (NB) 41 (SB)	US 1 / Route 15 – Pawtucket, North Providence	Southern terminus of US 1 concurrency; signed as exit 41 southbound
Providence	Pawtucket	41.8	67.3	28	41B	Route 114 (School Street)	No southbound exit
Providence	Pawtucket	42.4	68.2	29	42	US 1 (Broadway) / Cottage Street to Route 15 – Downtown Pawtucket	Northern terminus of US 1 concurrency; signed as exits 42A (US 1) and 42B (Cottage Street) northbound; Route 15 not signed northbound
Providence	Pawtucket	43.0	69.2	30	43	East Street / Roosevelt Avenue – Central Falls	
Providence	Pawtucket	43.3	69.7	31	44	I-95 north – Boston	Continuation into Massachusetts
1.000 mi = 1.609 km; 1.000 km = 0.621 mi: Concurrency terminus; Incomplete access

== Tolls ==
In 2016 Rhode Island passed the RhodeWorks Act which imposed tolls on tractor-trailers crossing 13 bridges in the state, including on I-95. High-speed toll gantries were installed at several locations along I-95 between 2018 and 2020. Toll rates at each point varied between $2.25 and $9.50, with a daily cap of $40 and a cap of $20 for trips between Connecticut and Massachusetts. In September 21, 2022 trial, a district court judge ruled that the tolls violated the interstate commerce clause and therefore must be halted. Rhode Island appealed to the United States Court of Appeals for the First Circuit who ruled in 2024 that tolling could resume, however the daily caps must be removed as they unfairly favored local trucking companies over out of state trucking companies. The state awarded a new tolling contract to Quarterhill in 2026 with an intent to resume truck tolls in 2027.

Interstate 95
Previous state: Connecticut	Rhode Island	Next state: Massachusetts
