= Claiborne Pell Newport Bridge =

Bridge in Rhode Island, United States

Newport Bridge
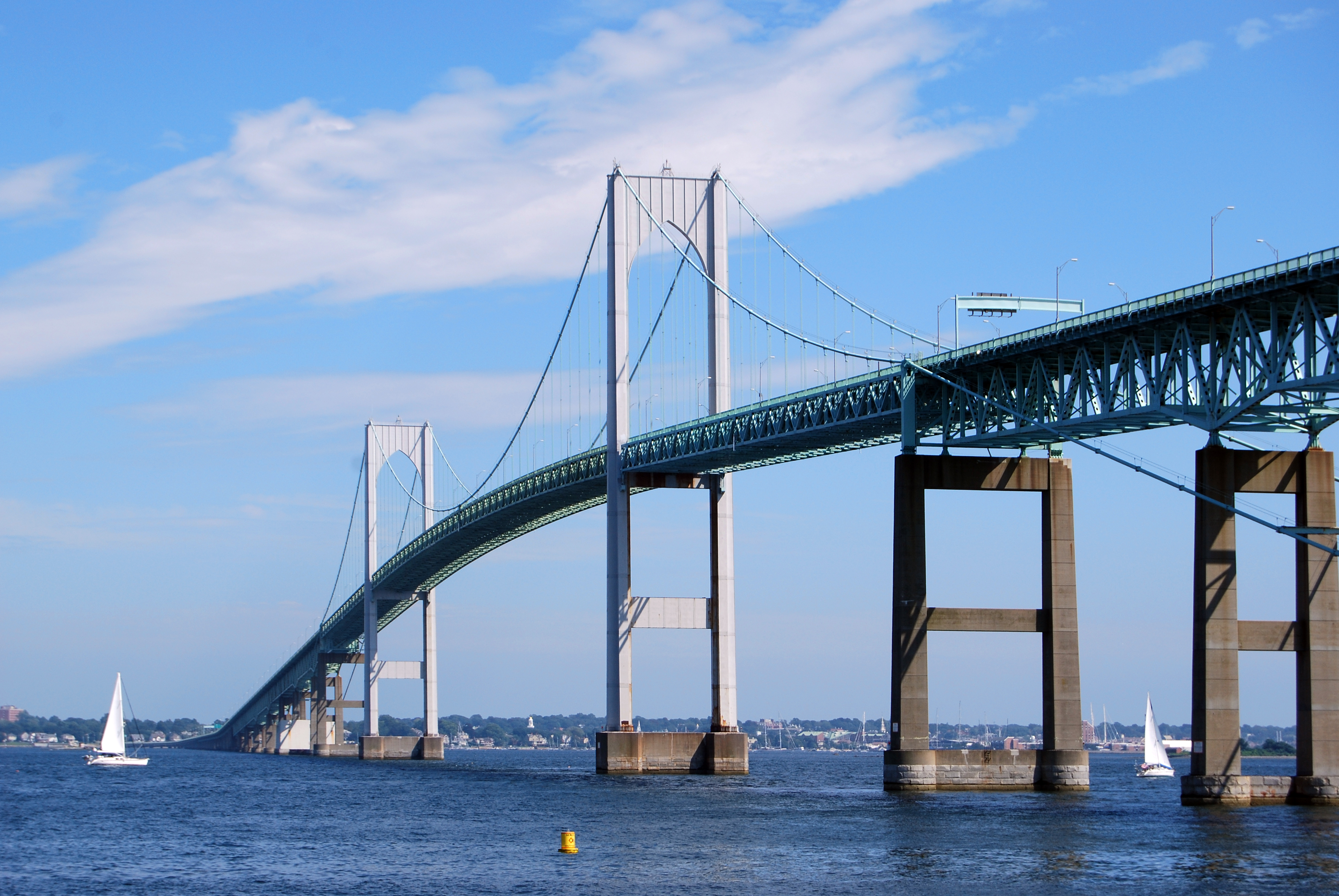
- Pell Bridge from the Jamestown side, 2009
- Coordinates: 41°30′10.28″N 71°20′21.76″W
- Carries: Four lanes of Route 138
- Crosses: Narragansett Bay
- Locale: Between Jamestown and Newport, Rhode Island
- Official name: Claiborne Pell Newport Bridge
- Maintained by: Rhode Island Turnpike and Bridge Authority

Characteristics
- Design: Suspension bridge with deck truss approaches
- Total length: 11,248 ft (3,428 m)
- Width: 48 ft (15 m)
- Height: 400 ft (120 m)
- Longest span: 1,600 ft (490 m)
- Clearance below: 206 ft (63 m) at mid-span

History
- Opened: June 28, 1969; 56 years ago

Statistics
- Daily traffic: 27,000
- Toll: Cars $6.00 per car both ways (without an E-Z Pass transponder)

Location
- Interactive map of Newport Bridge

The Claiborne Pell Bridge, commonly known as the Newport Bridge, is a suspension bridge operated by the Rhode Island Turnpike and Bridge Authority that spans the East Passage of the Narragansett Bay in Rhode Island. The bridge is part of RI 138. It connects the city of Newport on Aquidneck Island and the Town of Jamestown on Conanicut Island, and is named for Senator Claiborne Pell who lived in Newport. Route 138 is connected to the mainland by the Jamestown Verrazzano Bridge.

== Dimensions ==
The main span of the Newport Bridge is 488 metres (1,601 ft), making it the longest suspension bridge in New England. The overall length of the bridge is 3,428 meters (11,247 feet). Its main towers reach 122 meters (400 feet) above the water surface, and the roadway height reaches as high as 66 meters (217 feet). It is four lanes wide, two in each direction. On a clear day, the bridge's towers are visible from the observation plaza at the Gay Head Light in Aquinnah on the Massachusetts island of Martha's Vineyard, from the upper floors of skyscrapers in Providence (approximately 22 miles), and as far northwest as the parking lot of Stone Hill Marketplace in Johnston, RI (approximately 23 miles) and Interstate 295 south in Smithfield north of U.S. Route 44. The Providence skyline is likewise visible from the bridge deck.

== Tolls ==
The Claiborne Pell Newport Bridge is a toll bridge. As of 2026, the toll is $4 for cars with a non-resident EZ-Pass, and $6 for cars without an EZ-Pass. The toll for Rhode Island residents with an EZ-Pass is 83 cents.

The toll could be paid by cash or with tokens until 2009; tokens were purchased at the RIBTA office in Jamestown. E-ZPass was introduced as a toll payment in 2008, and the tokens were phased out soon after. The final day that tokens were accepted on the bridge was December 31, 2009.

Rhode Island residents with a Rhode Island E-ZPass pay a discounted toll of only 83 cents once they sign up for the RIR-RI Resident Discount Plan. Early in 2012, the Authority voted to raise tolls for passenger vehicles to $5, but this plan was abandoned on June 15, 2012, as Rhode Island lawmakers approved tolls on the newly built Sakonnet River Bridge in the future. The bridge also charges a fee equal to the toll for improperly mounted E-ZPass transponders that require a toll-booth operator to manually raise the gate. The bridge was the only toll road in Rhode Island until August 19, 2013, when the Authority began collecting tolls on the new Sakonnet River Bridge. However, toll collection on that bridge ended on June 20, 2014.

Cash tolling was discontinued on the bridge in October 2021 in favor of all-electronic tolling through EZ-Pass or bill-by-mail.

Bicycles and pedestrians are not permitted on this bridge, but some Rhode Island Public Transit Authority buses have bike racks for weekday and Saturday travel.

== History ==
The bridge was constructed from 1966 to 1969 at a cost of $54 million by the Parsons, Brinckerhoff, Quade & Douglas company. It opened on June 28, 1969, with ceremonies, celebrations, and fanfare.

Danish-registered oil tanker Gerd Maersk struck a support pier in February 1981. The incident caused no structural damage to the bridge.

The bridge was renamed for Senator Claiborne Pell in 1992, though it is still commonly referred to as the Newport Bridge by residents of nearby towns. It was featured on the Rhode Island state quarter in 2001.

=== 50th anniversary ===
In June 2019, a series of events were held to mark the 50th anniversary of the bridge. On June 28, a ribbon-cutting ceremony was held on the lawn of nearby Gurney's Newport Resort & Marina. In attendance were Senator Sheldon Whitehouse, Zechariah Chafee, son of the late Governor John Chafee, former Governor Donald Carcieri, Dallas Pell, daughter of late Senator Claiborne Pell, and Rep. David Cicilline. The ceremony included a U.S. Coast Guard flyover salute, a fireboat shooting water into the air, and two ribbon-cuttings. In addition, concerts were scheduled for Fort Adams State Park, along with cruises, fireworks, and other events. A documentary on the construction and history of the bridge, titled The Newport Bridge: A Rhode Island Icon, debuted on Rhode Island PBS on December 4.

=== Reconstruction of approach and onramps ===
The approach and access road to and from the bridge in Newport was initially intended to be part of a highway connecting to Rhode Island Route 24 in Portsmouth that was never completed. Instead, traffic from the bridge was unloaded at a stoplight on Admiral Kalbfus Highway facing the Newport Grand slot parlor. The onramp overpass for eastbound traffic coming off the Pell Bridge was locally dubbed the "Bridge to Nowhere" or "Highway to Nowhere". Plans to reconstruct and reconfigure the bridge access roads were made between 2001 and 2020. Ground was broken on the new onramp in July 2021. The new approach, which utilizes a former portion of Halsey Street, was opened in October 2022 for eastbound traffic. Traffic on and off the bridge began using the new connector roads in January 2023. A segment of JT Connell Highway that was bisected during the construction of the Newport Bridge was reconnected in March 2023, and provides a direct connection between the North End neighborhood and downtown Newport that had previously utilized the bridge ramps. The so-called "Bridge/Highway to Nowhere" overpass was demolished in April 2023.

== Impact on the region ==
The building of the bridge changed Conanicut Island's lifestyle and economy significantly. Before the bridge, Jamestown was a "summer-resident town" accessible only by ferry on the east passage side and the Jamestown Bridge from the mainland over the west passage, in which one-third of the residents owned summer homes. After the bridge it has become a more wealthy community whose residents now commute to jobs and opportunities in neighboring towns. At the same time, the island's local commerce became more dependent on tourism by visitors from off-island.

== Gallery ==
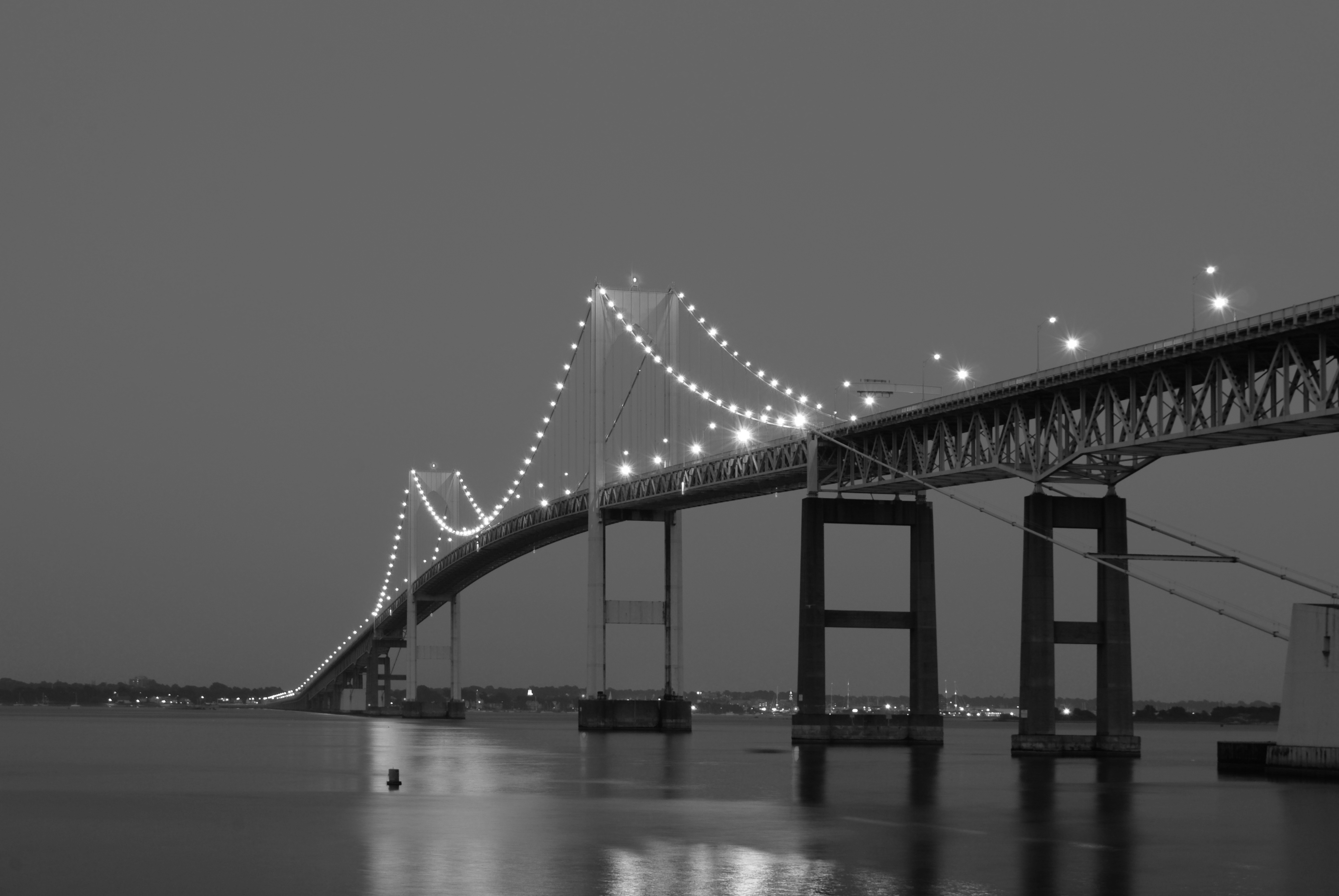
Bridge at twilight

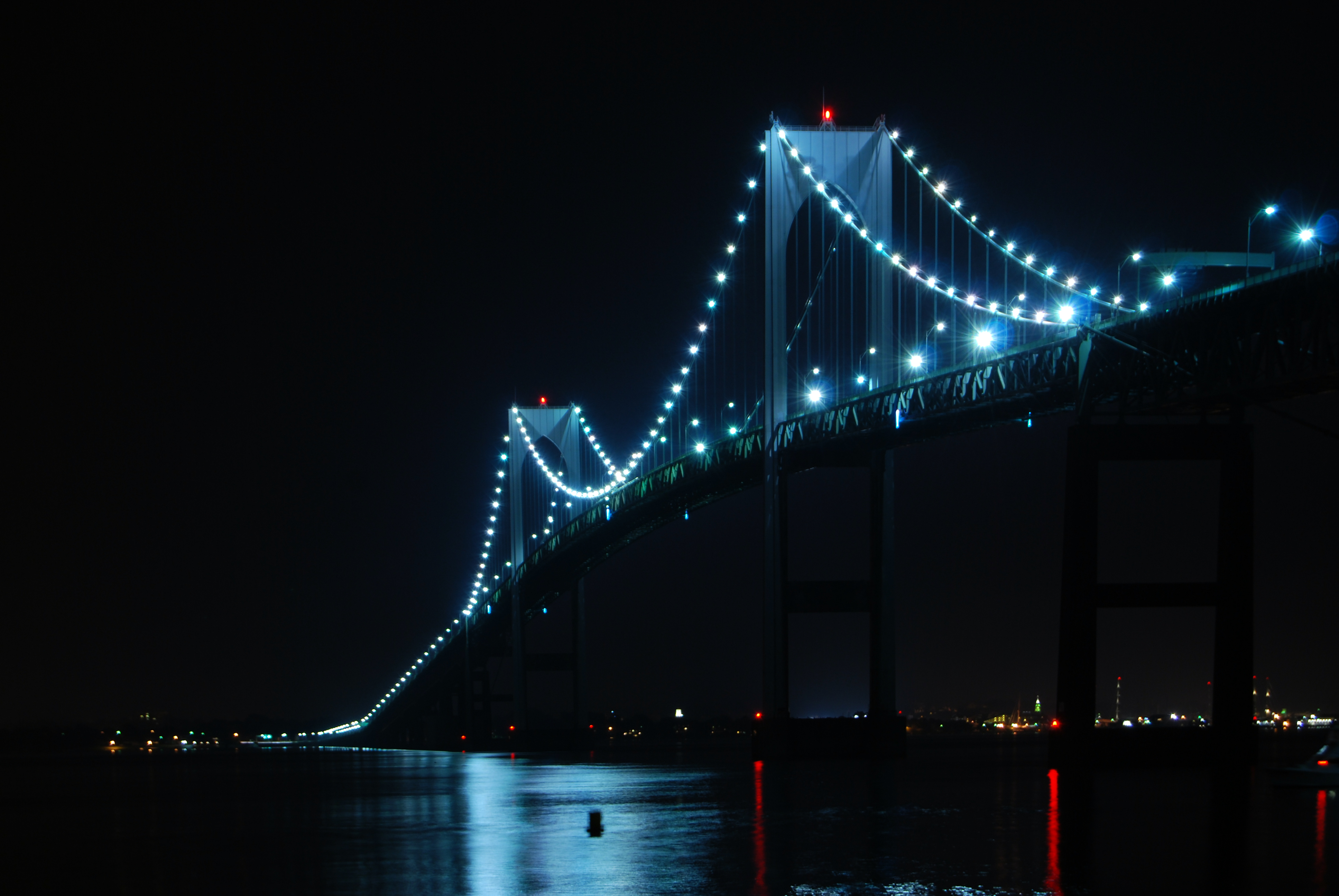
Bridge at night

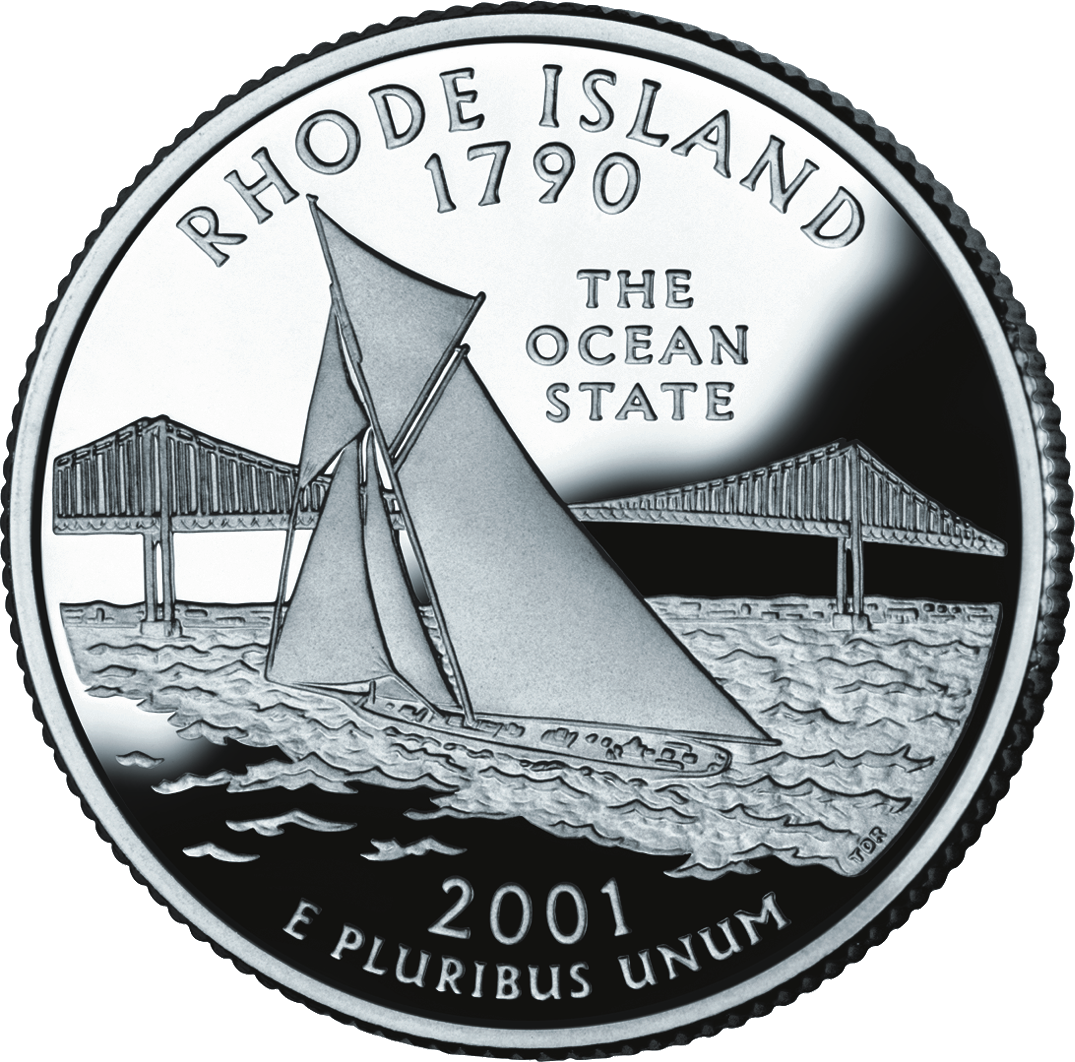
The bridge's representation on the state quarter

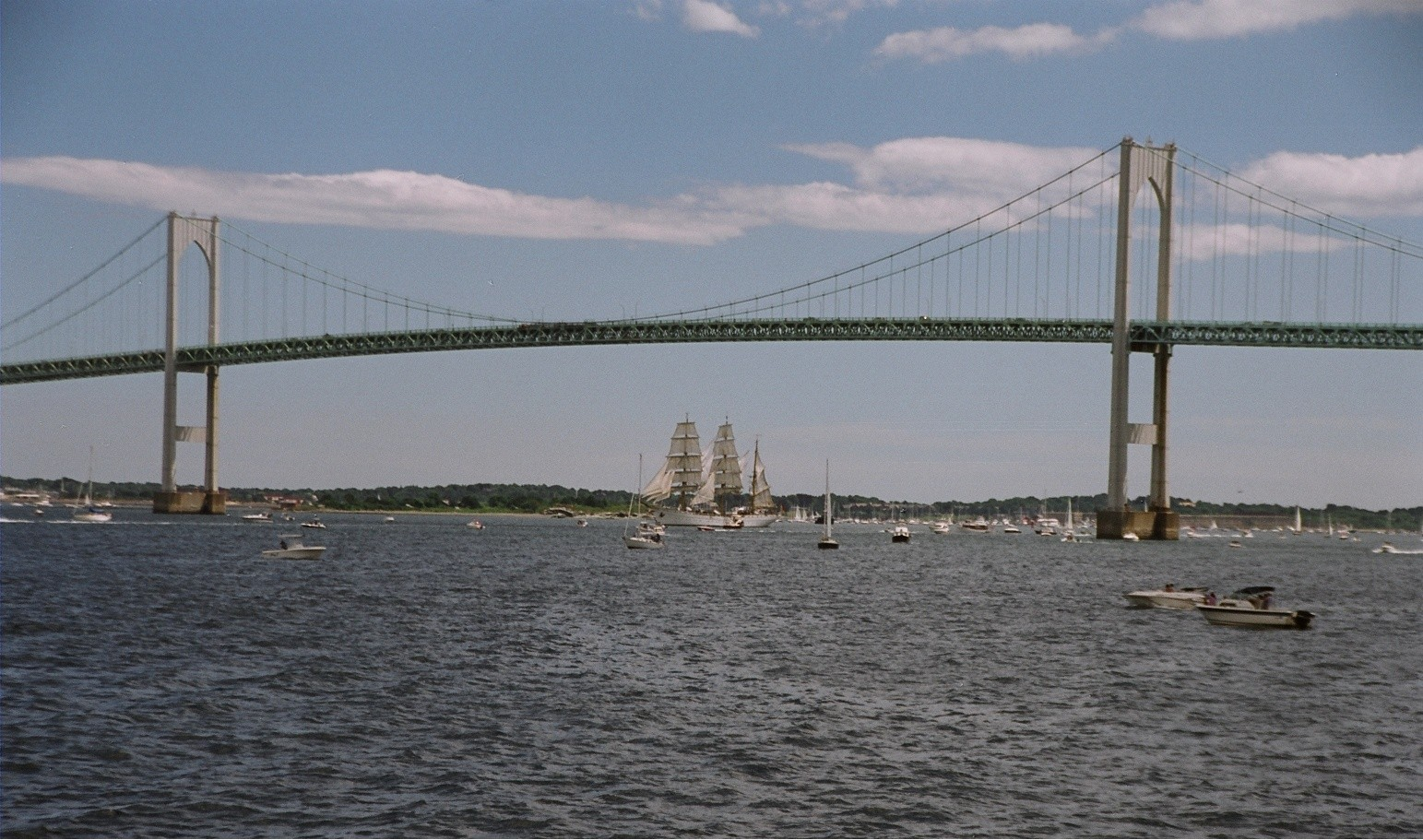
The bridge with a ship passing underneath the main span

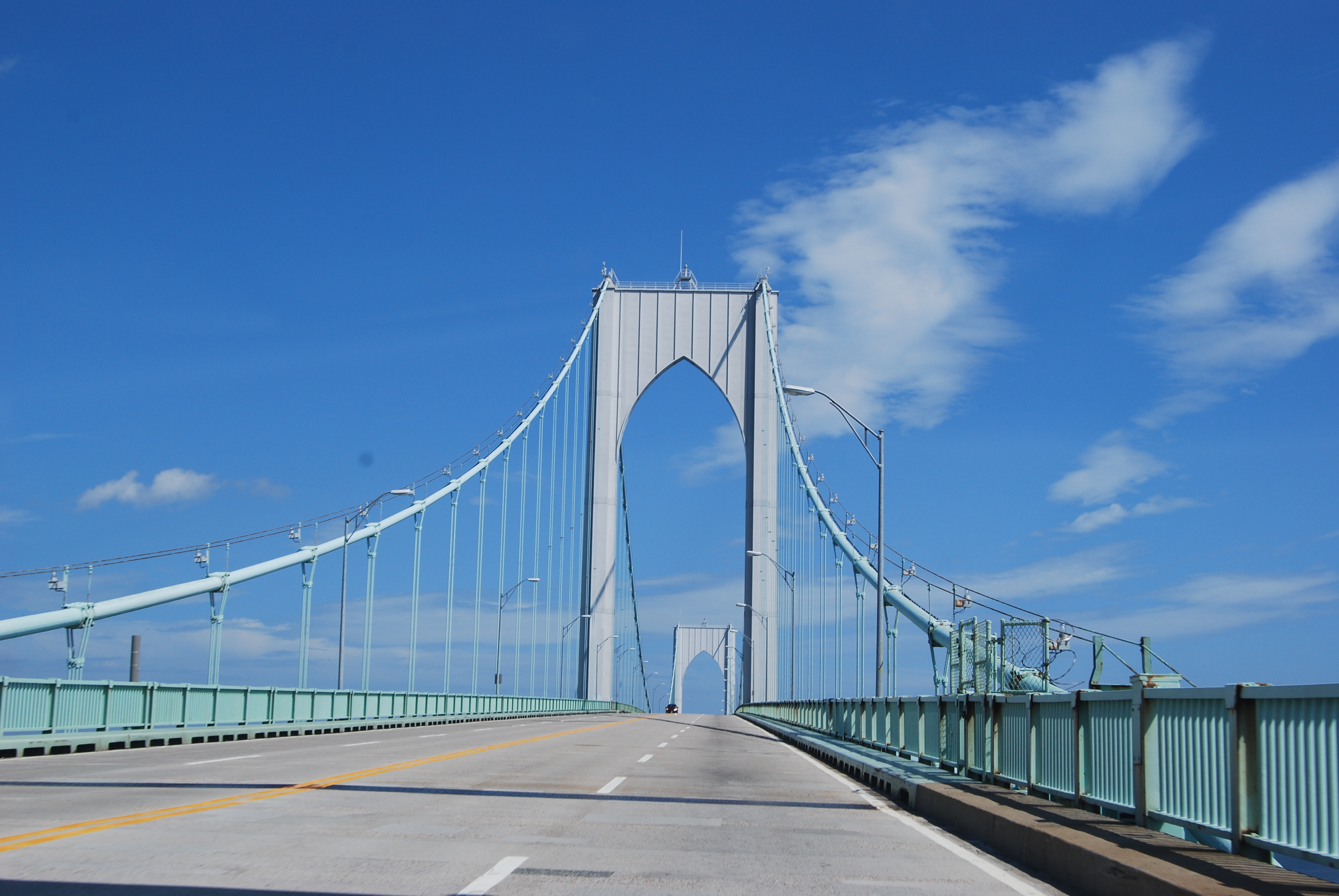
Crossing the bridge

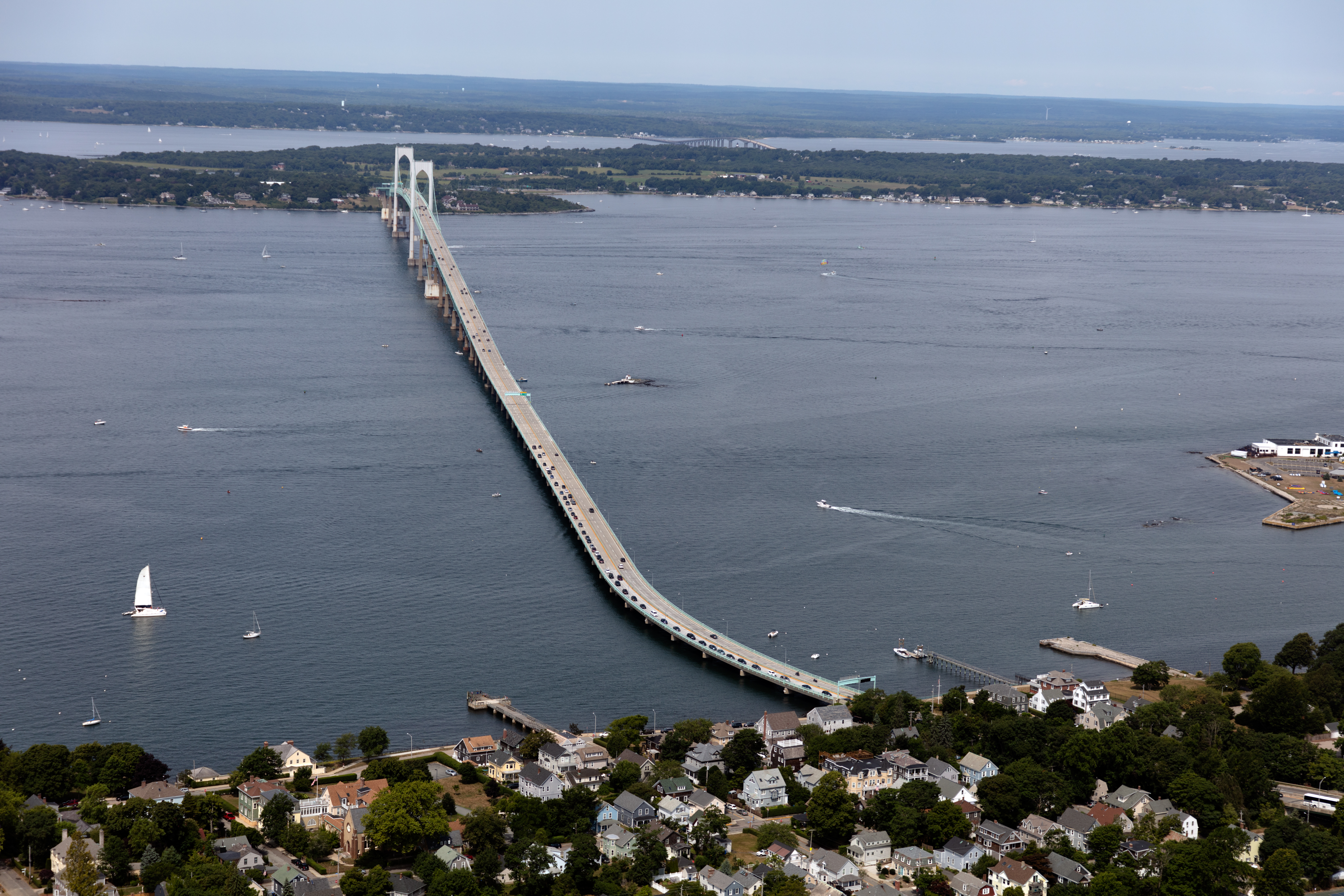
View of the bridge over Newport

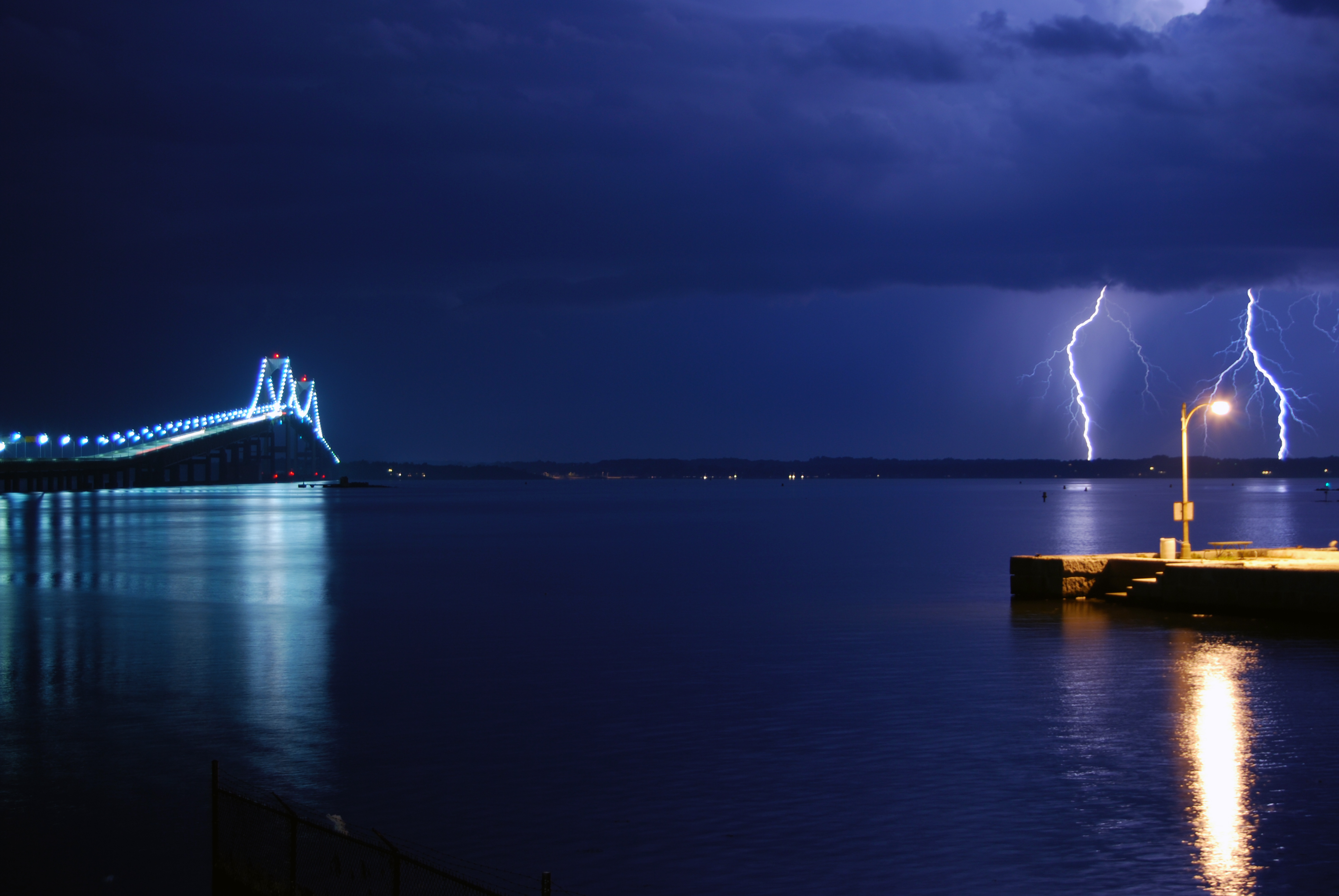
Bridge during a lightning storm

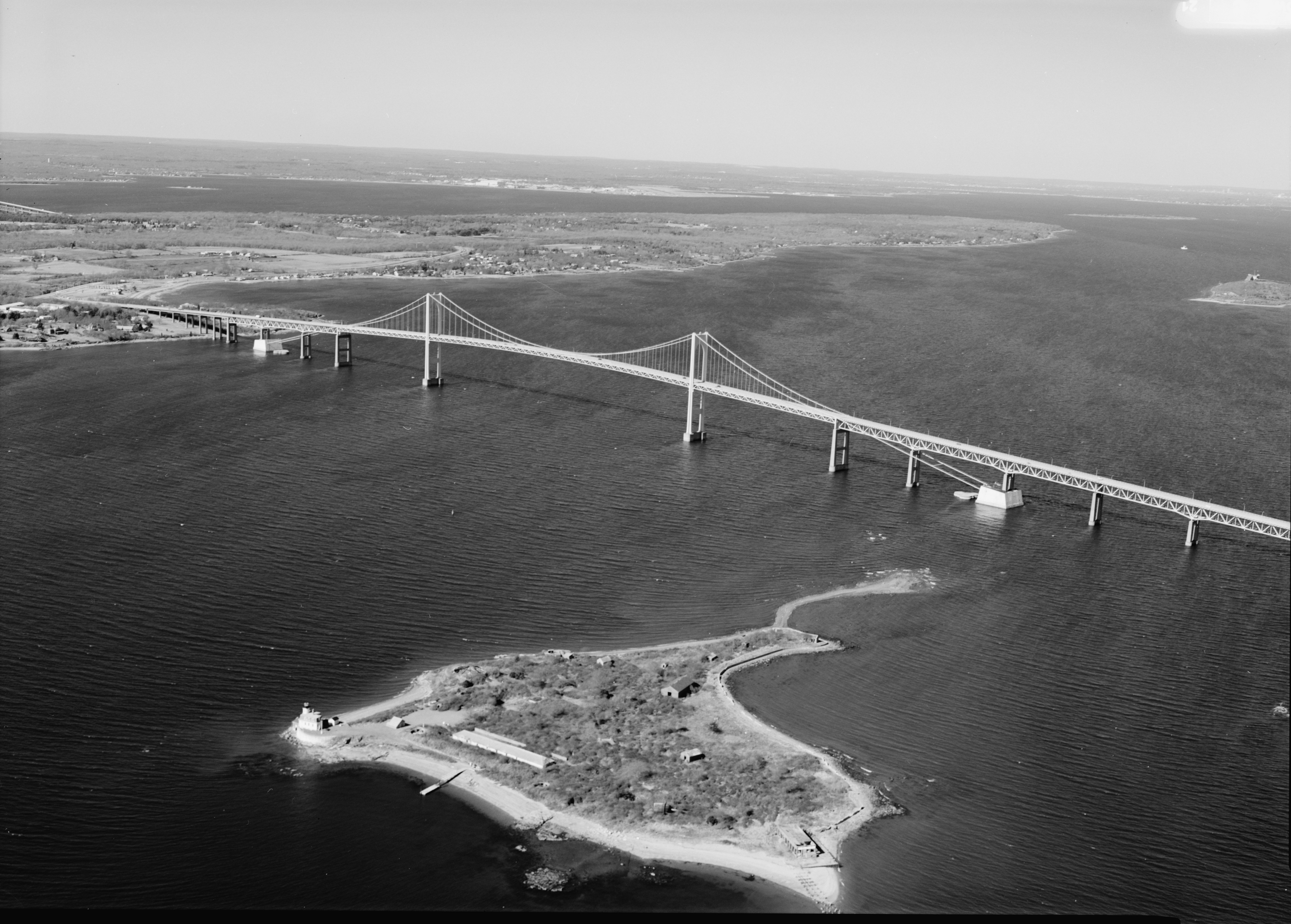
Aerial view of bridge and uninhabited Rose Island.

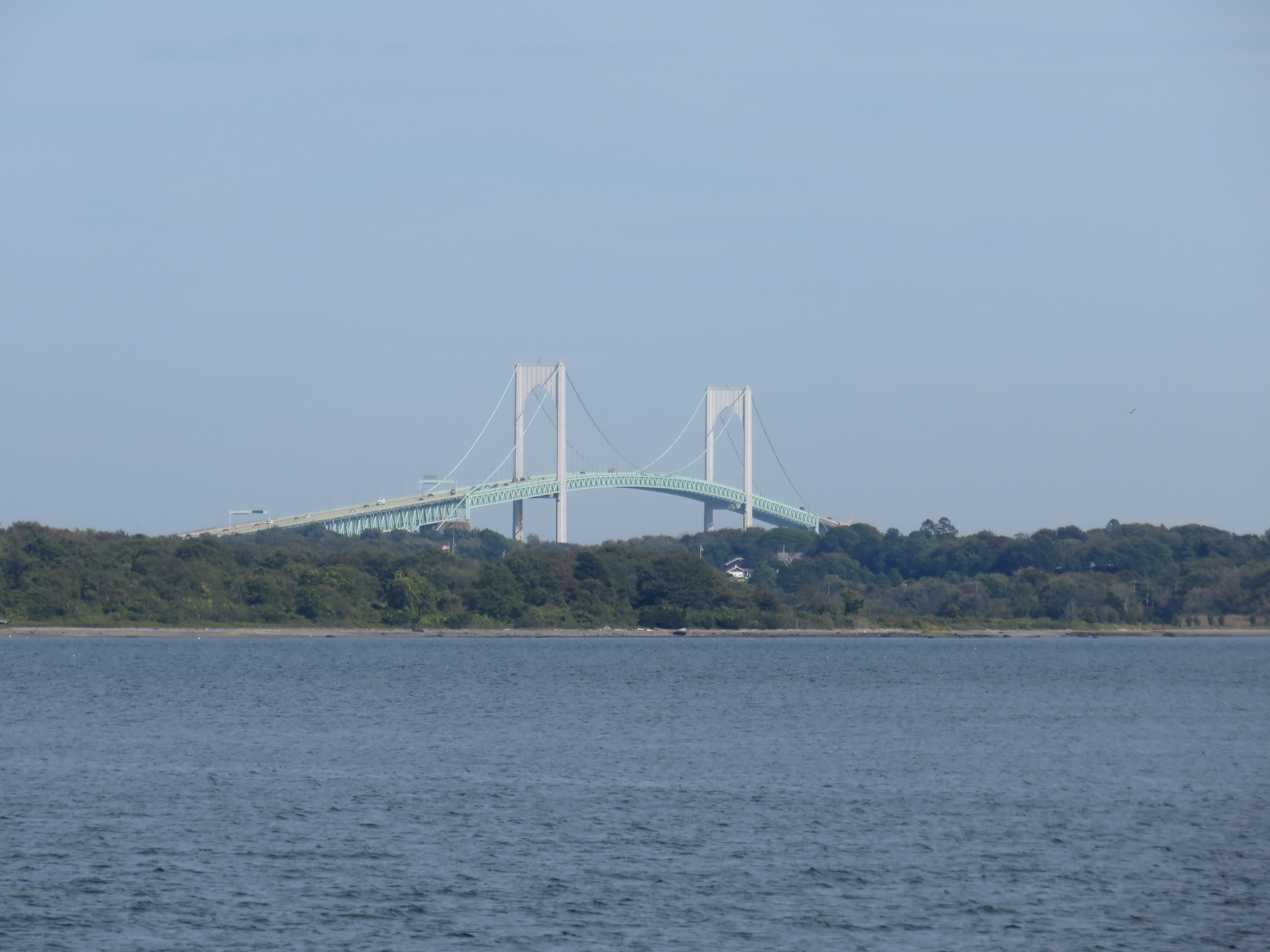
The bridge viewed from across Conanicut Island

== See also ==
- List of bridges in the United States by height
