= National Register of Historic Places listings in North Smithfield, Rhode Island =

This is a list of Registered Historic Places in North Smithfield, Rhode Island.

Contents: Counties in Rhode Island

Bristol | Kent | Newport | Providence (Pawtucket | Providence (city) | Woonsocket) | Washington

This National Park Service list is complete through NPS recent listings posted May 1, 2026.

	Name on the Register	Image	Date listed	Location	City or town	Description
1	Peleg Arnold Tavern	Peleg Arnold Tavern	July 30, 1974 (#74000046)	Woonsocket Hill Rd. 41°59′21″N 71°32′02″W	North Smithfield	
2	Blackstone Canal	Blackstone Canal	May 6, 1971 (#71000030)	From Steeple and Promenade Sts. in Providence to the Massachusetts border in North Smithfield; 41°55′16″N 71°25′21″W	Lincoln, Cumberland, Woonsocket, and North Smithfield	Initial listing extended from Providence, through Pawtucket, and as far north as Lincoln; a 1991 expansion (#91001536) extended it to the state line; the canal itself extended into Worcester County, Massachusetts, where it is the subject of separate listings.
3	Forestdale Mill Village Historic District	Forestdale Mill Village Historic District	June 5, 1972 (#72000041)	East and west along Main St. and north on Maple Ave. 41°59′51″N 71°33′50″W	North Smithfield	
4	Tyler Mowry House	Tyler Mowry House	August 16, 1996 (#96000904)	112 Sayles Hill Rd. 41°57′53″N 71°30′18″W	North Smithfield	
5	William Mowry House	William Mowry House	February 10, 1983 (#83000001)	Farnum Pike; 41°56′52″N 71°33′33″W	North Smithfield	
6	Slatersville Historic District	Slatersville Historic District	April 24, 1973 (#73000002)	Main, Green, Church, and School Sts. and Ridge Rd. 41°59′53″N 71°34′57″W	North Smithfield	
7	Smithfield Road Historic District	Smithfield Road Historic District	February 18, 1987 (#87000036)	Old Smithfield Rd., just north of Sayles Hill Road; 41°58′02″N 71°29′34″W	North Smithfield	
8	Three Dog Site, RI-151	Three Dog Site, RI-151	November 1, 1984 (#84000362)	Off Routes 5/104 near the Smithfield line	North Smithfield	
9	Todd Farm	Todd Farm	February 10, 1983 (#83000004)	670 Farnum Pike; 41°57′57″N 71°32′26″W	North Smithfield	
10	Union Village Historic District	Union Village Historic District	July 28, 1978 (#78000011)	West of Woonsocket on RI 146A; 41°59′28″N 71°32′13″W	North Smithfield	

== See also ==
- National Register of Historic Places listings in Providence County, Rhode Island
- List of National Historic Landmarks in Rhode Island
