= Mowry =

Mowry may refer to:

== People ==
- Mowry Baden (born 1936), American sculptor

=== Surname ===
- Daniel Mowry Jr. (1729–1806), American cooper and farmer
- George E. Mowry (1909–1984), American historian
- Jess Mowry (born 1960), American author
- Joe Mowry (1908–1994), American baseball player
- John L. Mowry (1905–1995), American politician from Iowa
- Larry Mowry (born 1936), American professional golfer
- Martha H. Mowry (1818–1899), American physician
- Richard Mowry (1748–1835), American farmer
- Ross Mowry (1882–1957), American politician from Iowa
- Sylvester Mowry (1833–1871), American politician, miner, land speculator
- Tahj Mowry (born 1987), American actor
- Tamera Mowry (born 1978), American actress
- Tia Mowry (born 1978), American actress
- William Augustus Mowry (1829–1917), American educator and writer

== Other uses ==
- Mowry, Arizona, a ghost town and the site of the Mowry massacres
- Mowry City, New Mexico, a ghost town
- Mowry Slough, San Francisco Bay
- William Mowry House, North Smithfield, Rhode Island

== See also ==
- Mowry House (disambiguation)
- Mowrystown, Ohio
- Mowery, a surname
