= Todd Farm (North Smithfield, Rhode Island) =

Historic house in Rhode Island, United States

- U.S. National Register of Historic Places
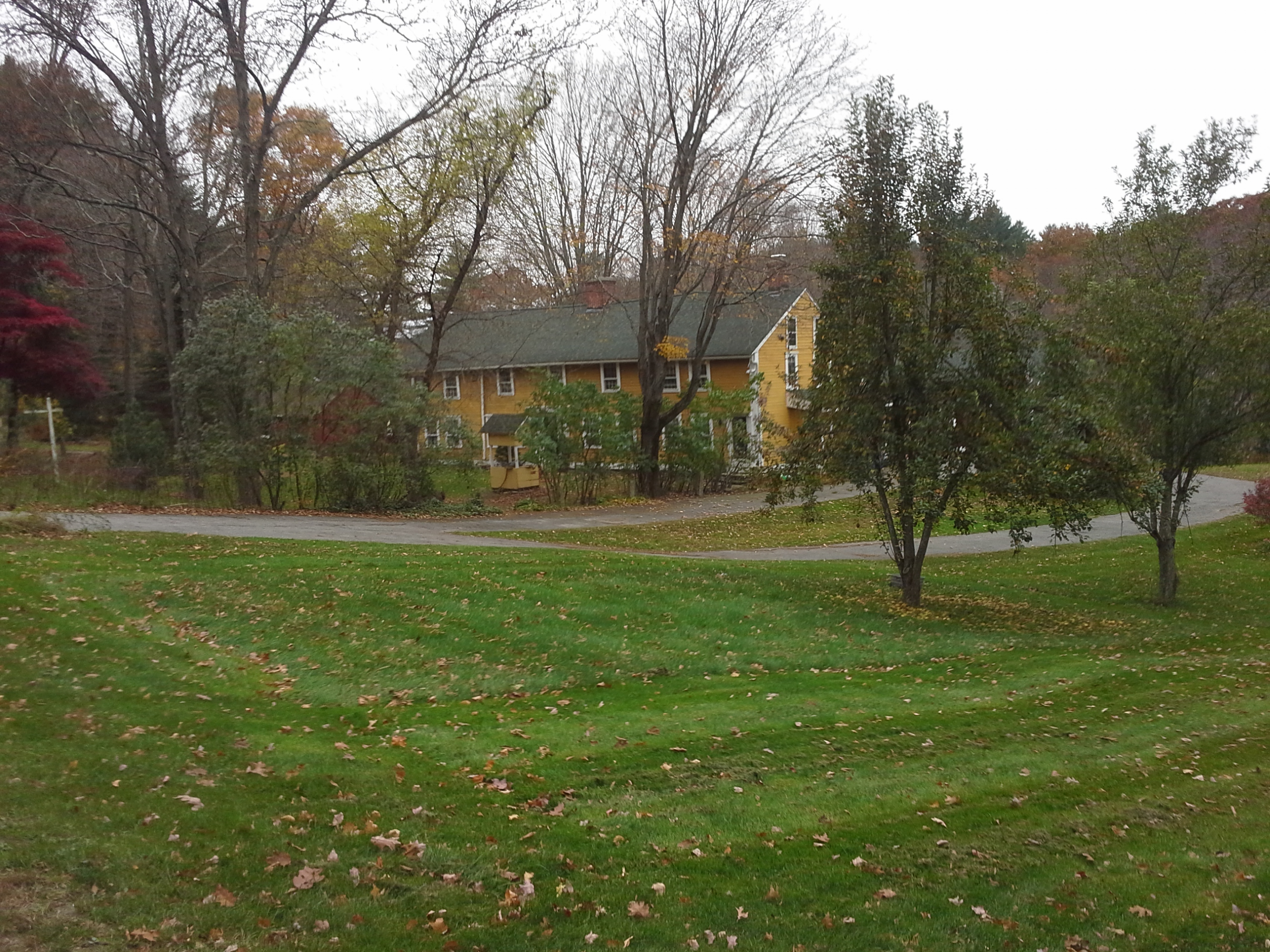

- Location within Rhode Island Location within the United States
- Location: North Smithfield, Rhode Island
- Coordinates: 41.96811°N 71.53636°W
- Area: 15 acres (6.1 ha)
- Built: 1740
- NRHP reference No.: 83000004
- Added to NRHP: February 10, 1983

The Todd Farm (also known as the Smith-Andrews-Taft-Todd Farm) is a historic farm at 670 Farnum Pike (Greenville Road) in North Smithfield, Rhode Island, US. The farm includes a house dating to 1740, as well as a collection of outbuildings dating to the early 20th century. The main block of the house is a 2 1/2-story wood-frame structure, five bays wide, with a gable roof and a large central chimney. The main block has been added to numerous times, with full-size additions to both sides as well as a sloping addition to the rear, giving the house a saltbox appearance in the rear and a total width of 11 bays. Behind and beside the house are arrayed a number of small outbuildings, and a barn which has been converted into residential space. The house was probably built by Noah Smith around 1740, around the time he established a sawmill on Cherry Brook, which runs behind the house and is dammed to form Todd Pond.

The farm was listed on the National Register of Historic Places in 1983.

== See also ==
- National Register of Historic Places listings in North Smithfield, Rhode Island
