= Smithfield Friends Meeting House, Parsonage and Cemetery =

Historic church in Rhode Island, United States

- U.S. National Register of Historic Places
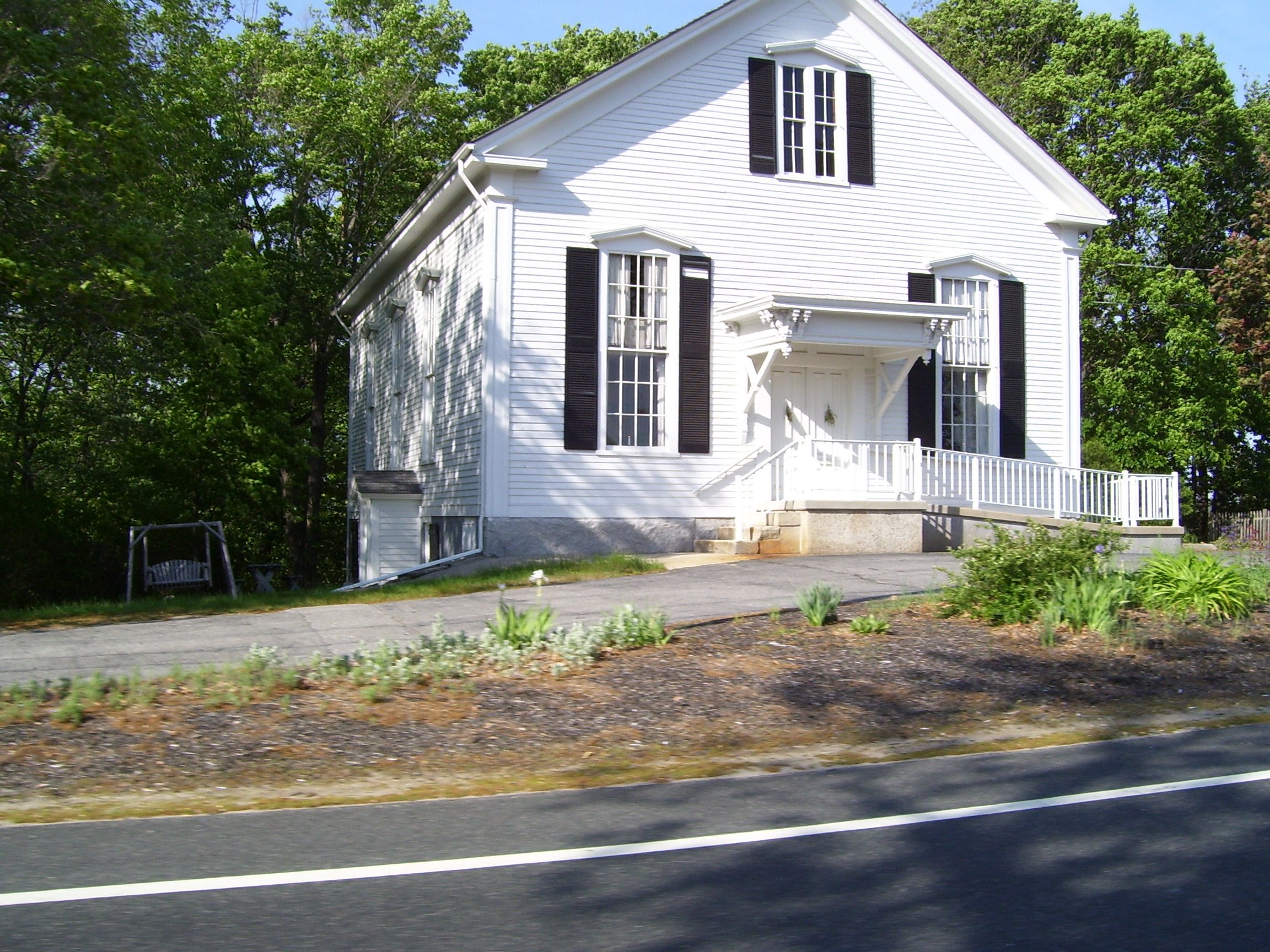
- Smithfield Friends Meeting House, Parsonage and Cemetery

- Location within Rhode Island Location within the United States
- Location: Woonsocket, Rhode Island
- Coordinates: 41°59′21″N 71°31′49″W
- Area: 2.5 acres (1.0 ha)
- Built: 1881 (Note: Rebuilt, original built in 1719)
- Architect: Fountain, John B.
- Architectural style: Greek Revival
- MPS: Woonsocket MRA
- NRHP reference No.: 82000008
- Added to NRHP: November 24, 1982

The Smithfield Friends Meeting House, Parsonage and Cemetery, is a Friends meeting house of the Religious Society of Friends (Quakers), rebuilt in 1881. It is located at 108 Smithfield Road (Route 146A) in Woonsocket, Rhode Island (across the street from North Smithfield). The meetinghouse is home to one of the oldest Quaker communities in the region.

Rhode Island provided a home to many Quaker refugees in the 17th century, and in the early 18th century a group of "Friends" started this congregation. Their original Meeting House, built in 1719, was connected to a chain of Quaker Meeting Houses that were built along Great Road (near Union Village and Smithfield Road Historic District). It was destroyed by fire in 1881 and replaced by the current structure, a simple wood-frame clapboarded structure with Greek Revival features.

The forested area directly to the north of the meeting house is a natural cemetery. Roughly 300 Friends from the 18th and 19th centuries are buried in this land, although only 100 Friends requested a gravestone or marker. The area is not treated with pesticide or mowed. A natural canopy of trees is allowed to grow over the cemetery. Quaker customs frowned on the use and erection of large gravestones or monuments. They also were "advised to avoid all extravagant expenses" with regard to the passing of a loved one. If the family simply had to have a gravestone, a simple one, no more than 15 inches in height above the ground, was allowed. The name, age and date of death of the deceased were all that were to be inscribed upon the stone.

In the early 19th century, Smithfield meeting struggled with the issue of abolition of slavery. Some Friends, notably Abby Kelley, may have been actively involved with the smuggling of slaves from Southern ports by ship to Providence, then through northern Rhode Island to Worcester, Massachusetts, and on to Canada. Other, quietist Friends believed in not breaking an earthly government's law.

Smithfield Friends Meeting became a Guerneyite (pastoral) meeting during New England's schism in the early 19th century. The New England schism ended in 1945. Smithfield continues to be a pastoral meeting, although the practice has become less common among New England Friends.

== See also ==
- National Register of Historic Places listings in Providence County, Rhode Island
