= Woonsocket Hill =

Hill in North Smithfield, Rhode Island

Coordinates: 41°58′39″N 71°33′13″W

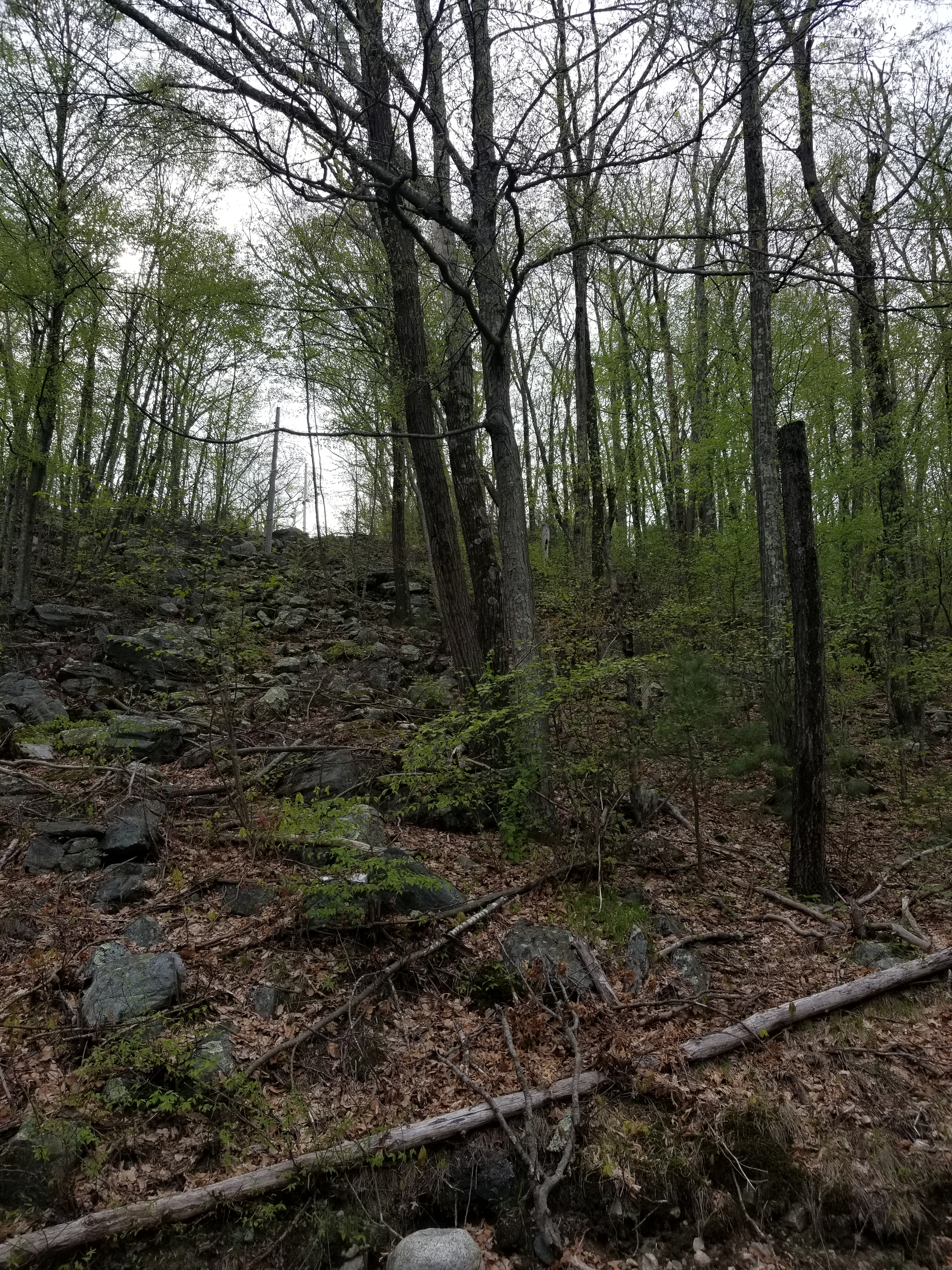
Woonsocket Hill as seen from Woonsocket Hill Road

Woonsocket Hill (originally Niswasocket) is one of the highest points in the state of Rhode Island and is the highest point in the town of North Smithfield, Rhode Island at 586 feet (179 m). The hill is located near the center of the town and "contained a highly refractory stone used for hearth stones. ".

== History ==
The hill takes its name from the Nipmuc word Niswasocket meaning ""place of steep descent" and is notable as:

[a] 586-foot hill in the center of town, with a fire tower at the summit. The hill, referred to in 1659 as "Niswasocket" by Roger Williams, was, until the turn of the 20th century, believed to be the highest elevation in Rhode Island. Although not the highest, it is one of the most dramatic because of its steep sides and height above the surrounding area. The summit affords long views in all directions; Mt. Wachusett, in northern Massachusetts, is visible from the top on clear days. A fire tower was established here in the early 20th century, and is still manned during dry periods. The rocks at Woonsocket Hill were a valuable natural resource in the 19th century. Because of their good refractory properties, they were used as hearth stones for furnaces in all the Atlantic states. In the latter part of the 19th century, the hill was frequented by numerous excursion parties. Nearby Union Village was once known as Woonsocket because of its proximity to the hill; the name of the hill was later applied to northern Rhode Island’s largest city.

Today, Jerimoth Hill is recognized as the highest point in Rhode Island. Various local landmarks take their name from Woonsocket Hill including, Woonsocket Hill Road, Woonsocket Hill Bridge, and the nearby City of Woonsocket, Rhode Island.
