= Mowry House =

Mowry House may refer to:

- William Mowry House, a house in North Smithfield, RI, listed on the NRHP in Rhode Island
- Tyler Mowry House, a house in North Smithfield, RI, listed on the NRHP in Rhode Island
- Roger Mowry Tavern, a demolished house in Providence, RI, listed on the NRHP in Rhode Island
