= Branch Village, Rhode Island =

Village in Rhode Island, United States

Coordinates: 41°59′55″N 71°32′55″W

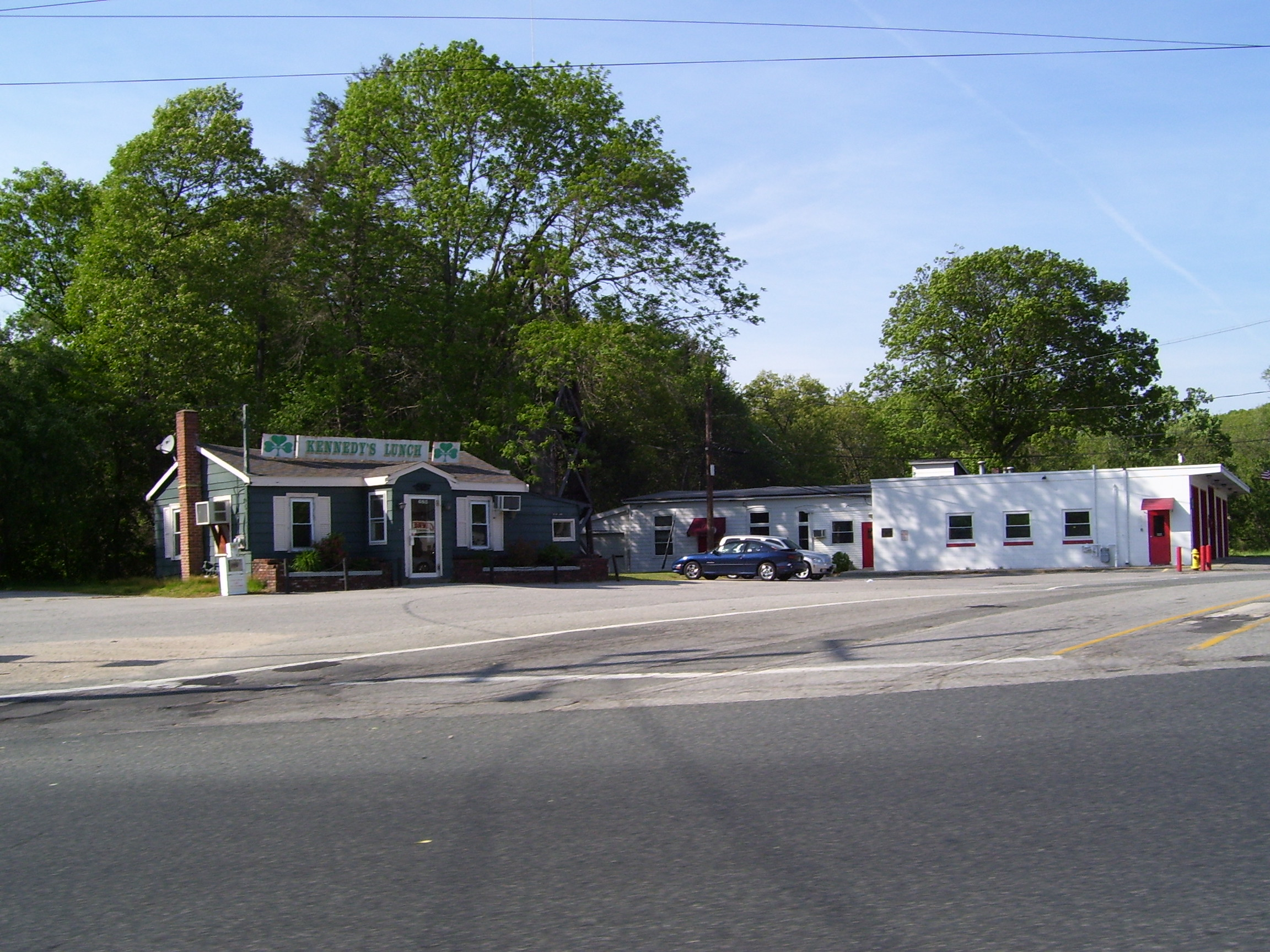
2008 picture of Branch Village featuring the fire station and Kennedy's Lunch

1920s picture of Branch Village featuring a former gas station and Kennedy's Lunch, an extant restaurant

Branch Village is a village in Providence County, Rhode Island, United States. Located on Rhode Island Route 146A ("Great Road") near the intersection of St. Paul Street in North Smithfield, the village takes its name from the Branch River which runs through it.

== History ==
In 1795 Elisha Bartlett of Glocester built a scythe and tool mill in Branch Village powered by the river. After his death in 1805, the mill was expanded to manufacture cotton. Branch Village is home to restaurants, supermarkets, a fire station with an adjoining fire lookout tower, and other businesses.
