= Emeline S. Burlingame =

American editor, evangelist, suffragist

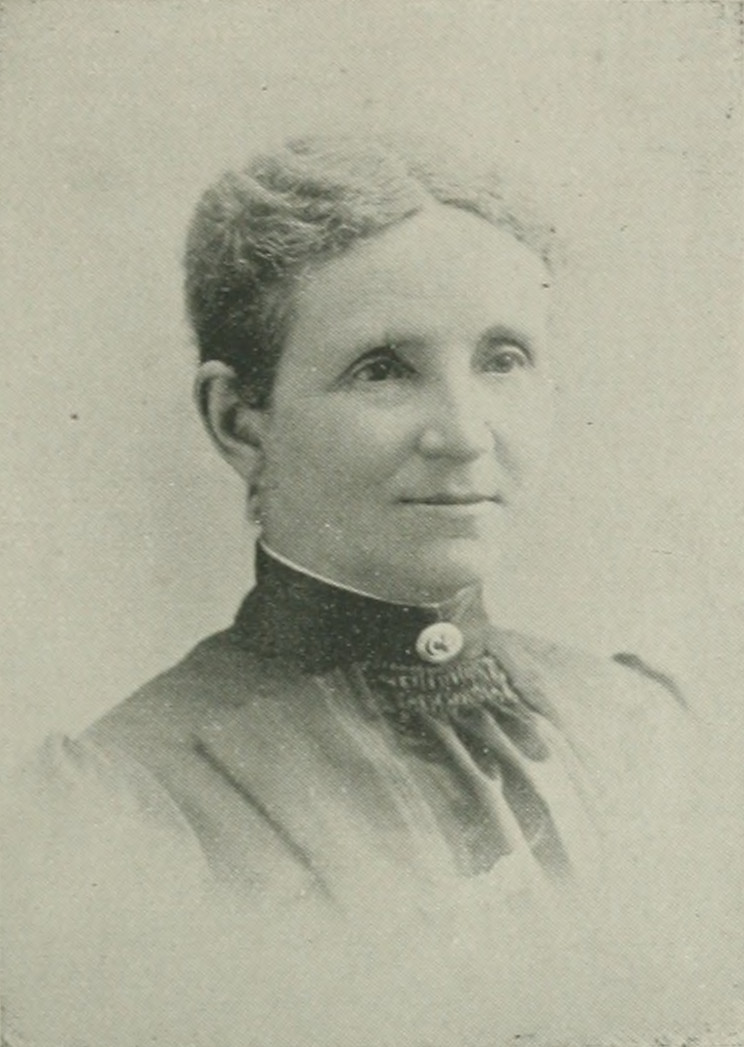
- Photo in A Woman of the Century
- Born: Emeline Stanley Aldrich; September 22, 1836; Smithfield, Rhode Island, U.S.
- Died: February 25, 1923 (aged 86); Providence, Rhode Island, U.S.
- Resting place: Swan Point Cemetery, Providence, Rhode Island
- Education: Rhode Island Normal School
- Occupations: editor, evangelist
- Spouse: Luther Rawson Burlingame (m. 1859; died 1890) Oren Burbank Cheney (m. 1892)
- Writing career
- Pen name: Aunt Stomly, Cousin Emeline
- Language: English
- Subjects: religion, temperance, suffrage

Emeline S. Burlingame (née, Aldrich; after first marriage, Burlingame, after second marriage, Cheney; pen names Aunt Stomly and Cousin Emeline; September 22, 1836 – February 25, 1923) was an American editor, evangelist and suffragist. She served for seven years as president of the Rhode Island Woman's Christian Temperance Union (WCTU), and was the first president of the Free Baptist Woman‘s Missionary Society (WMS or FBWMS). She was a licensed preacher, and was three times a delegate to the free baptist triennial conference. Burlingame held positions with several religious publications, including, for eight years, editor of the Missionary Helper for many years. She was a potent factor in securing Rhode Island State constitutional prohibition for 1884–1887. Considered a suffrage luminary, she authored the leaflet, “An Appeal to Women’s Missionary Societies Urging Church Women to Support Woman Suffrage as a Step Toward More Efficient Missionary Work,” which was printed and distributed by the National American Woman Suffrage Association among missionary societies.

== Early life and education ==
Emeline Stanley Aldrich was born in Union Village in what was then Smithfield, Rhode Island (now North Smithfield, Rhode Island) on September 22, 1836. Her parents were Wellington Aldrich and Celeste Angell Aldrich (1811–1885).

Her life until her marriage was spent in Providence, Rhode Island. She entered Providence High School at the age of 12, graduating at 15, when she began teaching, and earned enough money to enable her to take the Rhode Island Normal School (now Rhode Island College) course of one year. In school, she excelled in memory work, in composition and recitation. Her first trip out of her native state was made by carriage to Boston when she was 15. Two years later, she went by train to New York City

Before she was three years old, her mother began taking Burlingame to the Roger Williams Church; Sunday School and church in the morning and again to church in the afternoon. When 15, her Sunday school teacher asked her if she wasn't ready to become a Christian. She stated, “The thought at once came forcibly to me that I should never become a Christian in future time, it must be in some present moment.” She made the decision and was baptized in April, 1851, by Rev. Eli Noyes, returned from India, and pastor of the Roger Williams Church. She went on to say that, “The Roger Williams Church opened its doors to advocates of anti-slavery, temperance, and the broader life for women. Few churches of the other denominations did."

== Career ==
After completing her education, she taught for five years.

=== Dover, New Hampshire ===
On Thanksgiving Day, November 1859, she married Luther Rawson Burlingame, a Brown University man, class of 1857, from Pennsylvania. Mr. and Mrs. Burlingame lived for two years at Wellsboro, Pennsylvania, where Mr. Burlingame was principal of the Academy, six years at Whitesboro, New York, where Mr. Burlingame was Professor of Greek and Latin in the Free Baptist Seminary, and then seven years in Dover, New Hampshire. Mr. Burlingame became Publishing Agent in the Free Baptist Publishing Establishment. In Dover, she began her public career of writing and speaking. She contributed articles to the Morning Star, Little Star, and The Myrtle, becoming editor of the latter during the remainder of her stay in Dover.

In 1869, Dr. Dio Lewis gave the lecture in Dover that he would give again three years later in Hillsboro, Ohio, where it inspired the woman's temperance crusade and led to the organization of the WCTU. In Dover, a committee of women was appointed, meetings held and saloons visited. Burlingame was a member of this committee, presided at the great mass meetings held, and was offered the leadership of the movement, which she declined. “In June, 1873,” said Burlingame, “Mrs. M. M. H. Hills came to my house and told me I had been elected president of the Free Baptist WMS, just organized at the New Hampshire Yearly Meeting. I at once decided that if president in name, I would be in fact. It had been the custom for women's societies in the denomination to ask a minister to preside, read reports and conduct all public business. I arranged at the first meeting after my election for the women to do their own work. I well remember the first time I presided at the Anniversaries in 1873 at Farmington, N. H." The prominent men, Dr. O. B. Cheney, Rev. Ebenezer Knowlton, who had formerly conducted the exercises for the women, sat in the front pew, ready to grasp the helm should anything go wrong. Ascending the steps to the platform, Burlingame was too abashed to stand behind the pulpit, so she stood beside it. Other officers sustained their parts well. At the close of the exercises Rev. Knowlton came and congratulated her and said, "The brethren will have to look out for their laurels after this.”

While living in Dover, she served as editor of The Myrtle, under Dr. Day, and, at his request, contributed regularly to the Little Star, under the pseudonym, "Aunt Stomly", while in The Myrtle, for articles not editorial, her pen name was "Cousin Emeline". She was also a contributor to the Morning Star for several years.

=== Providence, Rhode Island ===
In 1874, on her removal to Providence, she assisted her husband in editing Town and Country, a temperance paper. She served as president of the Free Baptist WMS. from 1873 to 1886 when she was elected editor of the Missionary Helper, the organ of the society, introducing features which made it useful to missionary' workers.

In the fall of 1874, the General Conference met with Roger Williams Church. It was notable as the first General Conference at which a woman presided over the public meeting of the WMS.

In 1879, she was elected corresponding secretary and organizer for the Rhode Island WCTU, and began at once to address audiences and to organize unions in different parts of the State.

In 1884, she was elected president of the Rhode Island WCTU and devoted the next seven years to speaking and planning in its interest. Her addresses were given from pulpits of nearly all denominations, before religious conferences, legislative committees, Sunday schools, day schools, at camp meetings, and wherever the people could be reached. In the securing of a prohibitory amendment to the constitution of [Rhode Island, the WCTU was the acknowledged leader, and to that work Burlingame gave all her attention, continuing with equal vigor the struggle for the retention of the amendment when attacked by the combined powers of the liquor traffic.

As President of the WMS, she was asked to make the dedicatory address at Myrtle Hall, Storer College, May 30, 1879. For this she made her first journey alone, and, preceding the dedication, gave an evening of reading to defray the expenses of the journey. Rev. A. H. Morrell invited her to preach for him one Sunday morning. This she did, and thereafter, through the years, did considerable pulpit work. On moving to Providence, Burlingame became actively identified with the WCTU movement, then only a few months old; first with the Providence Union, then as corresponding secretary of the State Union, and in 1884–1890 as president of the latter. It was during her presidency that the campaign was on which won for a period of three years, 1886–89, State Constitutional Prohibition. Into this, she threw all of her energies, as she did in 1887 into the effort to secure state suffrage for women. Through all the years she has been keenly interested in these two reform movements, and has lived to see both realized nationwide. After giving up her state office in the W. C. T. U., she was appointed, through Miss Willard's influence, National Evangelist. This gave her credentials to speak for the cause wherever she might be. As a sample of her activities we quote, “For several years I had the work connected with the Presidency of the Rhode island WCTU, speaking once or more every Sunday, attending frequent conventions, keeping track of work at Headquarters and the interests of the local Unions, editing a semimonthly edition of the Outlook, and the monthly Missionary Helper.”

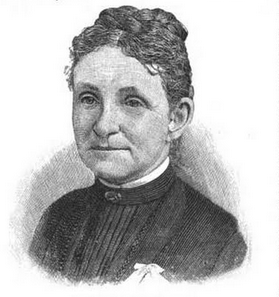
Emeline Burlingame (1889)

It was in 1886, that Burlingame resigned her position as President of the WMS. and January, 1887, became editor of the Missionary Helper. This position she filled for eight years, adding new departments to the magazine.

In 1889, she was a delegate to the General Conference from the Rhode Island Free Baptist Association, that being the first year when women were sent as delegates to that body.

In 1890, she was licensed to preach by the Rhode Island Free Baptist Ministers' Association. In the autumn of that year, at a meeting of the Board in Brooklyn, she was elected travelling agent for the WMS. For a year and a half Hillsdale, Michigan, became her home, traveling twice from Maine to Dakota, encouraging auxiliaries, organizing new ones, visiting yearly and quarterly meetings, preaching everywhere the Gospel of an “Applied Christianity.” At the General Conference held in Minneapolis in 1883, women were made members of the Executive committee of the Foreign Mission Society (F.M.S.). Burlingame was not only made a member but one of its vice-presidents. She continued a member until the F.M.S. was merged into the General Conference Board. About the time, the Methodists refused Frances Willard a seat in their General Conference, Free Baptists decided to grant women representation in their highest legislative body. Accordingly, several women were elected members of the General Conference which met at Harpers Ferry, West Virginia, in 1889. Burlingame was one of these and from that time until 1904, when she resigned because of change of residence, she was a member of each General Conference. The benevolent societies were consolidated in 1889 into the Conference Board. Burlingame was elected one of the seven women on this Board and continued until 1904. She was also vice-president of the Board, and presided over two of its sessions. "No work," she says, "that I have ever done is more important than this — the helping to plan and mold the affairs of a denomination." As a representative of the FBWMS, she was several times delegate to the National Council of Women.

=== Lewiston, Maine ===
Mr. Burlingame died in 1890. On July 5, 1892, she married Oren Burbank Cheney, resident of Bates College, and went to live in Lewiston, Maine. For many years, their interests had been identical in Christian and reformatory work. Both had lived very strenuous lives in devotion to such work. Both were “weary in the march of life” and the clasping of hands steadied and strengthened both. In Lewiston, Burlingame worked with the young women, leading them to formulate a self-governing platform of principles and rules. These “Principles" were printed and re-printed through the years and given to each woman student as she entered the college.

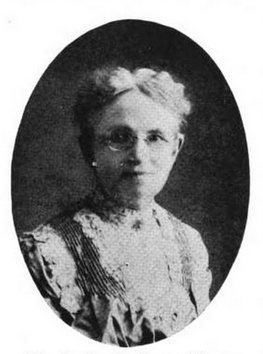
Emeline Cheney

At the National Council of Women's session at Washington, D.C., 1894, she was elected recording secretary, and in the following fall went to Atlanta, Georgia, to speak at a meeting of the Council in connection with the Exposition. In 1894, she resigned her position as editor of the Missionary Helper, to take effect at the end of that year. Serving for ten years as President of the National Free Baptist WMS, Burlingame became convinced that women as a disfranchised class were powerless to carry on efficient mission and reform work. She, therefore, printed a leaflet entitled, “An Appeal to Women’s Missionary Societies Urging Church Women to Support Woman Suffrage as a Step Toward More Efficient Missionary Work.” The National American Woman Suffrage Association printed and distributed several thousand of these leaflets among missionary societies in the churches.

== Personal life ==
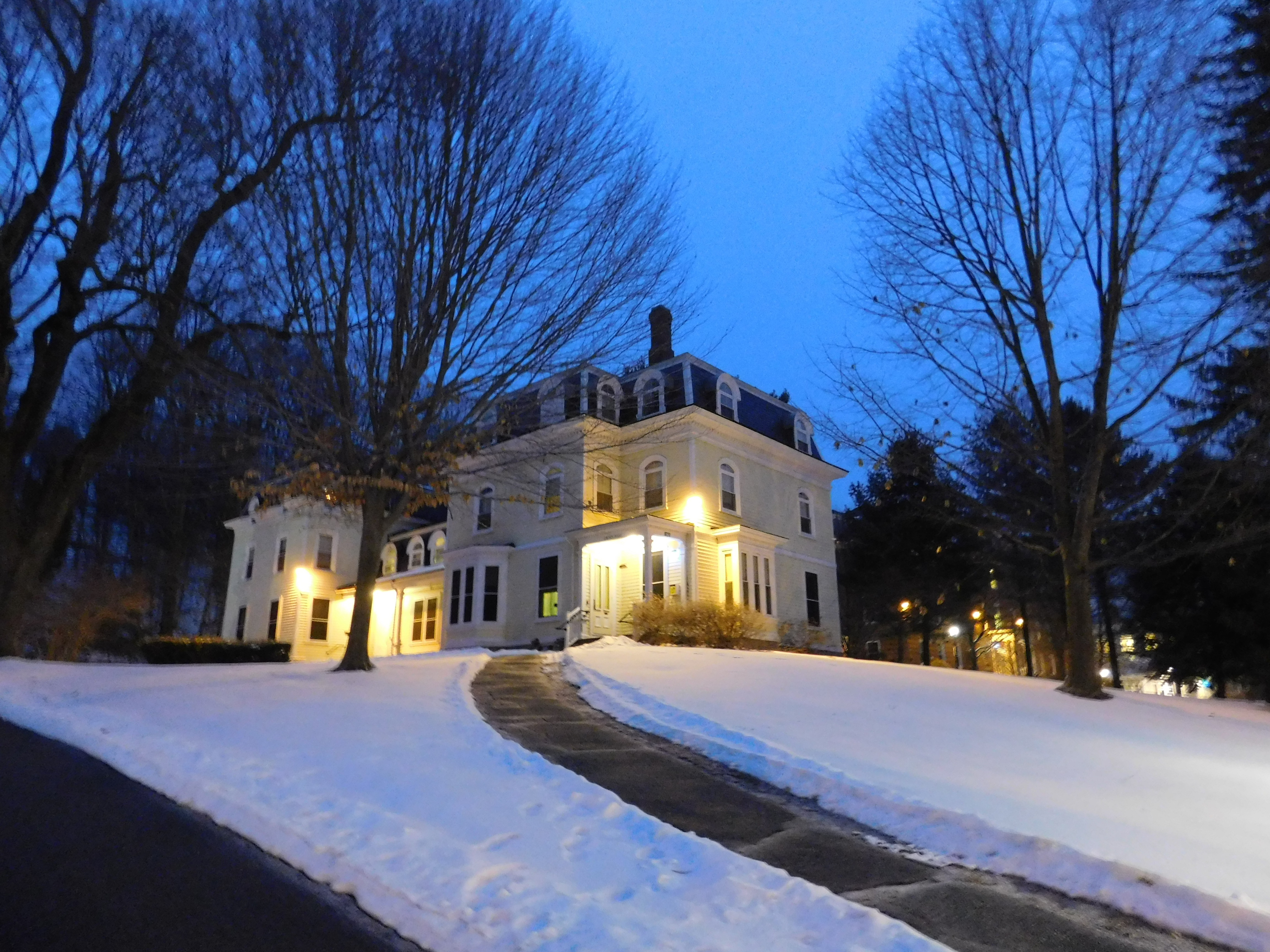
Cheney house at Bates College

She married Luther Rawson Burlingame on November 24, 1859. Five children were born to them, two surviving to adult life, Luther Day of Providence, Rhode Island, and Minnie Thomas of Arizona.

She married Rev. Oren Burbank Cheney, on July 5, 1892. In 1898, Dr. and Mrs. Cheney completed the Chautauqua Reading Course and graduated at the Chautauqua Assembly, at Ocean Park, Maine. After the death of Dr. Cheney in 1903, Burlingame Cheney made her home with her daughter. On her 70th birthday she expressed her feelings in a poem,— "I’m Seventy Years Old Today!" That year, while living in Hollywood, California, she wrote her husband's biography. At age 85, she occasionally appeared at a missionary or temperance function.

In 1918, she returned to Providence to make her home with her son. Emeline S. Burlingame died February 25, 1923, in Providence, and was buried at the city's Swan Point Cemetery.

== Selected works ==
- A birthday reverie. 1836-1906., 1906
- The story of the life and work of Oren B. Cheney, founder and first president of Bates college,, 1907
