= Quashaamit =

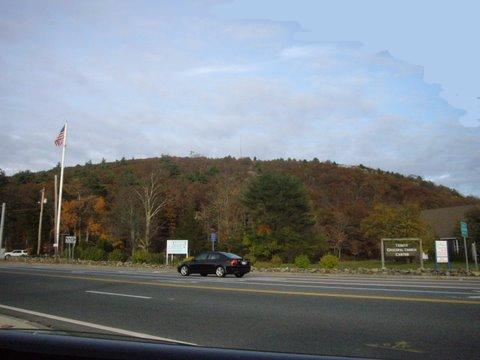
Quashaamit lived near Great Blue Hill in Massachusetts

Quashaamit (also known as William of Blewe Hills and William Minnian or William Awinian and Quashawannamut; prior to 1640—c. 1670/72) was a bilingual Praying Indian sachem or sub-sachem, and teaching minister. His tribal affiliation may have Nipmuc, Massachusett, and/or Wampanoag.

Quashaamit worked closely with Native leaders Massasoit, Metacomet, Wamsutta, and Wampatuck and deeded large tracts of land to early settlers in what is now Massachusetts and Rhode Island.

== Ministry career ==
Quashaamit lived near Great Blue Hill and was a resident of Ponkapoag, a Praying town, which was founded in 1657 after the Indians were removed from their traditional lands on the Neponset River near what is now the Neponset River Reservation. Quashaamit (William Awinian) served as an Indian preacher in Ponkapoag from 1656 until his death sometime between 1670 and 1672. Quashaamit was acquainted with Rev. John Eliot who translated the first Bible into a Native American language, and in 1662 Eliot helped Quashaamit and other Ponkapoag Indians deed land to settlers, in what is now Mendon, Massachusetts and Milford, Massachusetts and to reserve their traditional hunting and fishing rights in the area.

== Land disputes and transfers ==
In 1659, Quashaamit went to Providence to assert his right to land in what is now northern Rhode Island, and the town agreed to investigate his claim with the Indians in the area, and in 1661-62 his rights to northern Rhode Island were referenced in a deed by Alexander (Wamsutta), recorded in Providence. On "August 5, 1665, in a deed to the town of Braintree [(Quincy)] made by Wampatuck alias Josiah, Chief Sachem of the Massachusetts Indians, [w]ith the consent of his wise men, [Quashaamit] is called William Mananiomott in the body of the instrument, but his signature is William Manunion, and Joseph Manunion was a witness." In 1666 Quashaamit deeded land to Edward Inman and John Mowry in and around what is now North Smithfield, Rhode Island, and Quashaamit signed his name "William Minnian" which "suggests, the English were well established in the region." Inman purchased further land from William Minnian in 1669 which was also confirmed by King Philip (Metacomet) who also refers to William's uncle, Jeffrey, but the deeds were disputed by the town of Providence for several years thereafter because the town already claimed exclusive possession of those lands as previously granted by Canonicus.

== Later life ==
Daniel Gookin wrote in 1674 that "William Awinian...was a knowing person, and of great ability, and of genteel deportment, and spoke very good English. His death was a very great rebuke to this place," and he was "a very able teacher who died about three years since." Upon his death John Eliot stated that "Their late Teacher, William, is deceased; He was a man of eminent parts; all the English acknowledge him, and he was known to many. He was of ready wit, sound judgment, and affable. He has gone into the Lord."
