= Peleg Arnold =

American judge

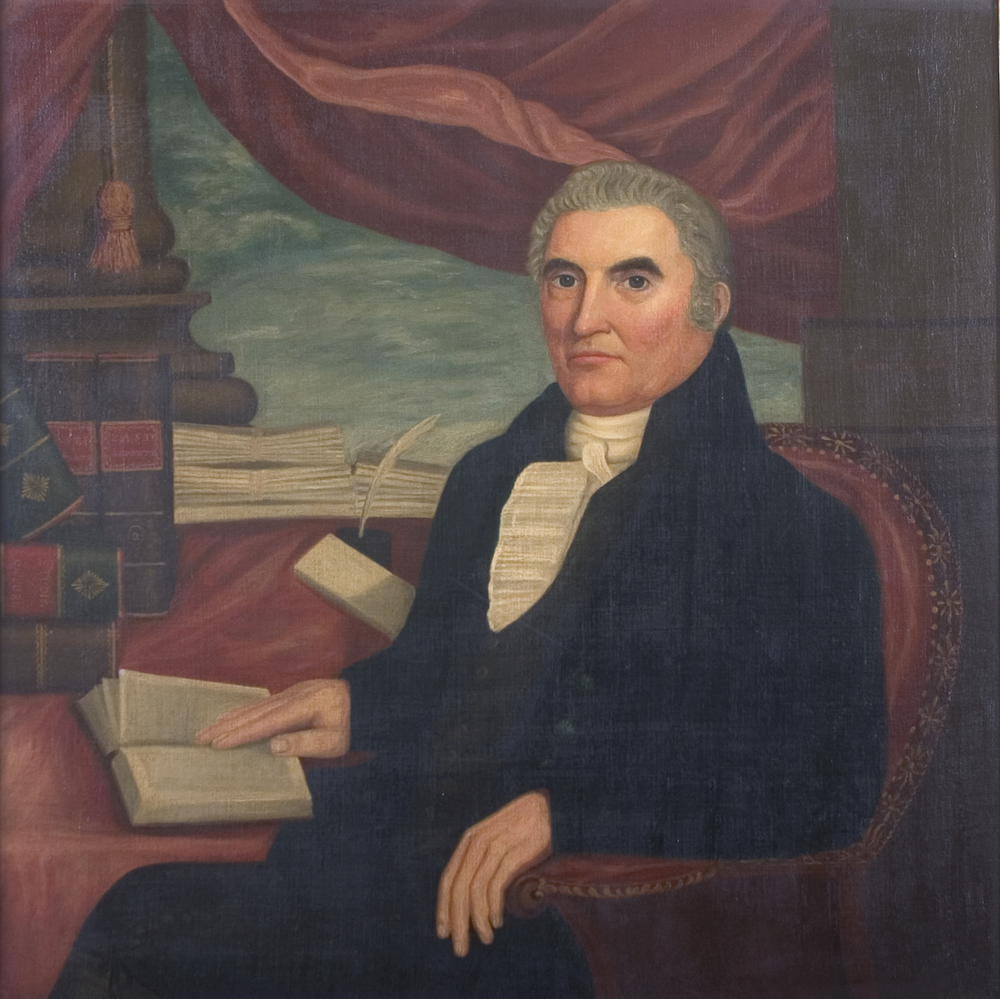

27th and 29th Chief Justice of the Rhode Island Supreme Court
- In office June 1795 – June 1809
- Preceded by: Daniel Owen
- Succeeded by: Thomas Arnold
- In office 1810–1812
- Preceded by: Thomas Arnold
- Succeeded by: Daniel Lyman

Personal details
- Born: June 10, 1751 Smithfield, Rhode Island
- Died: 1820 (aged 68–69)
- Parent(s): Thomas Arnold and Patience Cook
- Education: Brown University
- Occupation: Lawyer, tavernkeeper, chief justice

Peleg Arnold (1751–1820) was a lawyer, tavern-keeper, jurist, and statesman from Smithfield, Rhode Island (now North Smithfield). He represented Rhode Island as a delegate to the Continental Congress in the 1787–1788 session. He later served as the chief justice of the Rhode Island Supreme Court from June 1795 to June 1809, and from May 1810 to May 1812.

== Personal life ==
Arnold was born on June 10, 1751, at Smithfield (now North Smithfield), the ninth of the fifteen children of Thomas Arnold. His mother was Patience Cook of Newport who was Thomas' third wife. After starting in the common schools, he graduated from Brown University in Providence. Like many of his generation he prospered in a number of careers at the same time, and combined these with a government service and civic efforts.

Peleg Arnold House off Great Road in North Smithfield, pictured in 1902, American Revolution headquarters in North Smithfield

Arnold read law, was admitted to the bar and practiced at Smithfield. He opened and kept the Peleg Arnold Tavern, which still stands at 4 Woonsocket Hill Road in North Smithfield, Rhode Island.

Arnold built his home in Union Village, which is now part of North Smithfield. During the Revolutionary War he was the colonel of the 2nd regiment of the Providence County Militia.

When the need for additional troops led to the re-formation of the 1st Rhode Island regiment of the Continental Line in 1778, Arnold was one of the proponents for the idea of using a bounty and freedom to encourage the enlistment of blacks. He continued this interest after the war when in 1790 he founded the Providence Society for the Abolition of Slavery.

Arnold's concern for his community is also evidenced by the creation of the Smithfield Union Bank in 1803. He was the bank's first President, and it first conducted business from his home in Union. beginning in 1810, he served as president of a local preparatory school, the Smithfield Academy. Arnold died at Smithfield on February 13, 1820, and is buried in the Union Cemetery in today's North Smithfield. According to one source, "[t]owards the close of his life Judge Peleg was widely known, not only as an extensive dealer in, but an ardent lover of, New England Rum."

== Political career ==
Arnold was first elected to Rhode Island's governing body, the General Assembly in 1777. He would serve again from May 1782 to 1783. He was appointed as a Rhode Island delegate to the Confederation Congress in 1787. A strong supporter of the 1787 Constitutional Convention, in 1788 he left the congress to return home and address the ratification of the United States Constitution. He served briefly as Deputy Governor of Rhode Island in 1790.

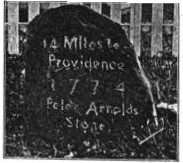
Peleg Arnold's 1774 milestone on old Great Road in Union Village across from the Friends Meetinghouse

Arnold made two unsuccessful attempts to win a seat in the United States House of Representatives. In the election of 1794, he ran against the incumbent Benjamin Bourne as an Anti-Federalist (Country Party) candidate. When Bourne resigned in 1796, he ran in the special election to finish the incomplete term, this time as a member of the Republican Party, and lost to Elisha Reynolds Potter.

In 1795 Arnold was named the chief justice of Rhode Island's Superior Court of Judicature, Court of Assize and General Gaol Delivery. The name of this court was changed in 1798 to the simpler "The Supreme Judicial Court". The Assembly re-appointed him annually every year until June 1809. After a year off due to illness, they appointed him again from 1810 to 1812. Arnold served again in the General Assembly from 1817 to 1819. He was twice a candidate for governor, one of two major Democratic-Republican candidates in the 1806 election and their nominee in the 1815 election.

== See also ==
- Peleg Arnold House

Party political offices
First	Democratic-Republican Party nominee for Governor of Rhode Island; 1806	Succeeded by James Fenner
Vacant Title last held by James Fenner	Democratic-Republican Party nominee for Governor of Rhode Island; 1815	Succeeded by Nehemiah R. Knight
