= Mowery =

Mowery is a surname. Notable people with the surname include:

- David C. Mowery, American economist
- Edward J. Mowery (1906–1970), American journalist
- Harold Mowery (1930–2014), American politician

== See also ==
- Mowry (disambiguation)
