= Three Dog Site, RI-151 =

- U.S. National Register of Historic Places
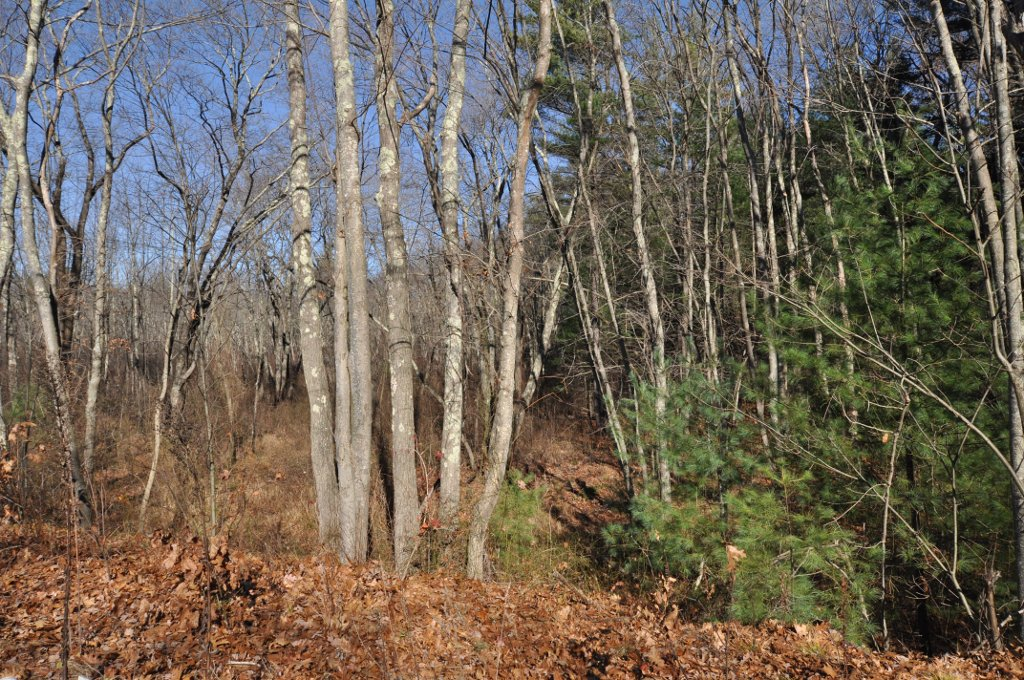
- Area near where the site is located in North Smithfield
- Location: North Smithfield, Rhode Island
- NRHP reference No.: 84000362
- Added to NRHP: November 1, 1984

Three Dog Site, RI-151 is an archaeological site in North Smithfield, Rhode Island, United States.

The site features Late Archaic and prehistoric archeological evidence and was added to the National Historic Register in 1984.
