= Rhode Island Route 104 =

State highway in Rhode Island, US

Route 104
- Route 104 highlighted in red

Route information
- Maintained by RIDOT
- Length: 13.4 mi (21.6 km)
- Existed: 1923–present

Major junctions
- South end: US 44 in North Providence
- Route 116 in Smithfield; Route 7 in North Smithfield; Route 146 in North Smithfield; Route 122 in Woonsocket
- North end: Worrall Street in Woonsocket

Location
- Country: United States
- State: Rhode Island

Highway system
- Rhode Island Routes
← Route 103	→ Route 107

Route 104 is a 13.4-mile-long (21.6 km) numbered state highway in the U.S. state of Rhode Island. It runs from US 44 in North Providence to Worrall Street in Downtown Woonsocket. The route connects the cities of Providence and Woonsocket via the town center of Smithfield.

== Route description ==
Route 104 begins as Waterman Avenue at an intersection with US 44 in North Providence. It proceeds northwest into the town of Smithfield. The road name changes to Farnum Pike as the route passes through the Georgiaville section of the town. The route soon crosses under I-295 without an interchange. Route 104 continues its northwest path through Smithfield center and eventually enters the town of North Smithfield. In North Smithfield, it turns north and intersects Route 7. Beyond the Route 7 junction, Route 104 shifts to Greenville Road, which bends eastward at Primrose Pond. Route 104 then reaches the city of Woonsocket, going along Providence Street and Main Street. State maintenance of the road ends at the intersection with Route 146A at the city line but signage for Route 104 continues into downtown Woonsocket, ending at Worrall Street.

The Rhode Island Department of Transportation Pavement Log shows Route 104 ending at the corner of Providence Street and South Main Street in Woonsocket. Signage, however, clearly shows Route 104 ending at Worrall Street. Some of this signage was put up by the City, some was put up by the State. Some old signage shows Route 104 continuing along Clinton Street (northbound) and Worrall Street and Social Street (southbound) to end at Route 126, but most of the southbound signs now say TO 104.

== History ==
In 1808, a private toll road was built between North Providence and Smithfield known as the Farnum and Providence Turnpike along what is now the Farnum Pike portion of modern Route 104. In 1873 the State of Rhode Island purchased the road for $500 from the private owners and made the road free. Route 104 was designated in 1923 along the Farnum turnpike alignment with extensions on both ends into downtown Providence and downtown Woonsocket. In Woonsocket, the route originally ended at Route 126 (Cumberland Street). In Providence, the old route used Woonasquatucket Avenue and Manton Avenue to end at Route 128.

== Major intersections ==
The entire route is in Providence County.

Location	mi	km	Destinations	Notes
North Providence	0.0	0.0	US 44 (Smith Street)	Southern terminus
Smithfield	4.2	6.8	Route 5 south / Route 116 south (Pleasant View Avenue)	Southern terminus of concurrency with Route 5 / Route 116
Smithfield	4.4	7.1	Route 116 north (George Washington Highway)	Northern terminus of concurrency with Route 116
North Smithfield	7.0	11.3	Route 7 south (Douglas Pike)	Southern terminus of concurrency with Route 7
North Smithfield	7.1	11.4	Route 7 north (Douglas Pike)	Northern terminus of concurrency with Route 7
North Smithfield	8.5	13.7	Route 5 north (Providence Pike)	Northern terminus of concurrency with Route 5
North Smithfield	10.3	16.6	Route 146 – Providence, Worcester, MA	Partial cloverleaf interchange; exit 11 on Route 146
Woonsocket	11.1	17.9	Route 146A (Smithfield Road)	
Woonsocket	12.6	20.3	Route 122 (Main Street)	Southern terminus of concurrency with Route 122 along Main Street
Woonsocket	13.3	21.4	Route 122 south (Railroad Street)	Northern terminus of concurrency with Route 122 south
Woonsocket	13.4	21.6	Worrall Street	Northern terminus
1.000 mi = 1.609 km; 1.000 km = 0.621 mi: Concurrency terminus
