= Forestdale, Rhode Island =

- Forestdale Mill Village Historic District
- U.S. National Register of Historic Places
- U.S. Historic district
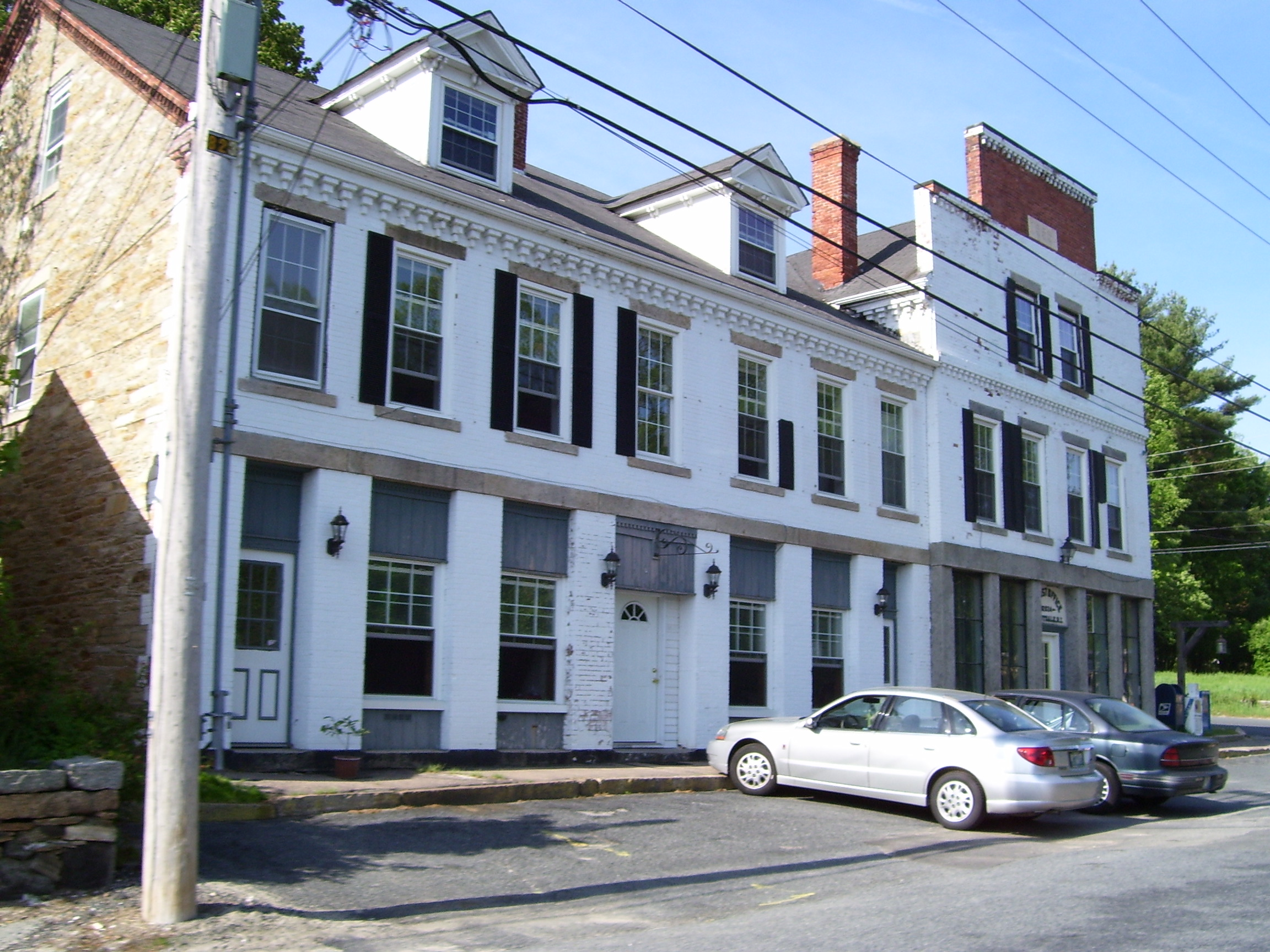
- Forestdale's main factory block from the nineteenth century, currently has a post office

- Location within Rhode Island Location within the United States
- Location: E and W along Main St. and N on Maple Ave., North Smithfield, Rhode Island
- Coordinates: 41.9975°N 71.563889°W
- Area: 50 acres (20 ha), 50 buildings
- Architectural style: Federal, Victorian
- NRHP reference No.: 72000041
- Added to NRHP: June 5, 1972

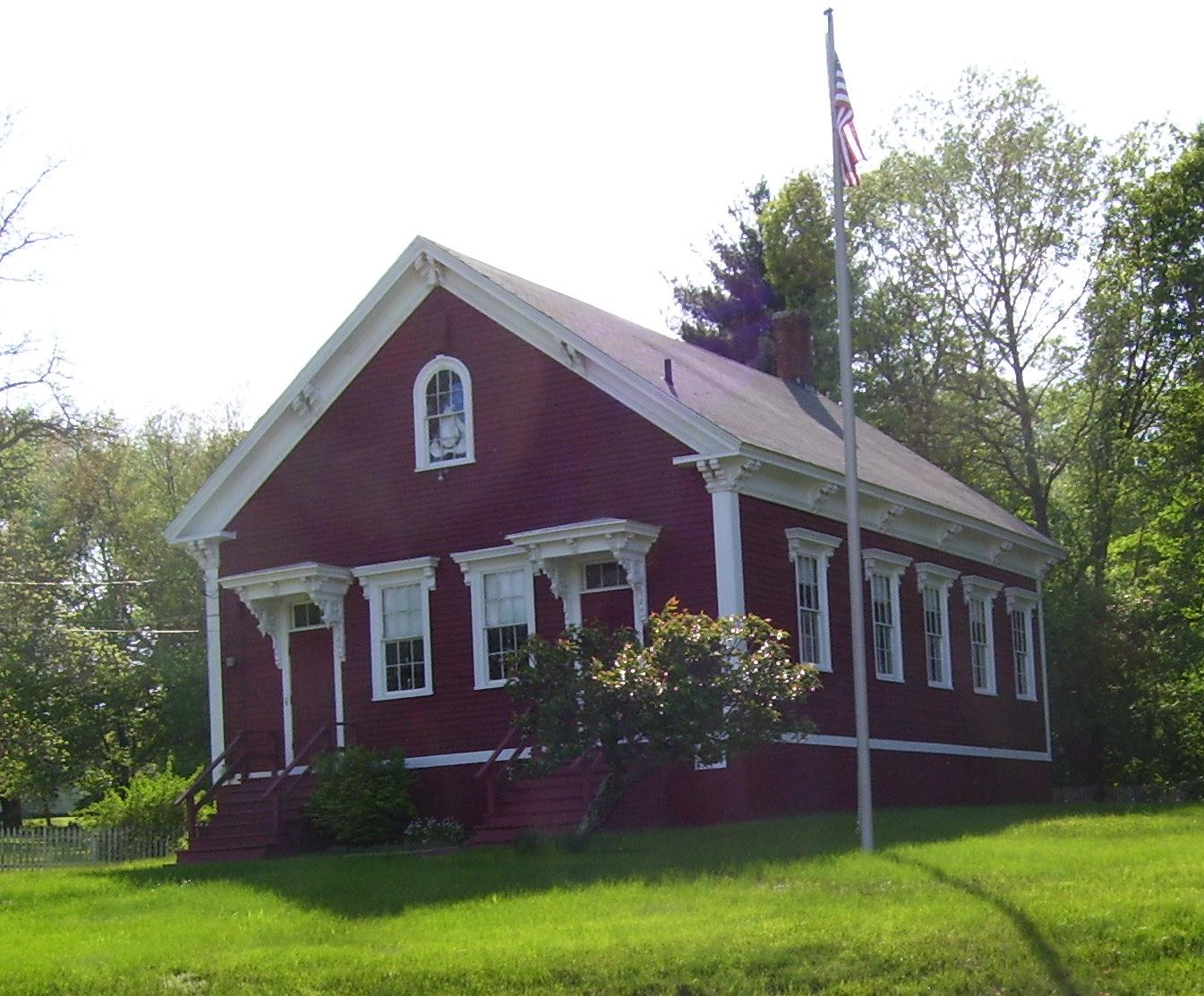
Forestdale School House

Forestdale is a village and historic district in North Smithfield, Rhode Island, United States, one-half mile from Slatersville. The historic district runs east and west along Main Street and north on Maple Avenue. School Street is the primary road through the village, and the one-room schoolhouse for which the street is named still stands. The Branch River runs through the valley adjacent to School Street. The Village Haven Restaurant and local VFW chapter are also located in the village.

== History ==
The village was originally owned by the Forestdale Manufacturing Company, a textile mill, later purchased by John Slater & Co. The Mansfield & Lamb scythe-shop manufactured scythes and later tools in Forestdale starting in 1824, and during the Civil War manufactured swords and sabres for Union forces. The mills used water power from the Branch River to power their equipment.

== See also ==
- National Register of Historic Places listings in Providence County, Rhode Island
