= Peleg Arnold Tavern =

Historic tavern in Rhode Island, United States

- U.S. National Register of Historic Places
- U.S. Historic district – Contributing property
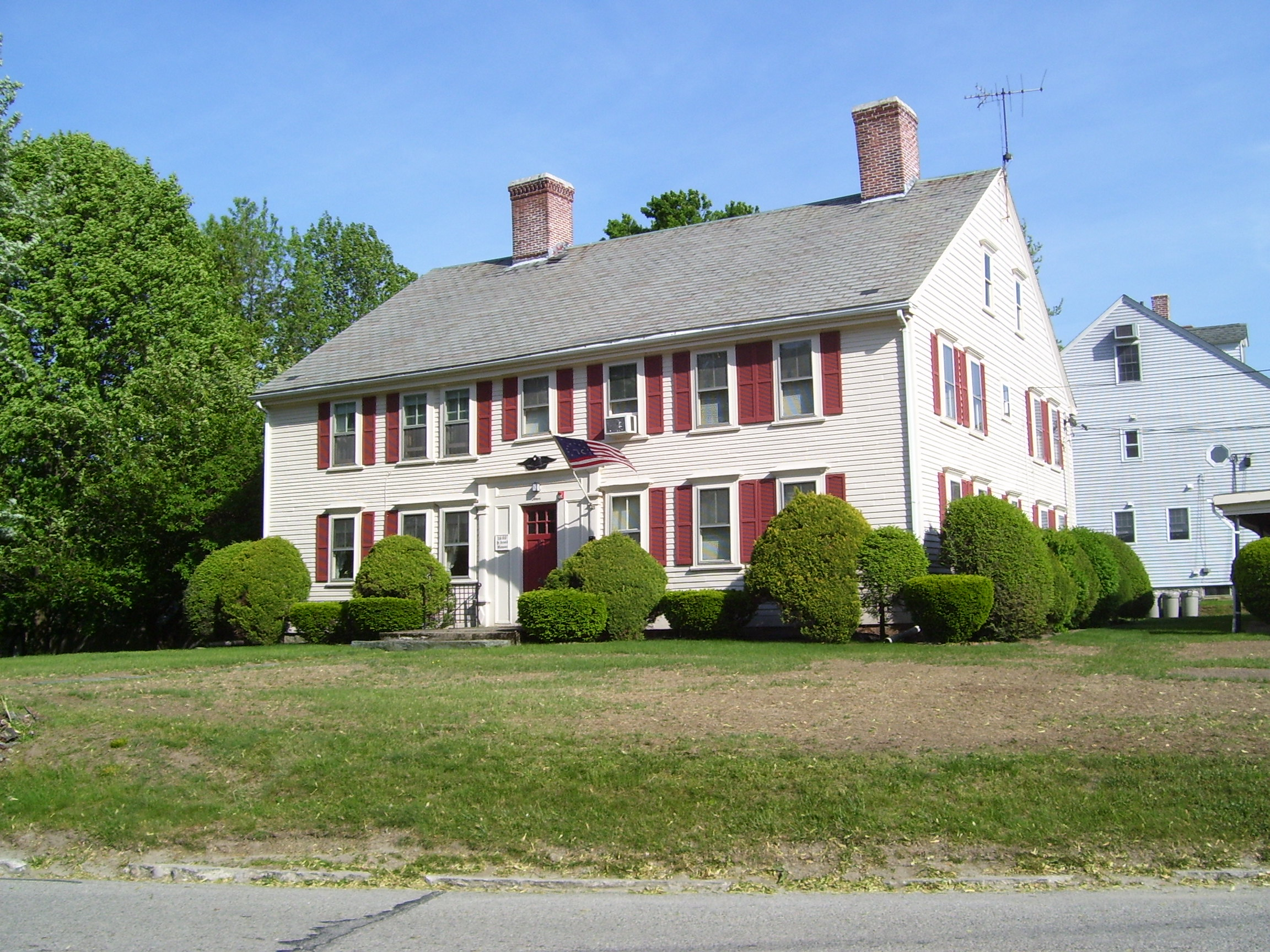
- Peleg Arnold Tavern, built ca. 1690

- Location within Rhode Island Location within the United States
- Location: Union Village, Rhode Island
- Coordinates: 41°59′21″N 71°32′2″W
- Part of: Union Village Historic District (ID78000011)
- NRHP reference No.: 74000046

Significant dates
- Added to NRHP: July 30, 1974
- Designated CP: July 28, 1978

The Peleg Arnold Tavern off Great Road in Union Village in North Smithfield, Rhode Island was built around 1690 and is one of the oldest homes in North Smithfield. The oldest part of house was built in the late 17th century by Richard Arnold, one of the earliest settlers in the area. His descendant, Peleg Arnold, greatly expanded the building a century later. Peleg Arnold was a justice of the Rhode Island Supreme Court and representative to the Continental Congress. Arnold's popular tavern served as center of American military operations in the town during the American Revolution. The house was added to the National Register of Historic Places in 1974.

== Images ==
Peleg Arnold tavern at the turn of the 20th century.

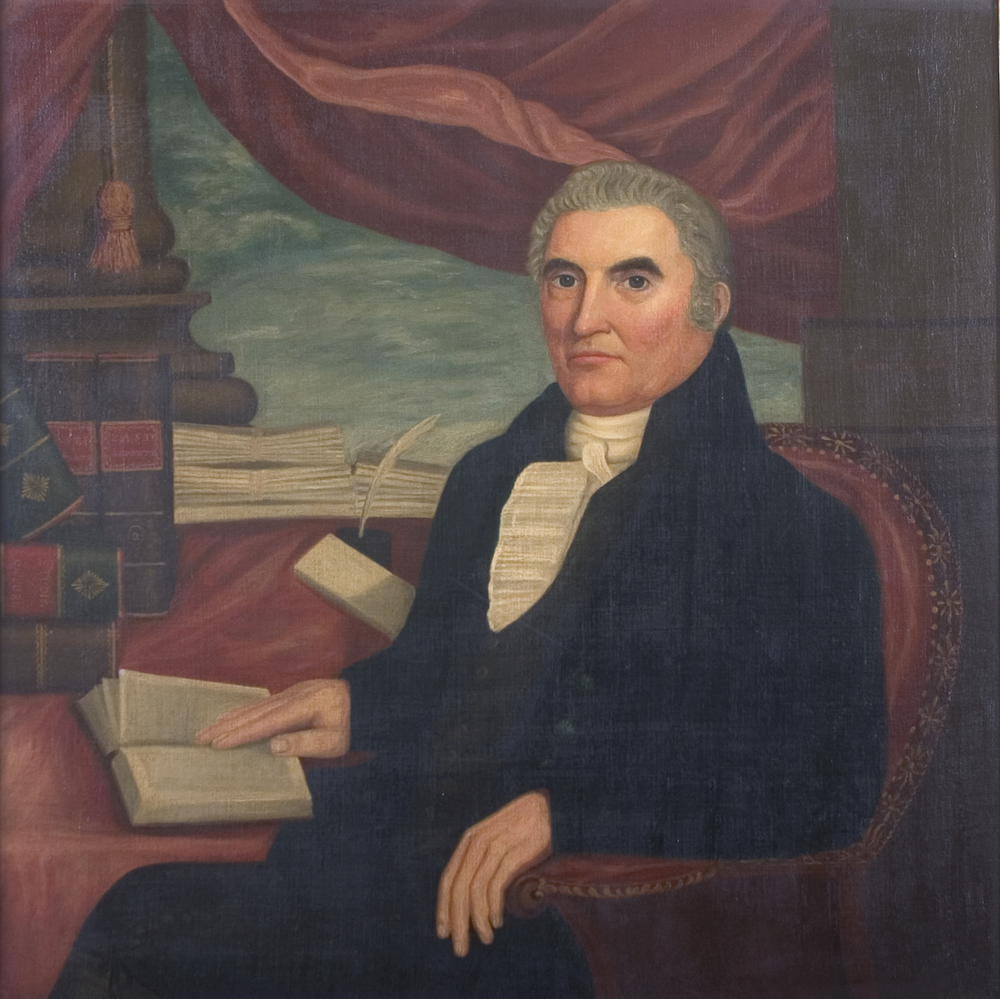
Peleg Arnold portrait from 1815, currently in the John Hay Library at Brown University

== See also ==
- List of the oldest buildings in Rhode Island
- National Register of Historic Places listings in Providence County, Rhode Island

== Sources ==
- Walter Nebiker, The History of North Smithfield (Somersworth, NH: New England History Press, 1976).
- Edward Field, State of Rhode Island and Providence Plantations at the End of the Nineteenth Century, (Mason Pub. Co., RI: 1902), 646–649.
