= Union Village, Rhode Island =

- Union Village Historic District
- U.S. National Register of Historic Places
- U.S. Historic district
- Peleg Arnold's house on Great Road, built ca. 1690, one of the oldest homes in North Smithfield and center of American military operations in the town during the American Revolution

- Location within Rhode Island Location within the United States
- Nearest city: Woonsocket, Rhode Island
- Coordinates: 41°59′28″N 71°32′13″W
- Area: 16 acres (6.5 ha)
- Architect: Allen, Walter
- Architectural style: Italianate, Federal
- NRHP reference No.: 78000011
- Added to NRHP: July 28, 1978

Union Village or "Bank Village" is a village and historic district located in North Smithfield and Woonsocket, Rhode Island, United States on Rhode Island Route 146A. Union Village developed because it was at the crossroads of old Great Road (Smithfield Road Historic District) (connecting Providence and Worcester, Massachusetts) and Pound Hill Road (connecting the Blackstone River falls to Chepachet and Connecticut).

== History ==
Union Village was originally named Woonsocket by Native Americans. The area was part of the original Edward Inman-John Mowry purchase from the Native Americans in 1666. Richard Arnold Jr. settled in the Union Village area in the late 17th century. The area was predominantly a farming community. Later, it became Woonsocket Crossroads, as it was where the Providence-Worcester Highway (Great Road) and Boston - Chepachet Highway (South Main Street and Pound Hill Road) intersected. In 1805, prominent residents incorporated the Smithfield Union Bank. The house containing the bank vault is still intact (2007). Eventually, the village changed its name to Bank Village. The Village was also home to the Smithfield Academy, a prominent school in the nineteenth century. Bank Village taverns served as a way stop for travelers on the way to Boston, Worcester, and Connecticut. It became Smithfield's commercial center through the 1820s. The Marquis de Lafayette allegedly dined at Seth Allen Tavern in Union Village when visiting the United States in 1824-25. Railroads eventually made long-distance stagecoach travel obsolete. The village fell into decline, and in 1852, the bank moved to the Town of Woonsocket. Later, the Village was renamed Union Village.

== Today ==
There are numerous Federal-style houses, the "Smithfield Friends Meeting House, Parsonage & Cemetery" (Quaker) and a large historic cemetery in the area. Wright's Farm on Woonsocket Hill Road has a popular dairy and pastry shop.

A 16-acre (6.5 ha) area of the village in North Smithfield, between Westwood Road and Woonsocket Hill Road, was listed on the National Register of Historic Places in 1978.

== Notable person ==
- Emeline S. Burlingame, suffragist

== Images ==
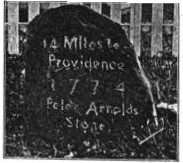
Peleg Arnold's 1774 milestone on old Great Road across from the Quaker Meeting House

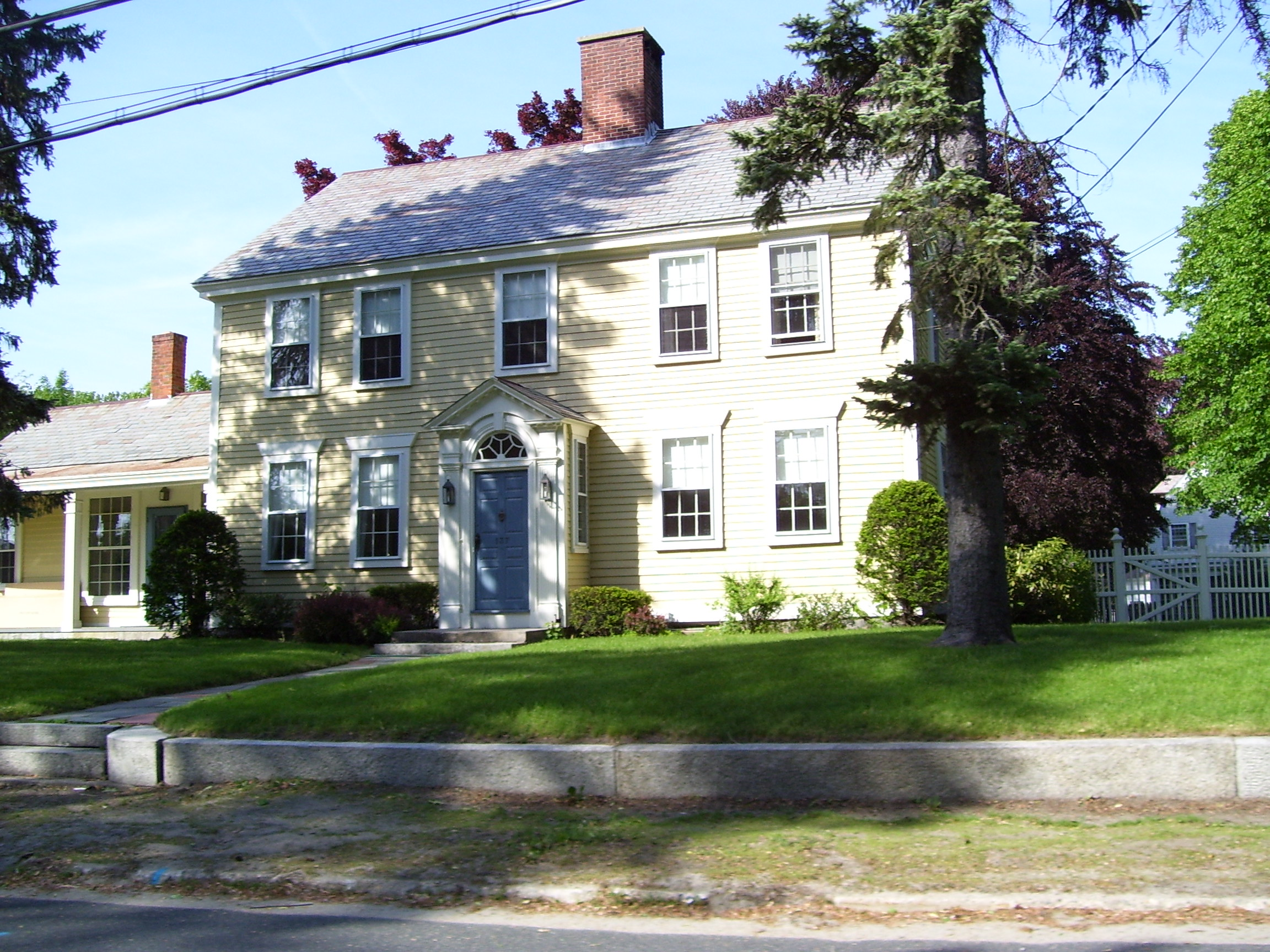
Union Village house built in 1812

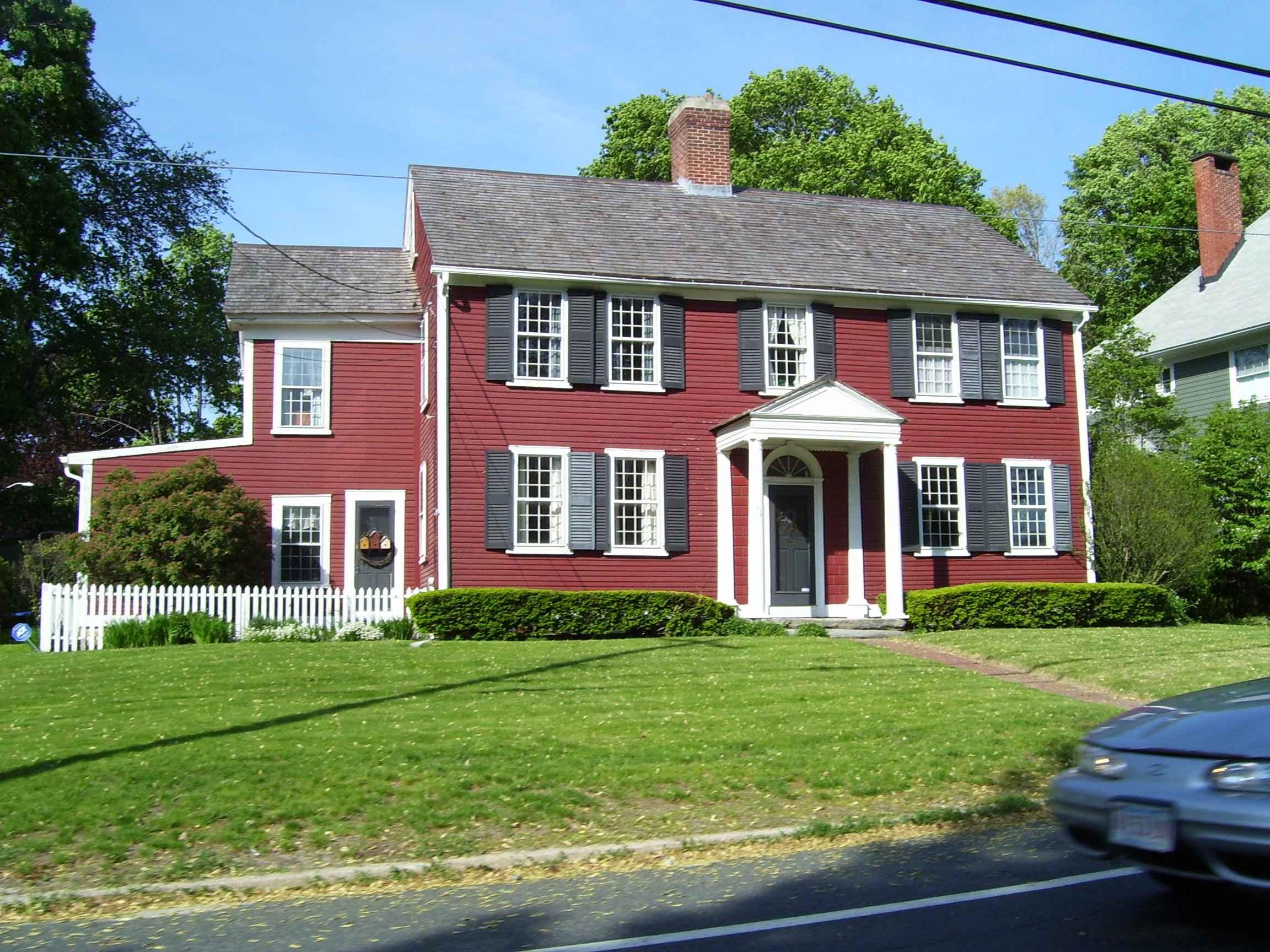
historic Union Village house

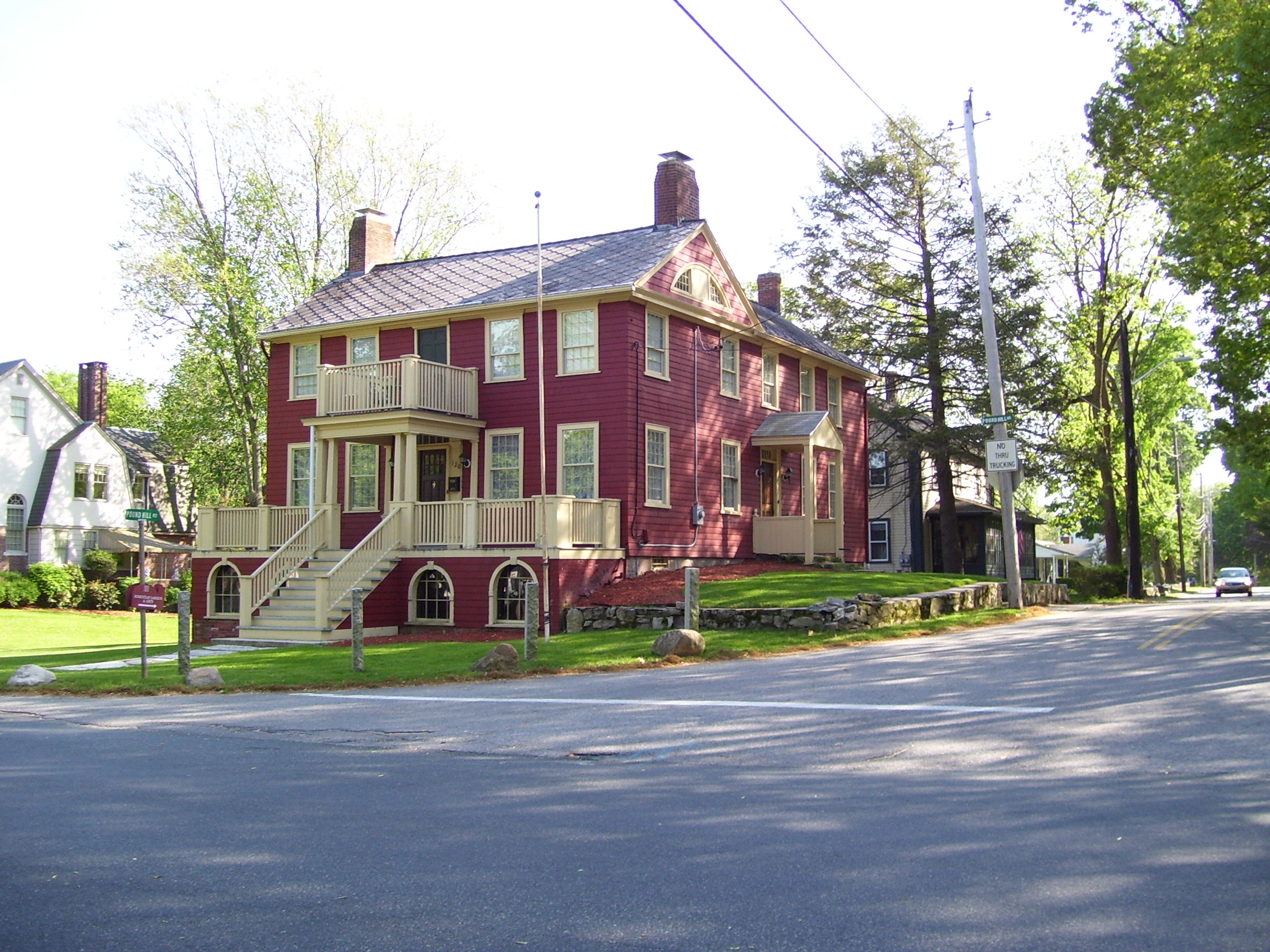
Seth Allen Tavern

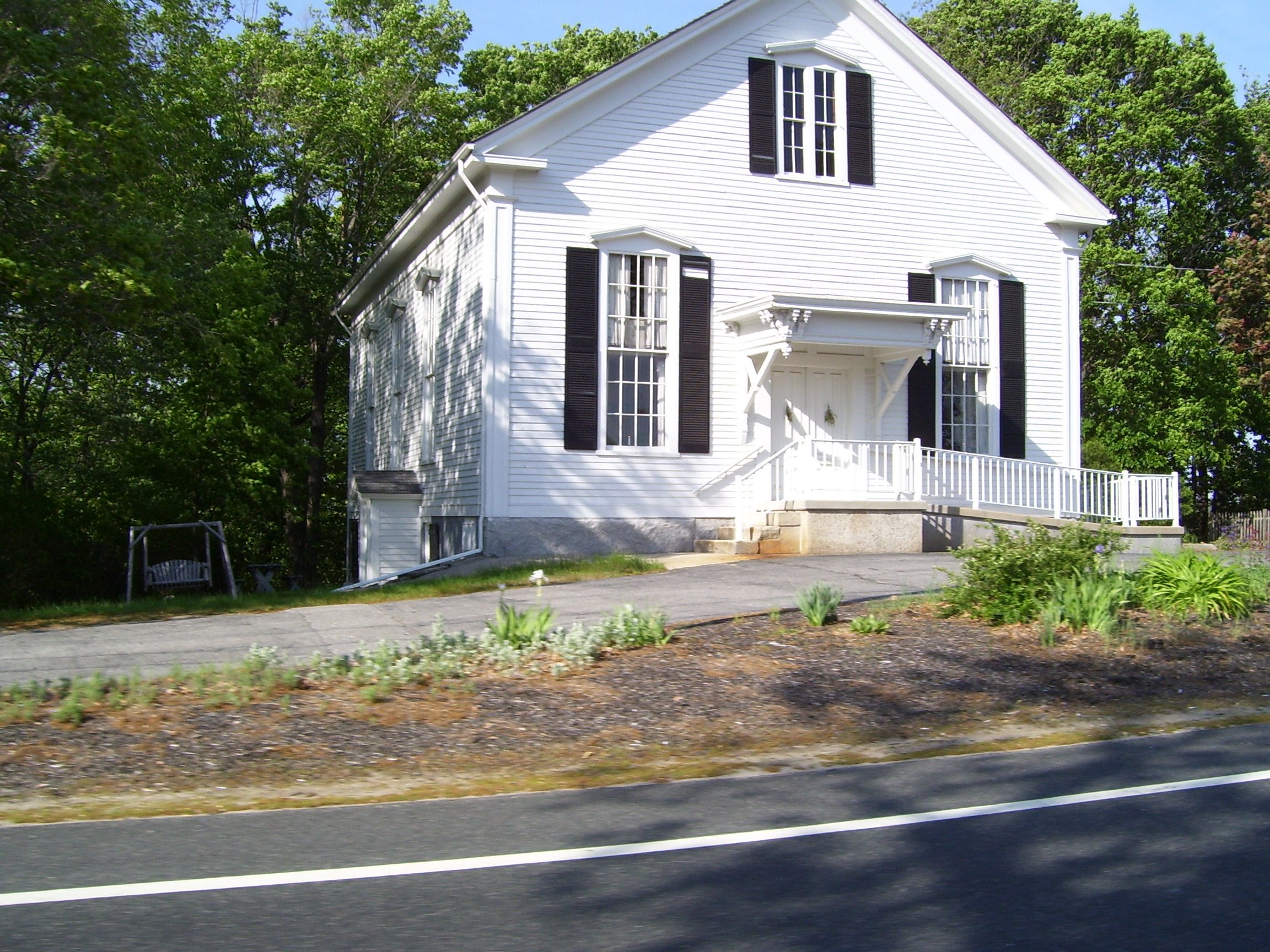
Smithfield Friends Meeting House, Parsonage & Cemetery

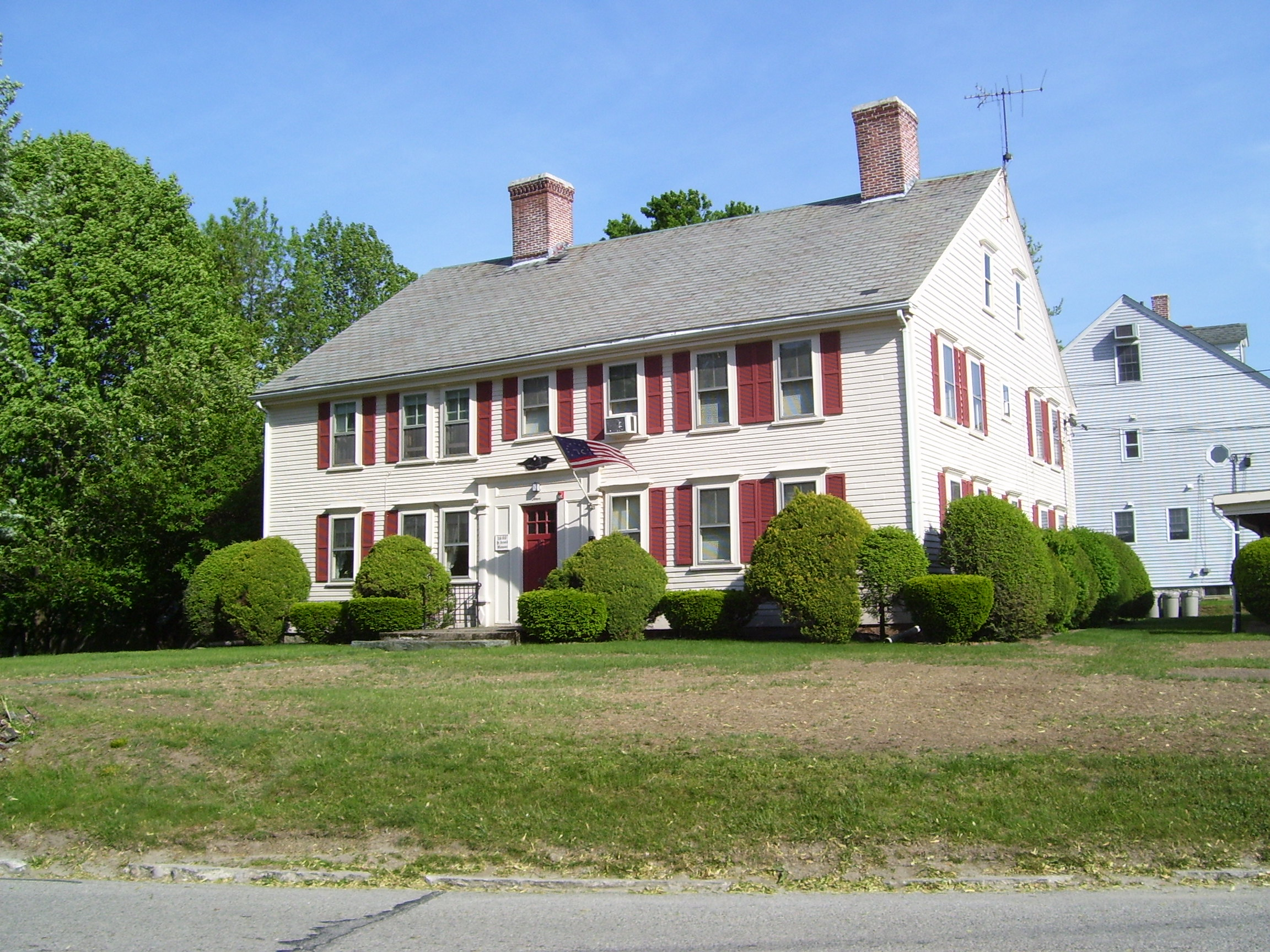
Peleg Arnold Tavern

== See also ==
- National Register of Historic Places listings in Providence County, Rhode Island

== External links and references ==
- Federal Writers Project, Rhode Island: A Guide to the Smallest State (Houghton Mifflin: Boston, 1937), pg. 378
- Union Village info
- Walter Nebiker, The History of North Smithfield (Somersworth, NH: New England History Press, 1976).
