= North Smithfield, Rhode Island =

- Town
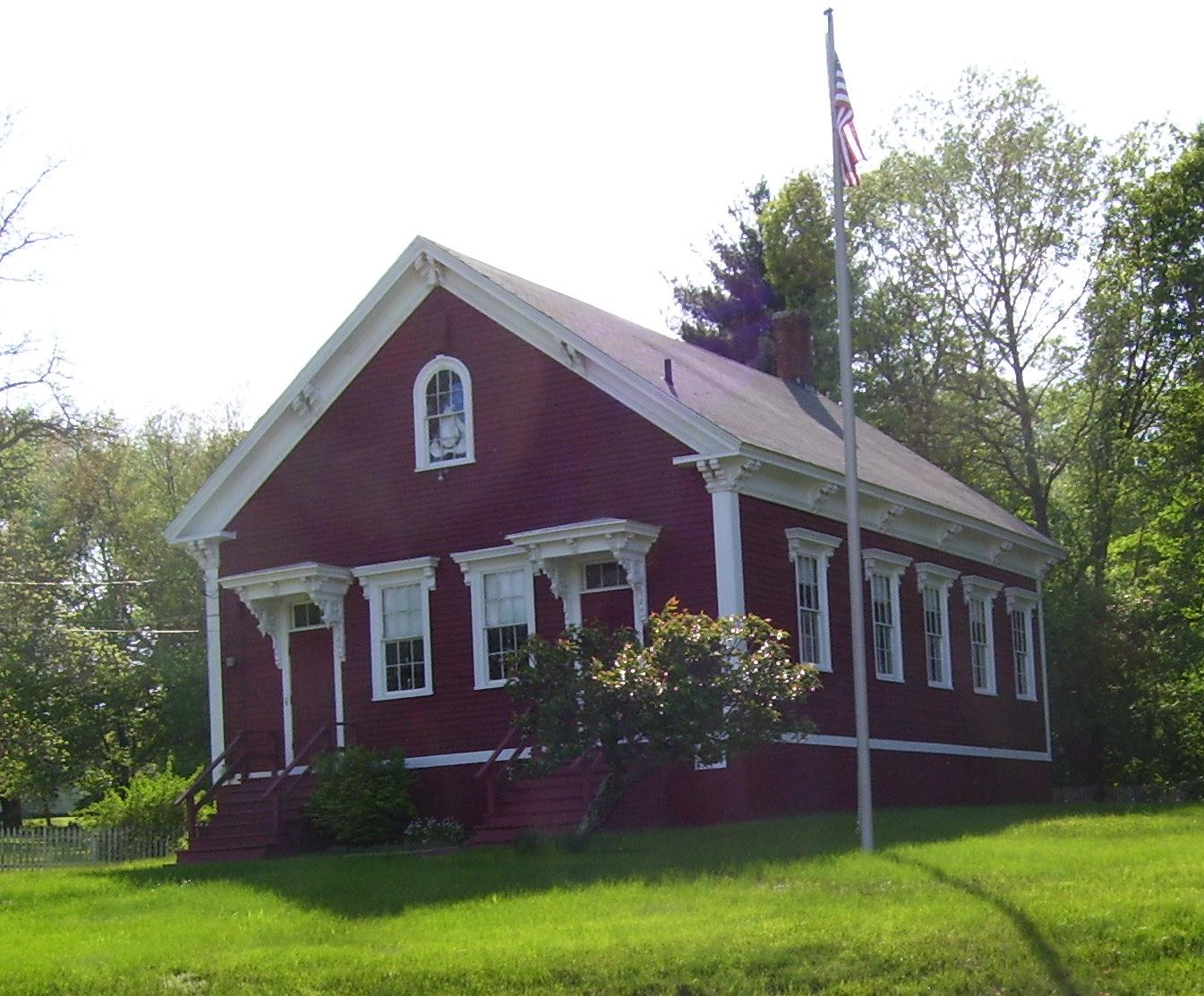
- Forestdale school house from the nineteenth century

- Seal Coat of arms Logo

- Location in Providence County and the state of Rhode Island.
- Coordinates: 41°59′17″N 71°33′7″W
- Country: United States
- State: Rhode Island
- County: Providence

Government
  - Town Administrator: Scott Gibbs
  - Town Council: Kimberly Alves; Rebecca DeCristofaro; John Beauregard; Claire O'Hara; David Punchak

Area
  - Total: 24.7 sq mi (64.1 km^{2})
  - Land: 24.1 sq mi (62.3 km^{2})
  - Water: 0.69 sq mi (1.8 km^{2})
- Elevation: 387 ft (118 m)

Population (2020)
  - Total: 12,558
  - Density: 522/sq mi (201.6/km^{2})
- Time zone: UTC-5 (Eastern (EST))
  - Summer (DST): UTC-4 (EDT)
- ZIP codes: 02824, 02896
- Area code: 401
- FIPS code: 44-52480
- GNIS feature ID: 1219815
- Website: www.nsmithfieldri.gov

North Smithfield is a town in Providence County, Rhode Island, United States, settled as a farming community in 1666 and incorporated into its present form in 1871. North Smithfield includes the historic villages of Forestdale, Primrose, Waterford, Branch Village, Union Village, Park Square, and Slatersville. The population was 12,588 at the 2020 census.

== Geography ==
According to the United States Census Bureau, the town has a total area of 24.7 square miles (64 km^{2}), of which 24.0 square miles (62 km^{2}) is land and 0.7 square miles (1.8 km^{2}) (2.83%) is water. North Smithfield is in a New England upland region. The Branch River and Blackstone Rivers provided much of the power for the early mills in the town. The town consists mainly of temperate forests, with minor elevation changes. At 586 ft (179 m), Woonsocket Hill in North Smithfield is one of the highest points in Rhode Island. Residents can expect mild summers and harsh winters.

== History ==
In the 17th century British colonists settled in North Smithfield developing a farming community that they named after Smithfield, London in England. The town was part of Smithfield, Rhode Island until it was incorporated as North Smithfield in 1871. The first colonization occurred after a Native American, "William Minnian" (also known as "Quashawannamut") a Praying Indian from Punkkupage Massachusetts Bay, on May 14, 1666, and again in 1669 with the permission of King Philip, deeded approximately 2,000 acres" to John Mowry and Edward Inman who partnered with Nathaniel Mowry, John Steere, and Thomas Walling in dividing up the purchased tract. During King Philip's War in 1676 Connecticut militia forces killed the last Narragansett sachem, Queen Quaiapen, and Stonewall John in Mattity Swamp in what is now North Smithfield in the Second Battle of Nipsachuck. In the early 18th century, a Quaker colony developed in what is now North Smithfield (then Smithfield), which extended into south Uxbridge, Massachusetts.

Today North Smithfield is part of the John H. Chaffee Blackstone River Valley National Heritage Corridor. The Blackstone Valley is the oldest industrialized region in the U.S. A local North Smithfield industry today, Berroco Yarns, is a continuation of an original family owned woolen company first established in this valley by Daniel Day in 1809.

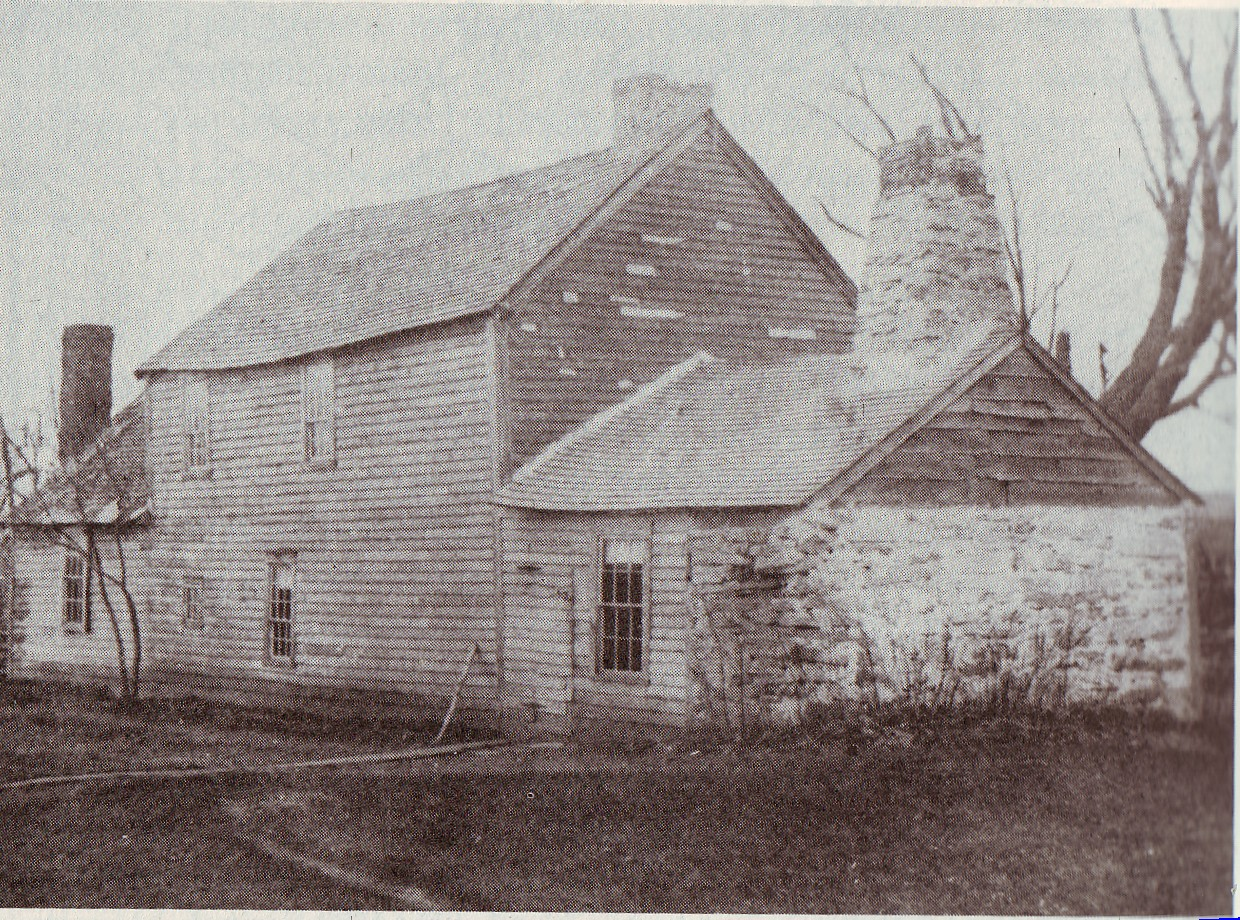
A rare "stone-ender" known as the John Mowry Jr. or Sayles House on Wesquadomeset (Sayles) Hill near Iron Mine Hill and Sayles Hill Roads in North Smithfield, demolished in the 20th century

The village of Slatersville was largely built by Samuel Slater and his brother John Slater beginning in 1803. It is a well-preserved original New England mill village with worker housing and commercial buildings and a church on a village green. This village is in fact America's first planned industrial mill village. Samuel and John's family owned this mill and the village until the turn of the 20th century.

Union Village, along Rhode Island Route 146A achieved local prominence as an important stagecoach stop on the route along Great Road. Union Village was also home to a hat shop, taverns, an academy and the Union Bank from which the village got its name. The North Smithfield Public Library was founded in 1931 with the first branch in the Union Village school. In 1965 Fogarty Hospital was constructed in the town.

In the nineteenth and early twentieth-century, North Smithfield "was served by several trolley and railroad lines; now all are gone save one. A freight-only spur line of the Providence and Worcester Railroad extends from the main line in Woonsocket and terminates [in Slatersville] at the Providence Pike" where it "primarily serves a single customer, a steel supplier called Denman and Davis," a company in Slatersville which is now part of O’Neal Steel, Inc.

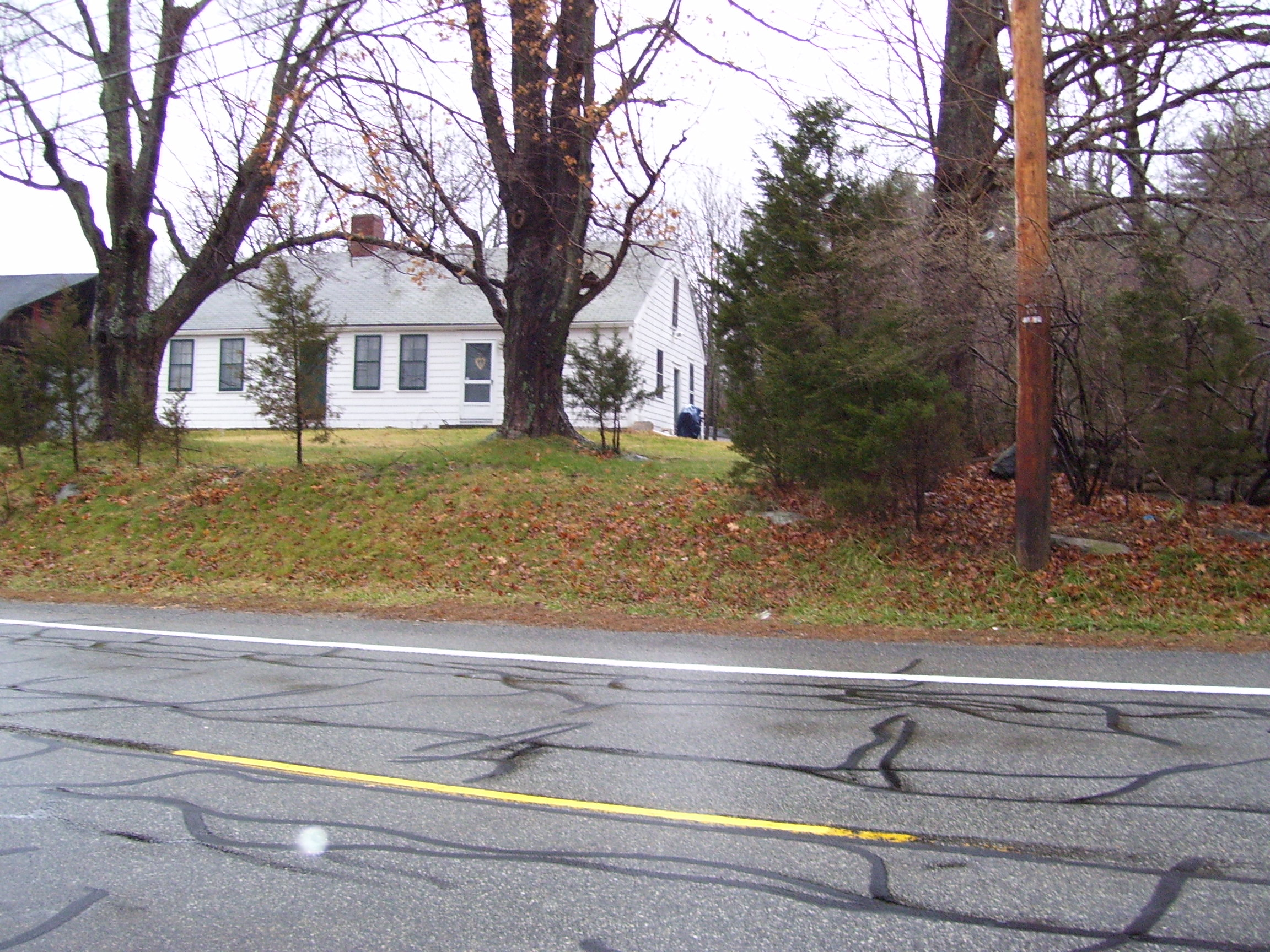
Mowry House c. 1690, on Providence Pike in North Smithfield

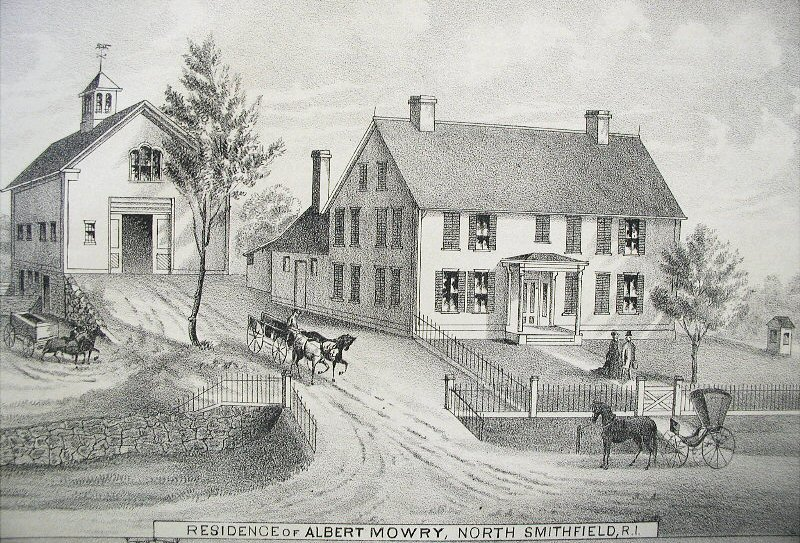
Albert Mowry farmhouse in North Smithfield in the 19th century

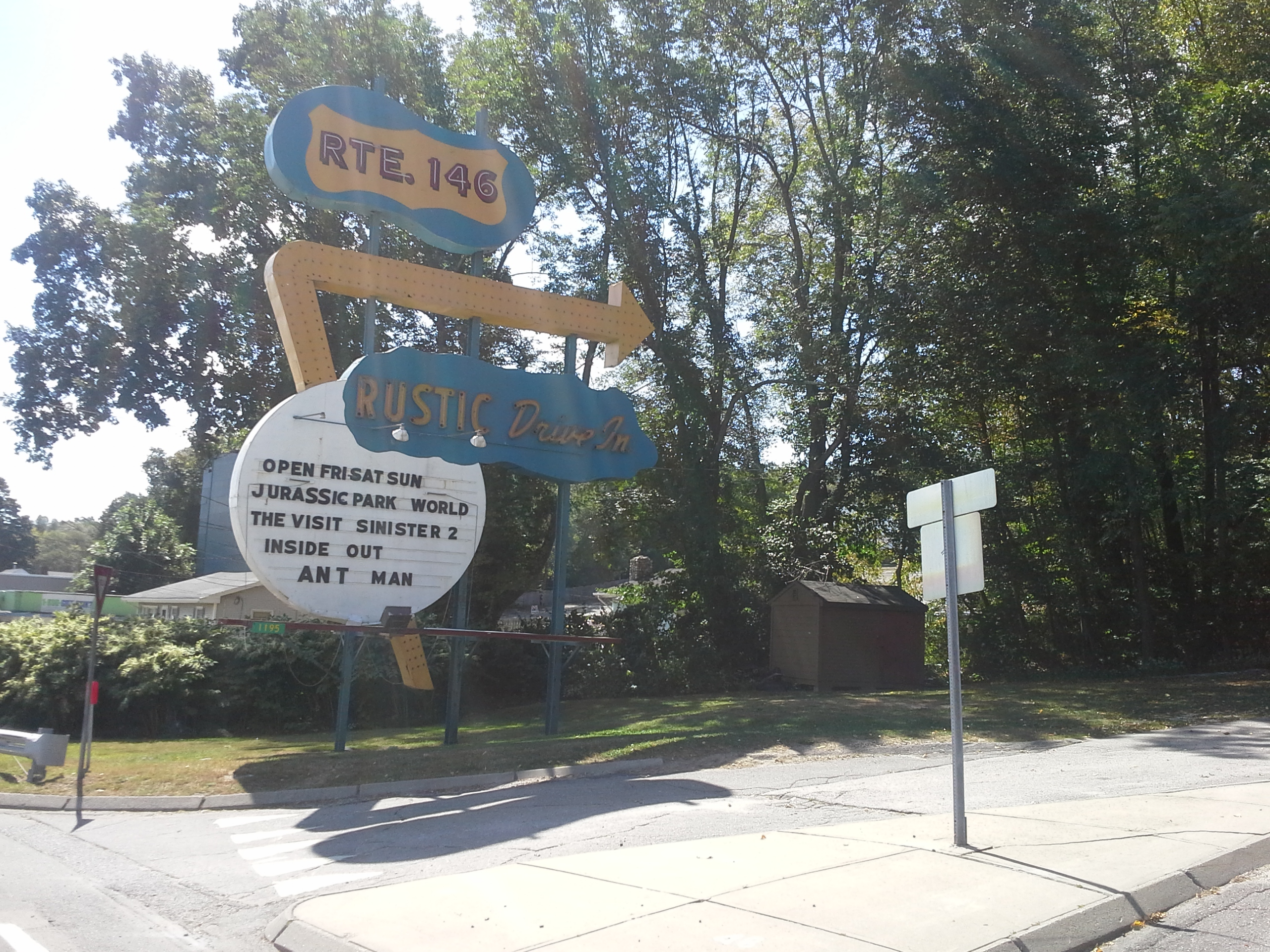
Rustic Drive In Movie Theater (1951) in North Smithfield, the last drive in surviving in the state

== Demographics ==
Historical population
Census	Pop.	Note	%±
1870	3,052		—
1880	3,088		1.2%
1890	3,173		2.8%
1900	2,422		−23.7%
1910	2,699		11.4%
1920	3,200		18.6%
1930	3,945		23.3%
1940	4,196		6.4%
1950	5,726		36.5%
1960	7,632		33.3%
1970	9,349		22.5%
1980	9,972		6.7%
1990	10,497		5.3%
2000	10,618		1.2%
2010	11,967		12.7%
2020	12,588		5.2%
U.S. Decennial Census

As of the census of 2020, there were 12,588 people and 5,044 households in the town. The population density was 526.7 inhabitants per square mile (203.4/km^{2}). There were 5,358 housing units in the town. The racial makeup of the town was 91.27% White, 1.20% African American, 0.07% Native American, 1.33% Asian, 1.70% from other races, and 4.40% from two or more races. Hispanic or Latino people of any race were 4.24% of the population. In 2000, 41% reported either French or French Canadian ancestry, 12% Irish, 12% Italian, and 8% English.

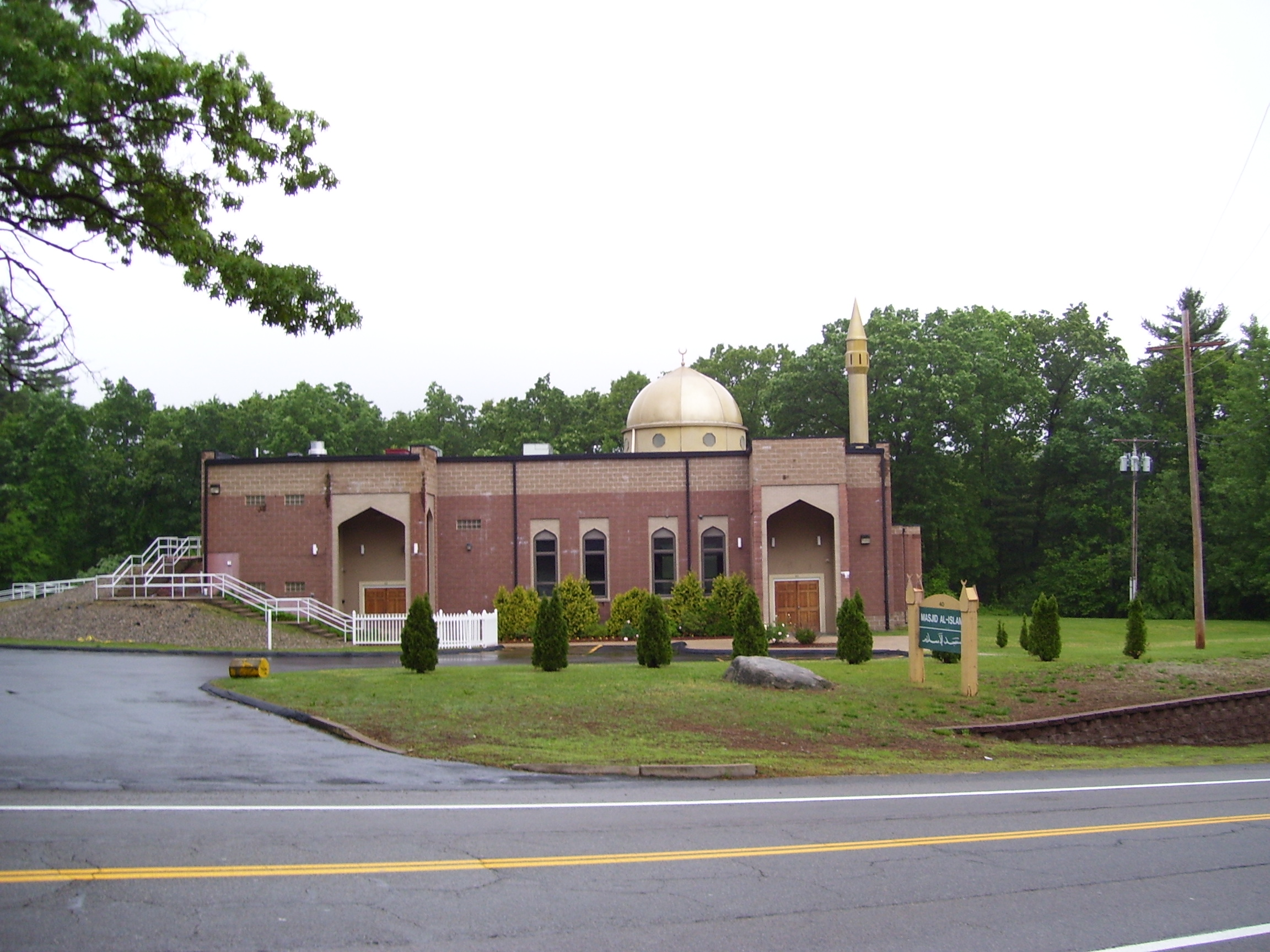
Masjid Al Islam mosque on Sayles Hill Road in North Smithfield

There were 5,044 households, out of which 25.8% had children under the age of 18 living with them, 55.2% were married couples living together, 22.8% had a female householder with no spouse present, and 16.0% had a male householder with no spouse present. 12.8% of all households were made up of individuals, and 6.8% had someone living alone who was 65 years of age or older. The average household size was 2.44 and the average family size was 3.07.

In the town, the population was spread out, with 19.0% under the age of 18, 6.1% from 18 to 24, 24.1% from 25 to 44, 30.3% from 45 to 64, and 20.5% who were 65 years of age or older. The median age was 45.7 years.

The median income for a household in the town was $107,813, and the median income for a family was $138,716. The per capita income for the town was $54,094. About 5.2% of the population was below the poverty line, including 4.7% of those under age 18 and 9.6% of those age 65 or over.

== Historic places in North Smithfield ==
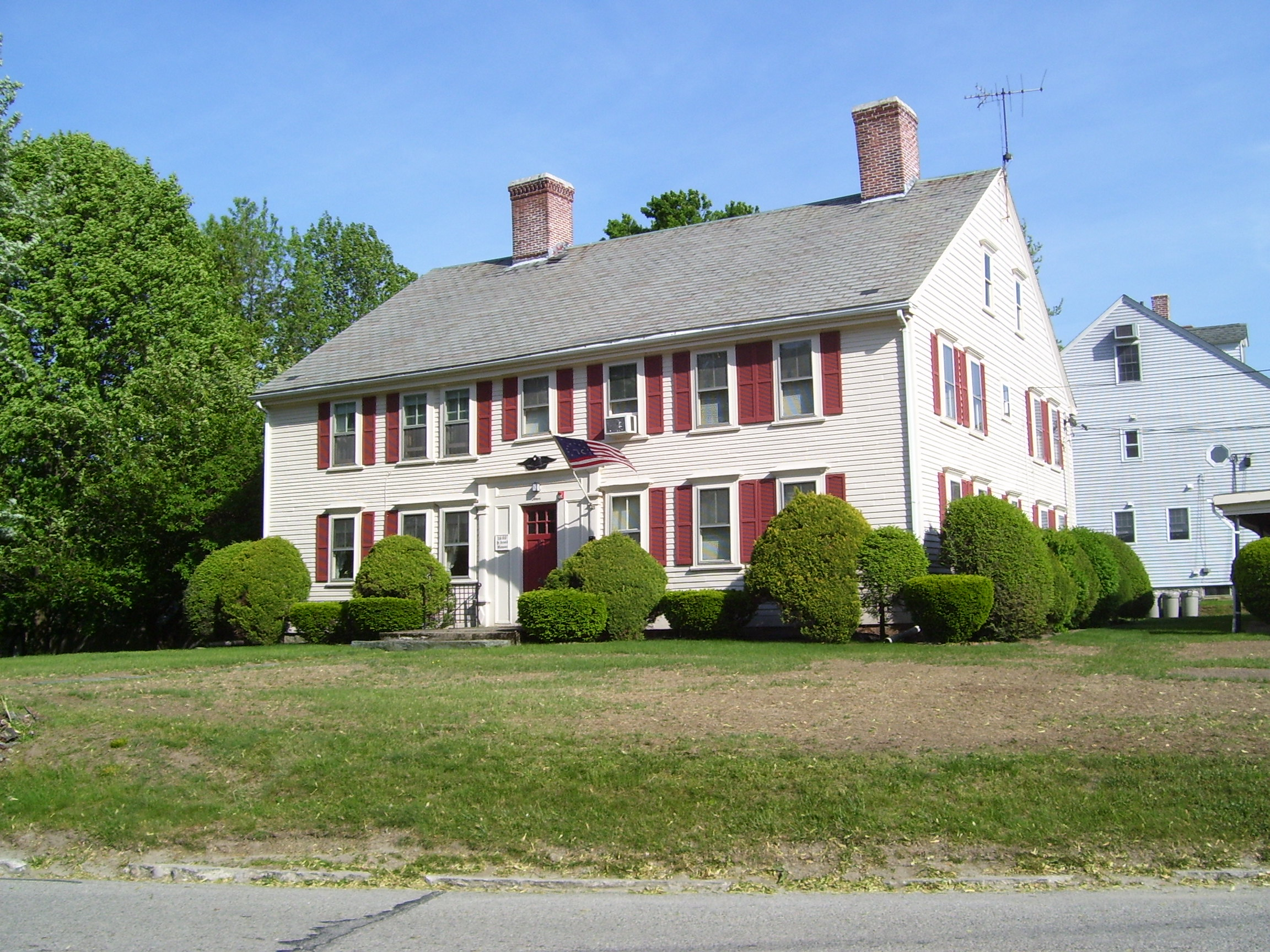
The Peleg Arnold Tavern, built around 1690, was home to Peleg Arnold.

- Second Battle of Nipsachuck Battlefield, site of 1676 battle during King Philip's War
- Slatersville, America's first industrial mill village, established by John Slater and Samuel Slater in 1807
- Smithfield Friends Meeting House, Parsonage & Cemetery, 18th-19th-century Quaker community
- Peleg Arnold Tavern (1690)
- Blackstone Valley National Heritage Corridor
- Forestdale Mill Village Historic District
- Tyler Mowry House (1825)
- William Mowry House (1804)
- Smithfield Road Historic District
- Three Dog Site, RI-151
- Todd Farm (1740)
- Union Village Historic District

== Notable people ==
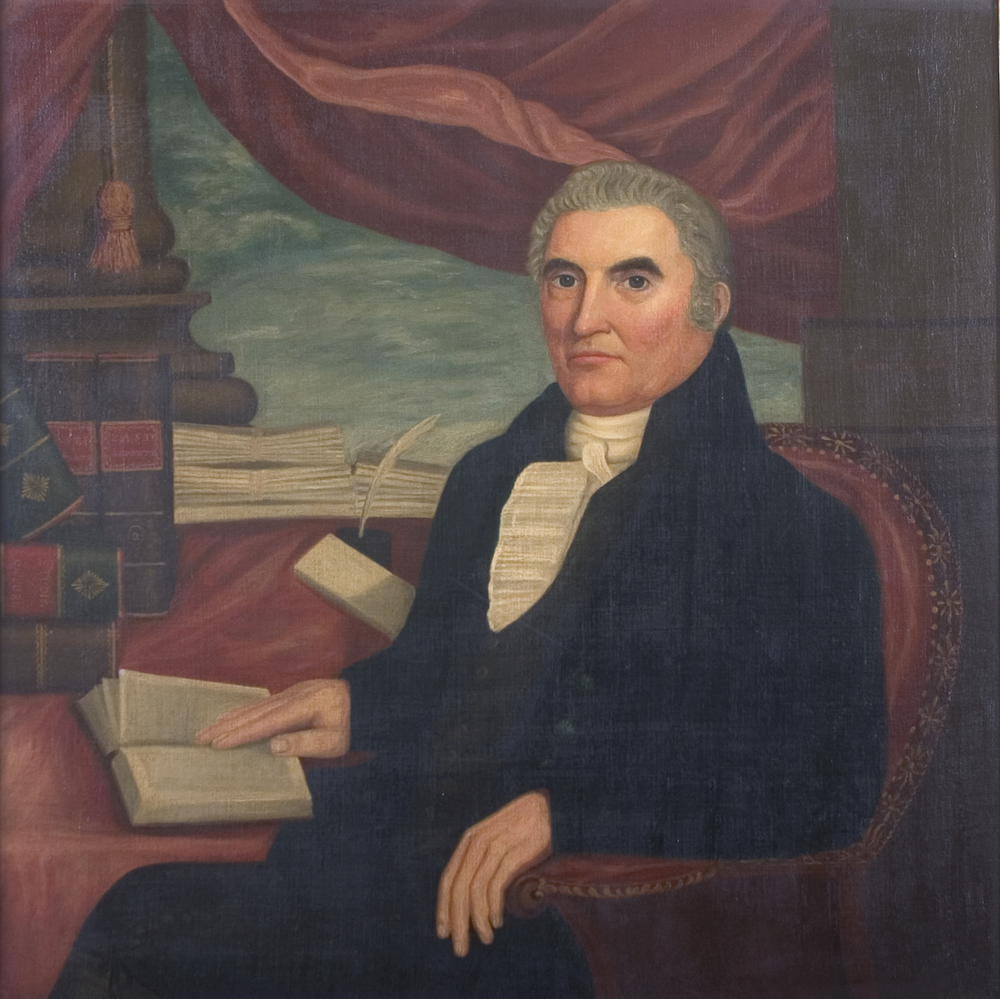
Chief Justice Peleg Arnold was a resident of Union Village in North Smithfield.

- Peleg Arnold, delegate to the Continental Congress (1787–1788); Chief Justice of the Rhode Island Supreme Court (1795–1812)
- Ella Maria Ballou, essayist, stenographer
- Emeline S. Burlingame, evangelist and suffragist
- Joe Connolly, outfielder for the Boston Braves (1913–1916)
- Henry Hobbs, football player and coach
- Jeff Jillson, international hockey defensman
- Tim McNamara, Boston Braves and New York Giants pitcher (1922–1926); died in North Smithfield
- Joseph O'Donnell Jr., Lieutenant Governor of Rhode Island
- David Rawlings, musician; guitarist with wife Gillian Welch
- John Slater, industrialist, founder of Slatersville
- John Fox Slater, businessman, philanthropist, abolitionist, supporter of freed slaves
- R. E. Streeter, Christian writer; founder of the Pastoral Bible Institute in 1918

== Education ==
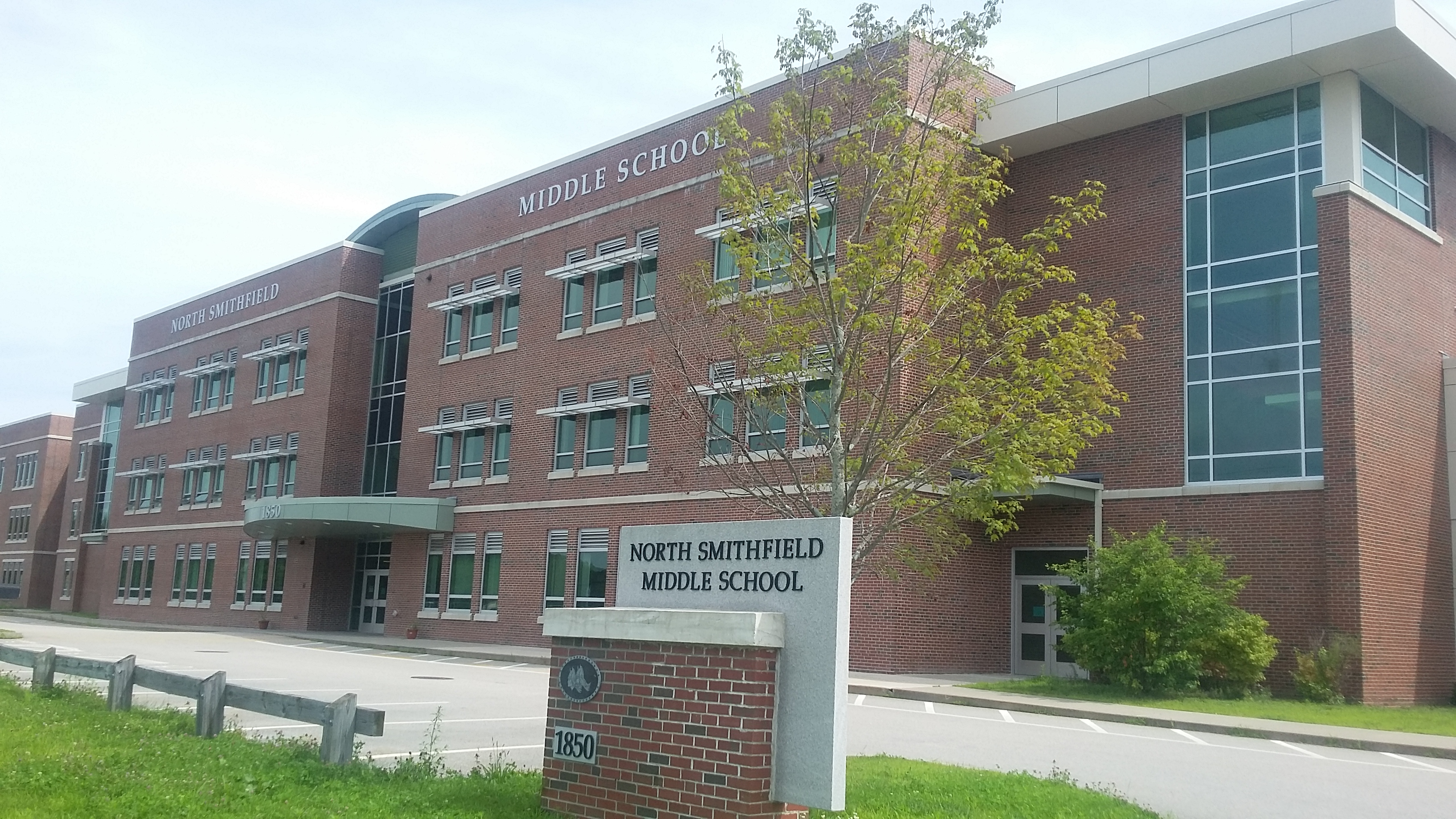
North Smithfield Middle School, opened in 2008–2009

The North Smithfield School District consists of four active schools:

- North Smithfield High School, the only public high school in the town, was ranked 5th out of 51 public high schools in Rhode Island in 2016.
- North Smithfield Elementary School was built in 1989 and is now used for preschool-fourth grade.
- North Smithfield Middle School was built for the 2008–2009 school year and now holds grades 5–8.
- Dr. Harry L. Halliwell School was built in 1958, and used for grades 3–5. The school was decommissioned in the summer of 2019. Before it became a school, it was a sheep farm.
- The Kendall Dean School was built in 1936 but is no longer used as a school. It is currently being used as an administrative building for the town.

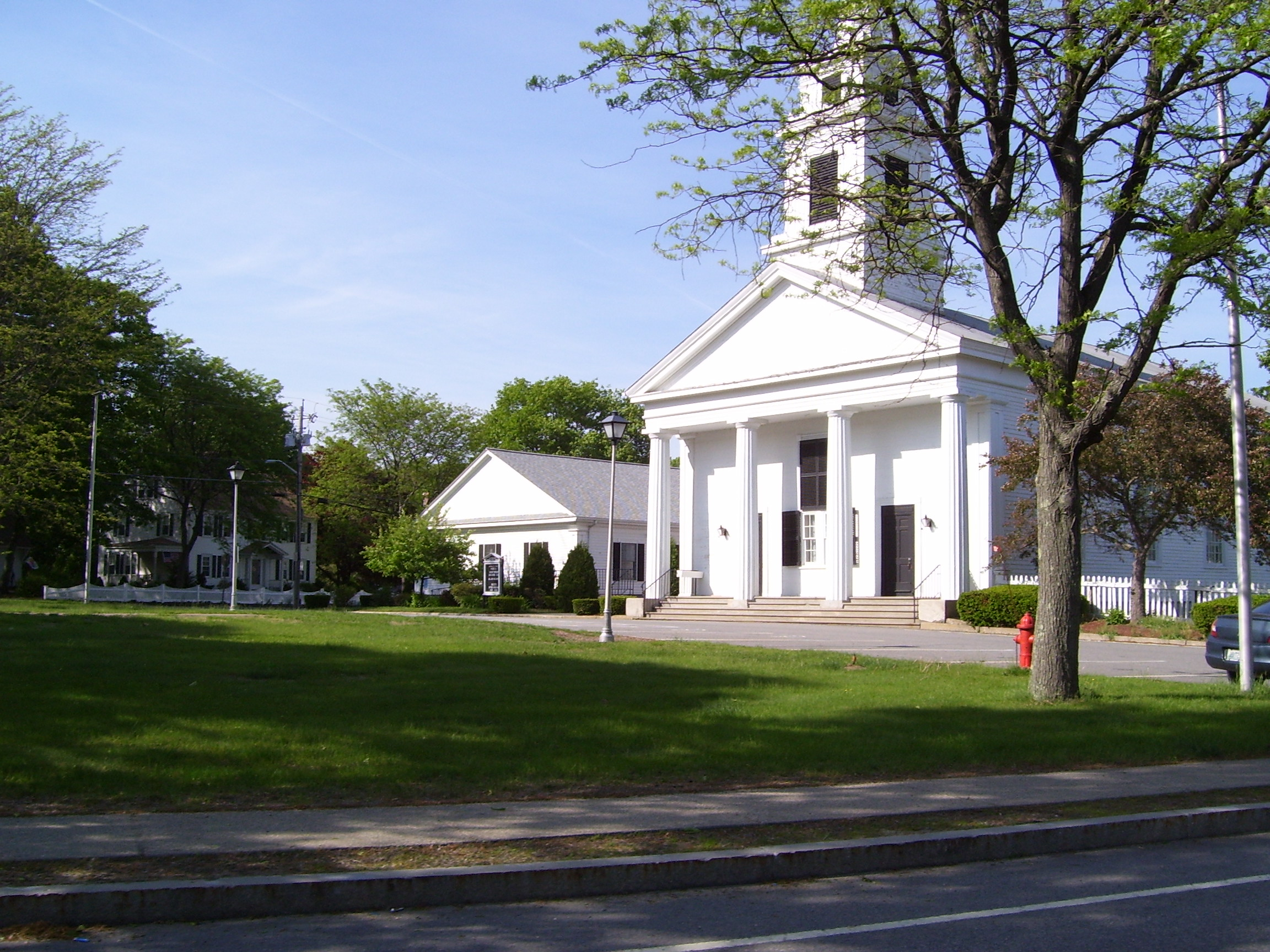
Slatersville Green and the Congregational Church

== Houses of worship ==
- Lighthouse Christian Church
- Masjid Al-Islam mosque
- Slatersville Congregational Church
- St. John the Evangelist Church
