= William Mowry House =

Historic house in Rhode Island, United States

- U.S. National Register of Historic Places
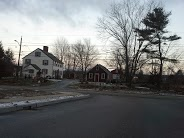

- Location within Rhode Island Location within the United States
- Location: 622 Greenville Road, North Smithfield, Rhode Island
- Coordinates: 41°56′52″N 71°33′33″W
- Area: 2 acres (0.81 ha)
- Built: 1802
- Architectural style: Federal
- NRHP reference No.: 83000001
- Added to NRHP: February 10, 1983

The William Mowry House is an historic farm house on Farnum Pike in North Smithfield, Rhode Island, United States. It is a 2 1/2-story plank-framed house, five bays wide, with a gable roof and a large central chimney. The main entrance is centered on the main (south-facing) entry, and is enclosed within a single-story hip-roof vestibule of 20th-century construction. A small single-story ell extends to the west of the main block. The interior follows a typical center-chimney plan, with the kitchen and parlor in the front of the house, and the dining room flanked by a small pantry and bathroom in the rear. The house was built c. 1802–05 by William Mowry, whose family has owned land in the area since the 17th century.

The house was listed on the National Register of Historic Places in 1983.

== See also ==
- National Register of Historic Places listings in Providence County, Rhode Island
