= Tyler Mowry House =

Historic house in Rhode Island, United States

- U.S. National Register of Historic Places
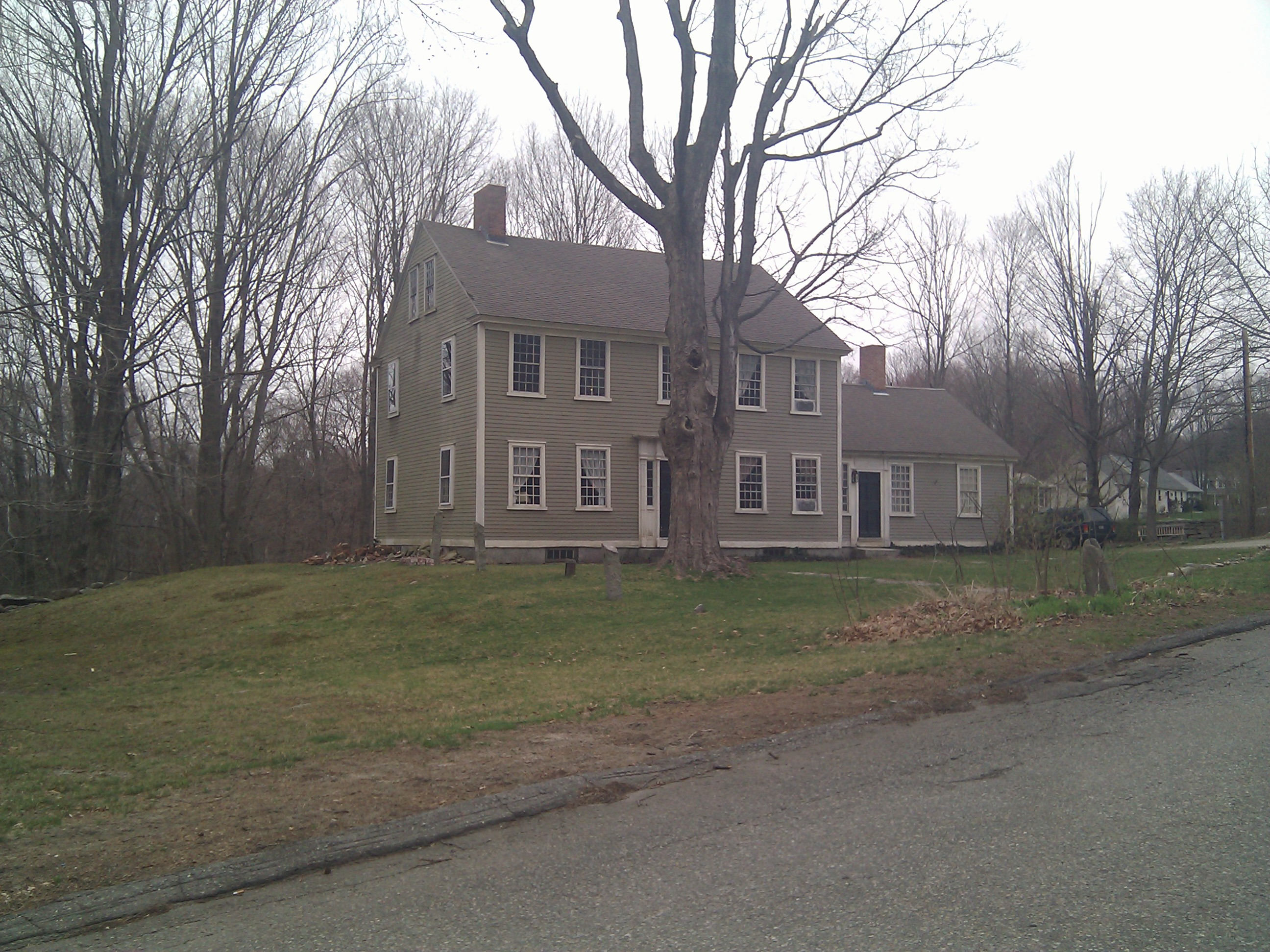

- Location within Rhode Island Location within the United States
- Location: 112 Sayles Hill Road, North Smithfield, Rhode Island
- Coordinates: 41°57′53″N 71°30′18″W
- Area: 3 acres (1.2 ha)
- Built: 1825
- Architectural style: Federal
- NRHP reference No.: 96000904
- Added to NRHP: August 16, 1996

The Tyler Mowry House is a historic house in North Smithfield, Rhode Island. It is a 2 1/2-story wood-frame structure, five bays wide, with a gable roof and two interior chimneys. The entry is centered on the main (south-facing) facade, with sidelight windows and pilasters supporting a complex entablature and cornice. A 1 1/2-story ell extends to the east. The house's interior has retained much of the original Federal-period woodwork, plasterwork, doors, and hardware. The house is distinctive as a remarkably unaltered house from the early 19th century, lacking modernizing alterations such as electricity and plumbing.

The house was listed on the National Register of Historic Places in 1996.

== See also ==
- National Register of Historic Places listings in Providence County, Rhode Island
