= Smithfield Road Historic District =

Historic district in Rhode Island, United States

- U.S. National Register of Historic Places
- U.S. Historic district
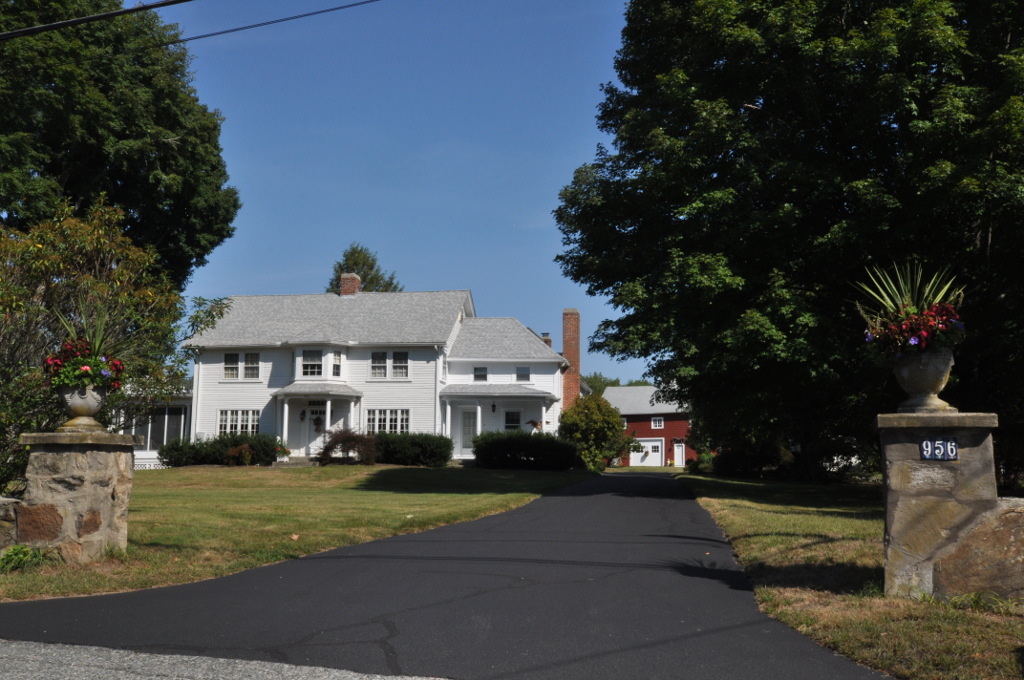

- Location within Rhode Island Location within the United States
- Location: North Smithfield, Rhode Island
- Coordinates: 41°58′2″N 71°29′34″W
- Area: 170 acres (69 ha)
- Architectural style: Greek Revival, Queen Anne, Federal
- NRHP reference No.: 87000036
- Added to NRHP: February 18, 1987

The Smithfield Road Historic District is a rural historic district in North Smithfield, Rhode Island, along Old Smithfield Road (Rhode Island Route 146A). It extends along Old Smithfield Road north from its junction with Sayles Hill Road, and is roughly bisected by Spring Brook. It includes eight historic houses or farmsteads, two 19th-century cemeteries, and a dam (whose construction date is unknown) on Spring Brook just east of the road. The district encompasses a cross-section of the development of agricultural properties in North Smithfield over the 19th century, with properties dating from 1811 (1034 Old Smithfield Road) to 1932 (1172 Old Smithfield Road). The district covers 170 acres (69 ha), which includes lands currently and formerly in agricultural use.

The district was listed on the National Register of Historic Places in 1987.

== See also ==
- National Register of Historic Places listings in Providence County, Rhode Island
