= Runnins River =

River in Massachusetts and Rhode Island, United States

Coordinates: 41°48′59.4″N 71°20′9.6″W

The Runnins River is a river in the U.S. states of Massachusetts and Rhode Island. It flows approximately 14 km (9 mi).

== Course ==
The river begins in Seekonk, Massachusetts in the swamps east of Prospect Street, near Walker Street. From there, the river flows in a southwesterly direction towards East Providence, Rhode Island, where it then forms the boundary between Massachusetts and Rhode Island. It continues flowing along the state line to its end at Mobil Dam. Below Mobil Dam (the boundary between fresh and salt water), the river broadens out and empties into Hundred Acre Cove and becomes the Barrington River.

== Crossings ==
Below is a list of all crossings over the Runnins River. The list starts at the headwaters and goes downstream.

- Seekonk
  - Prospect Street
  - Woodward Avenue
  - Greenwood Avenue
  - Ledge Road
  - Arcade Avenue
  - Taunton Avenue (U.S. 44)
  - Pleasant Street
  - Brook Hill Drive
  - Fall River Avenue (MA 114A)
  - Leonard Street
- East Providence
  - Warren Avenue
  - Interstate 195
  - Highland Avenue (U.S. 6)
  - Mink Road (RI 114A)
  - River Road

== Tributaries ==
Aitken Brook and Luthers Brook are the only named tributaries of Runnins River, though it has many unnamed streams that also feed it.

== See also ==
- List of rivers in Massachusetts
- List of rivers in Rhode Island
- Barrington River (Rhode Island)
