= Rhode Island Route 103 =

State highway in Rhode Island, US

Route 103
- Route 103 in red, Route 103A in blue

Route information
- Maintained by RIDOT
- Length: 11.8 mi (19.0 km)
- Existed: 1923 (truncated 1932)–present

Major junctions
- West end: I-195 in East Providence
- Route 114 in Barrington
- East end: Route 103 in Swansea, MA

Location
- Country: United States
- State: Rhode Island
- Counties: Providence, Bristol

Highway system
- Rhode Island Routes
← Route 102	→ Route 104

Route 103 is a numbered state highway running 11.8 miles (19.0 km) in Rhode Island, United States. It runs from Interstate 195 (I-195) in East Providence to the Massachusetts state line in the town of Warren, where the road continues as Massachusetts Route 103. Route 103 is a major commercial corridor in East Providence.

== Route description ==
Route 103 begins at the eastbound Exit 1D off-ramp of I-195 in East Providence, running along Warren Avenue until the intersection with Route 114. Route 103 turns south with Route 114 along Pawtucket Avenue, with Route 114 soon separating. Route 103 continues south then veers to the southeast along Willett Avenue as it heads towards the town of Barrington. In Barrington, it continues east as County Road, then meets with and overlaps Route 114 for a second time as the routes cross the Barrington and Palmer rivers into the town of Warren. Route 103 separates from Route 114 along Child Street as it continues east towards the Massachusetts state line, where the road continues as Massachusetts Route 103.

== History ==
Route 103 was an original route assigned in 1923. It used to be much longer, extending 38 miles (61 km) through Providence and along present-day Route 14 to Connecticut, where it used to continue as Route 103. In 1932, Connecticut renumbered its 1920s Route 103 to Route 14. Rhode Island renumbered the portion of Route 103 west of Providence to match the new Connecticut route number. Route 14 was not extended through Providence to East Providence, leaving Route 14 to end at US 6 in Providence and RI 103 to start from US 6 in East Providence.

At one time, the main road east from Providence (at first NE 3, now U.S. Route 6 or US 6) used Route 103 rather than the current US 6 alignment. Maps disagree on when the change to the current alignment took place. However, rather than using Warren Avenue to the Washington Bridge, the main road continued north on Pawtucket Avenue to Waterman Avenue. It used Waterman Avenue over the old Red Bridge to Providence. When the main road was moved to current US 6, it at first continued to use Waterman Avenue via MA 114A and County Street to the state line.

The current alignment of Route 103 along Warren Avenue in East Providence was also US 6 before I-195 was built. Some signs still mark it as US 6, including some signs placed since 2000.

== Major intersections ==
County	Location	mi	km	Destinations	Notes
Providence	East Providence	0.0	0.0	I-195 west / US 6 west / US 1A south – Providence	Western terminus, exit 1D on I-195 / US 6 / US 1A eastbound
Providence	East Providence	0.7	1.1	Broadway to I-195 west	
Providence	East Providence	0.9	1.4	I-195 east – Fall River, MA	Exit 2 on I-195
Providence	East Providence	1.3	2.1	US 1A / Route 114 north (Pawtucket Avenue)	Western terminus of concurrency with Route 114
Providence	East Providence	2.2	3.5	Route 114 south (Wampanoag Trail)	Eastern terminus of concurrency with Route 114
Providence	Riverside	3.7	6.0	Route 103A east (Bullocks Point Avenue)	West end of Route 103A
Providence	Riverside	5.4	8.7	Route 103A west (Crescent View Avenue)	Traffic circle, east end of Route 103A
Bristol	Barrington	6.5	10.5	Route 114 north – Providence	Interchange, u-turn required to exit Route 114; Western terminus of concurrency with Route 114
Bristol	Barrington River	8.8	14.2	Bridge	
Bristol	Palmer River	9.1	14.6	Bridge	
Bristol	Warren	9.8	15.8	Route 114 south (Main Street)	Eastern terminus of concurrency with Route 114
Bristol	Warren	10.4– 10.5	16.7– 16.9	Route 136 (Arlington / Metacom Avenues)	One-way pair
Bristol	Warren	11.8	19.0	Route 103 east – Swansea	Continuation into Massachusetts
1.000 mi = 1.609 km; 1.000 km = 0.621 mi

== Route 103A ==
Route 103A
- Location: East Providence
- Length: 2.0 mi (3.2 km)

Route 103A is a 2.0-mile (3.2 km) loop route of Route 103 in the Riverside section of East Providence. It leaves Route 103, continuing straight along Bullocks Point Avenue where Route 103 veers southeast on Willett Avenue. At the south end of Bullocks Point Avenue in Crescent Park, Route 103A turns east onto Crescent View Avenue, which later ends back at Willett Avenue/Route 103. Route 103A was coordinated as a numbered State Highway in 2001.
