= Palmer River (Massachusetts–Rhode Island) =

River in Massachusetts and Rhode Island, U.S.

Coordinates: 41.733°N 71.289°W

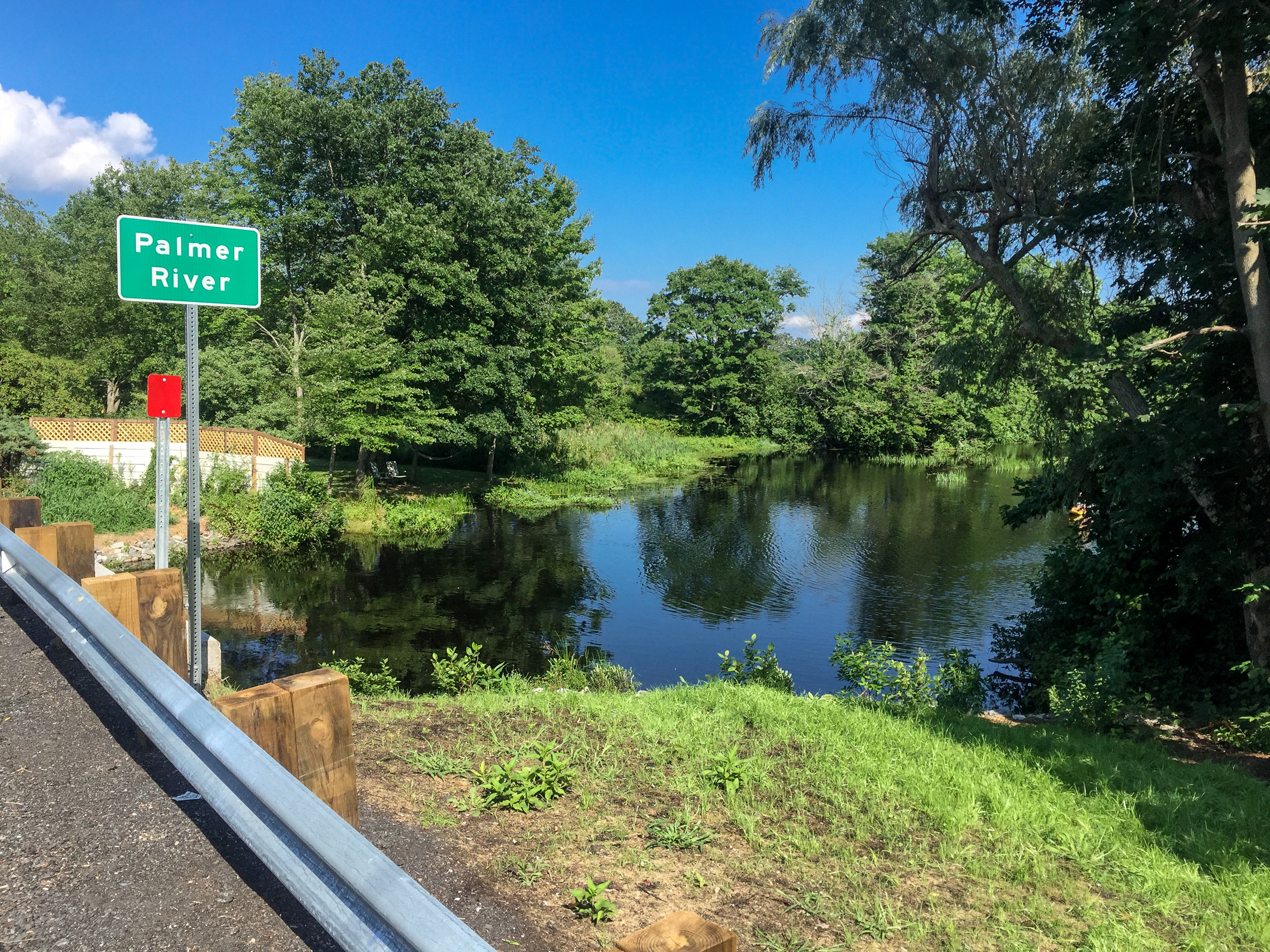
Palmer River at the Wheeler Street crossing in Rehoboth, Massachusetts

The Palmer River is a river in the U.S. states of Massachusetts and Rhode Island. It flows approximately 17 km (11 mi).

== Course ==
The river has two separate branches which converge near the intersection of Danforth Street and Winthrop Street (U.S. 44) in Rehoboth, Massachusetts to form the main branch of the river.

=== West branch ===
The west branch (officially West Branch Palmer River) rises in a small unnamed pond near the eastern intersection of Tremont Street and Agricultural Avenue in Rehoboth. It continues roughly south from here until converging with the east branch. It flows approximately 9 km (5 mi).

=== East branch ===
The east branch (officially East Branch Palmer River) rises in Little Cedar Swamp in North Rehoboth and flows roughly southwest to converge with the west branch. It flows approximately 8 km (5 mi).

=== Main branch ===
After the two branches converge, the river flows roughly south-southwest through Rehoboth and Swansea before crossing into Rhode Island and flowing between Barrington and Warren for its last few miles. At its mouth, it converges with the Barrington River to form the Warren River.

== Crossings ==
Below is a list of all crossings over the Palmer River and its branches. The list begins at the headwaters and goes downstream.

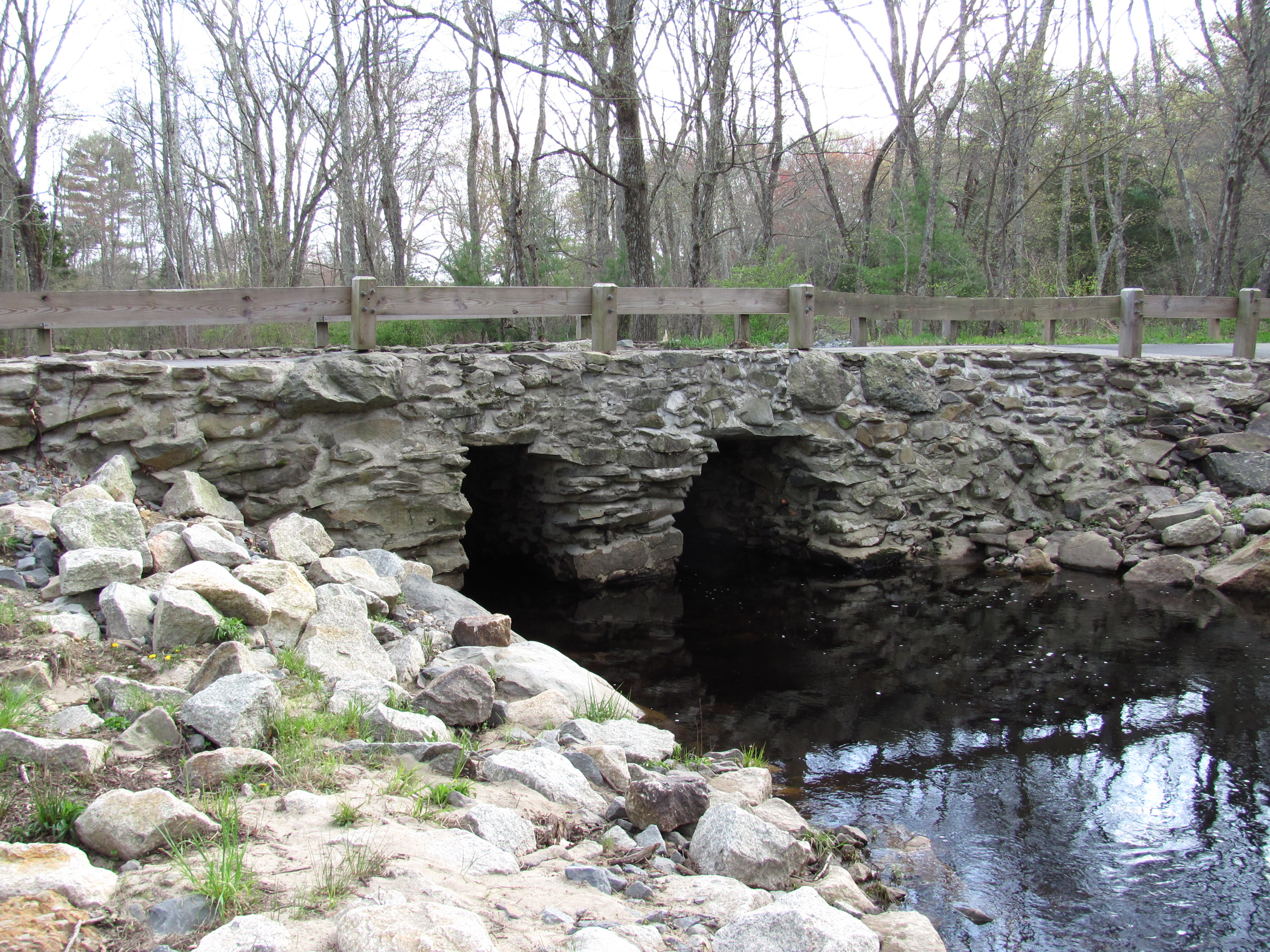
Carpenter Bridge over the West Branch

=== West branch ===
- Rehoboth
  - Fairfield Street
  - Ash Street
  - Homestead Avenue
  - Perryville Road
  - Danforth Street
  - Carpenter Street

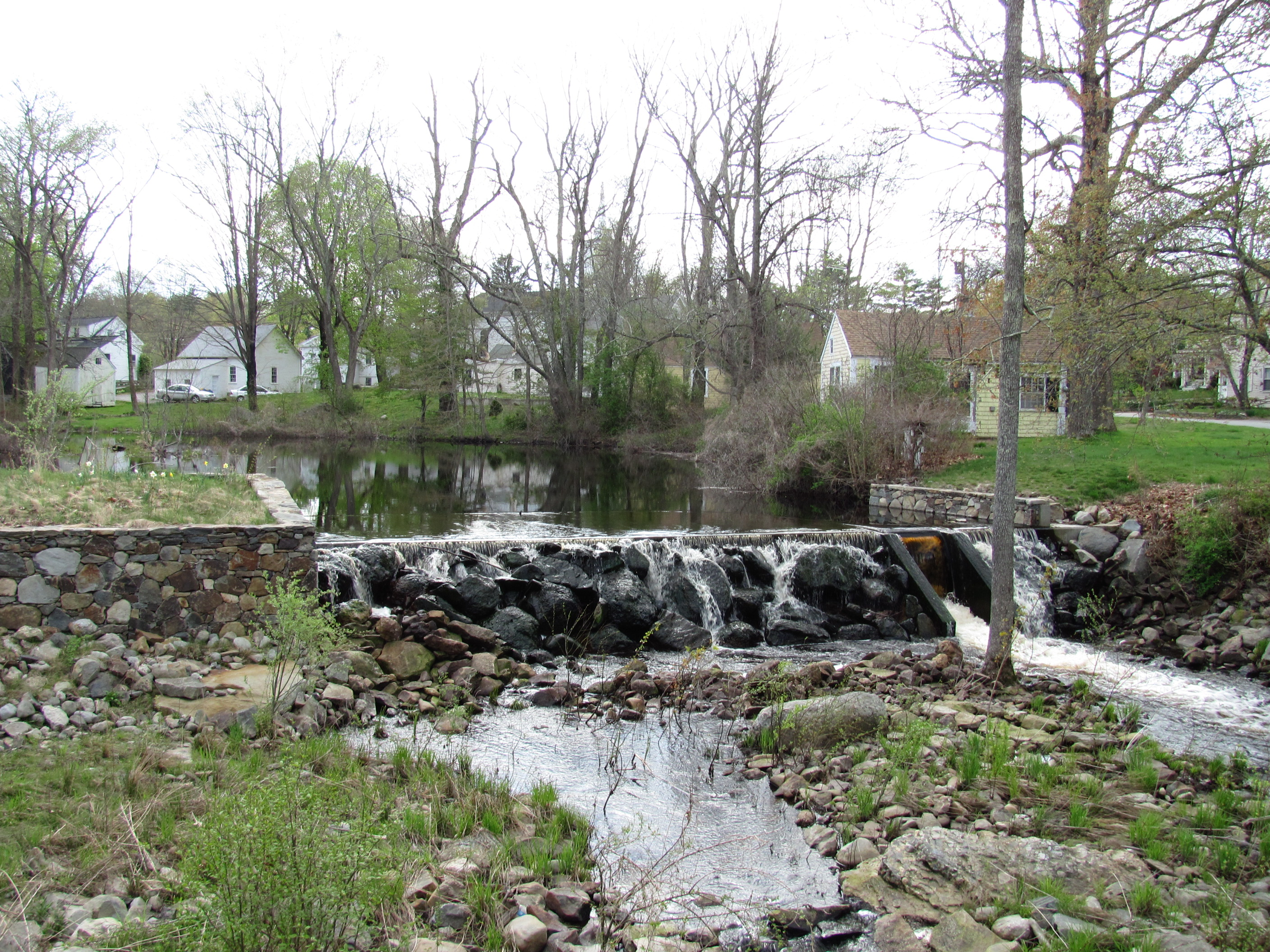
Village Pond on the East Branch

=== East branch ===
- Rehoboth
  - Fairview Avenue
  - Williams Street
  - Winthrop Street (U.S. 44)
  - Moulton Street (MA 118)
  - County Street (Twice)
  - Winthrop Street (U.S. 44)

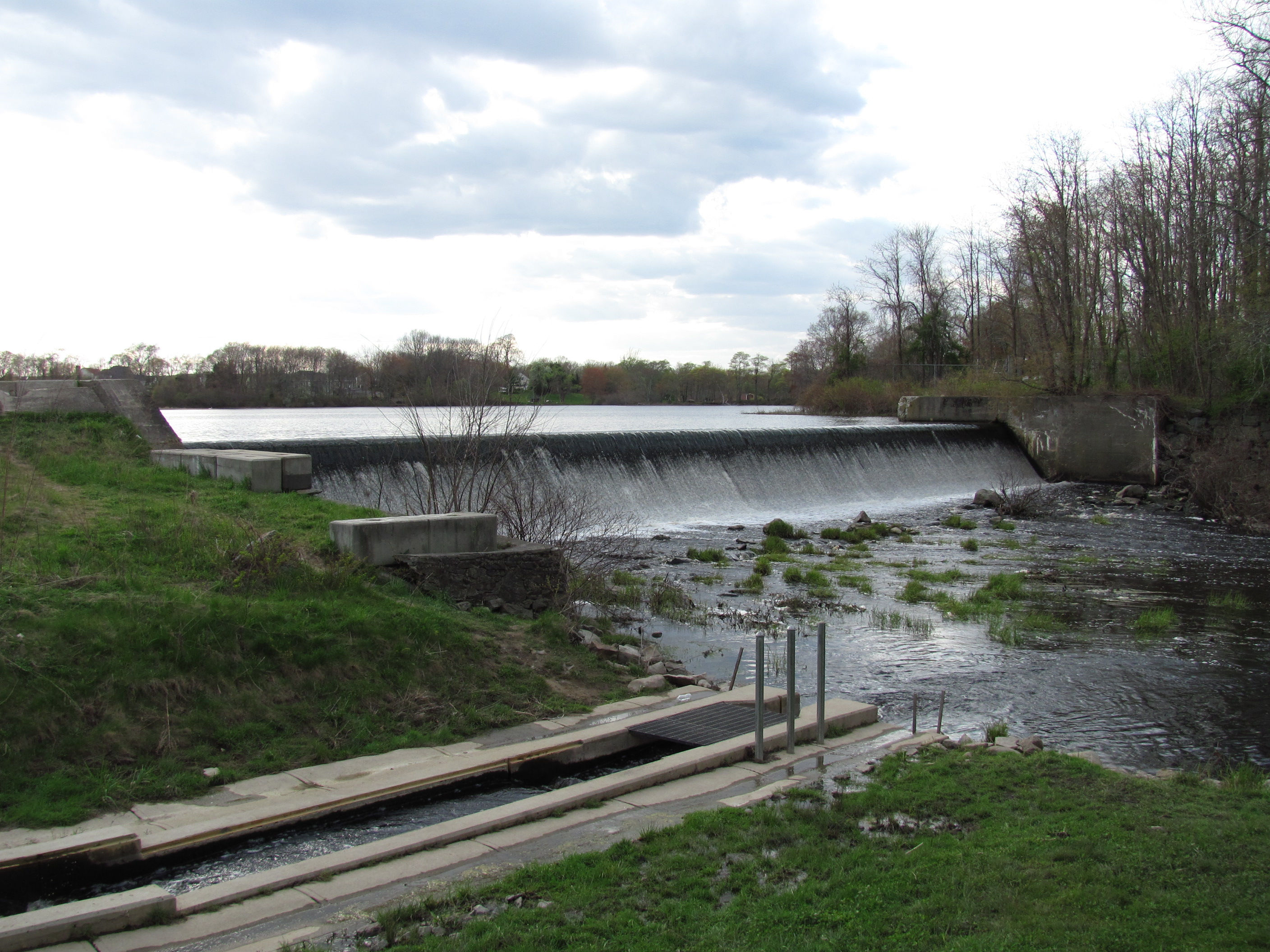
Shad Factory Pond Dam on the Main Branch

=== Main branch ===
- Rehoboth
  - Danforth Street
  - Winthrop Street (U.S. 44)
  - Wilmarth Bridge Road
  - Summer Street
  - Wheeler Street
  - Reed Street
  - Providence Street
  - Interstate 195
  - Fall River Avenue (U.S. 6)
- Swansea
  - Old Providence Road
- Barrington
  - County Road (RI 103/114)

== Tributaries ==
In addition to many unnamed tributaries, the following brooks feed the Palmer and its branches:

- Mine Brook (West Branch)
- Bliss Brook (West Branch)
- Wolf Plain Brook (West Branch)
- Carpenter Brook (West Branch)
- Roaring Brook (East Branch)
- Bad Luck Brook (East Branch)
- Rumney Marsh Brook
- Fullers Brook
- Rocky Run
- Torrey Creek

== Eponym ==
The river was probably named for Walter Palmer, one of the founders of Rehoboth.

== Depiction in art ==
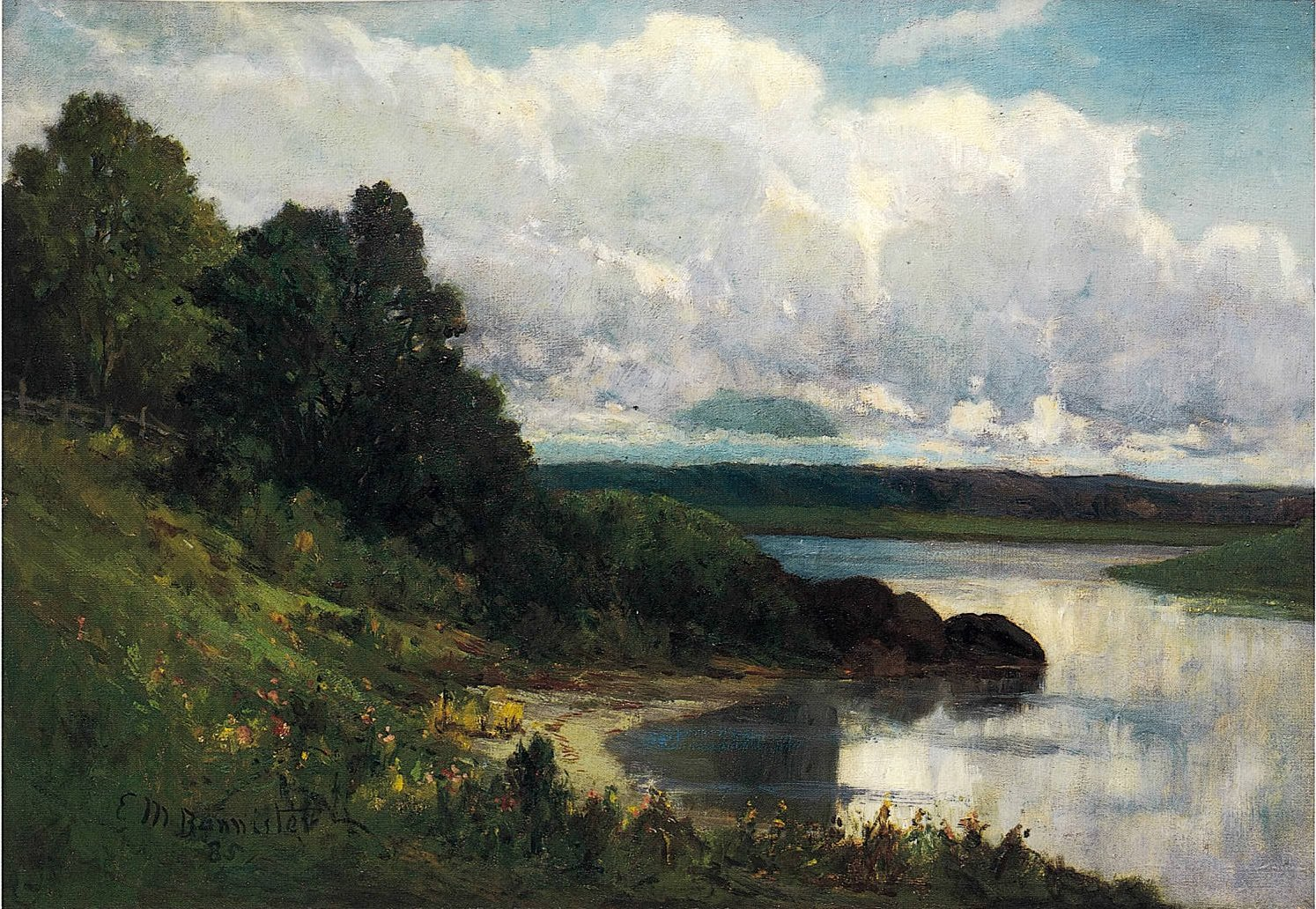
Bannister's depiction of the Palmer River

The Palmer River is a subject of an 1885 painting by local artist Edward Mitchell Bannister.

== See also ==
- List of rivers in Massachusetts
- List of rivers in Rhode Island
