= Seth Knapp Jr. House =

Historic house in Massachusetts, United States

- U.S. National Register of Historic Places
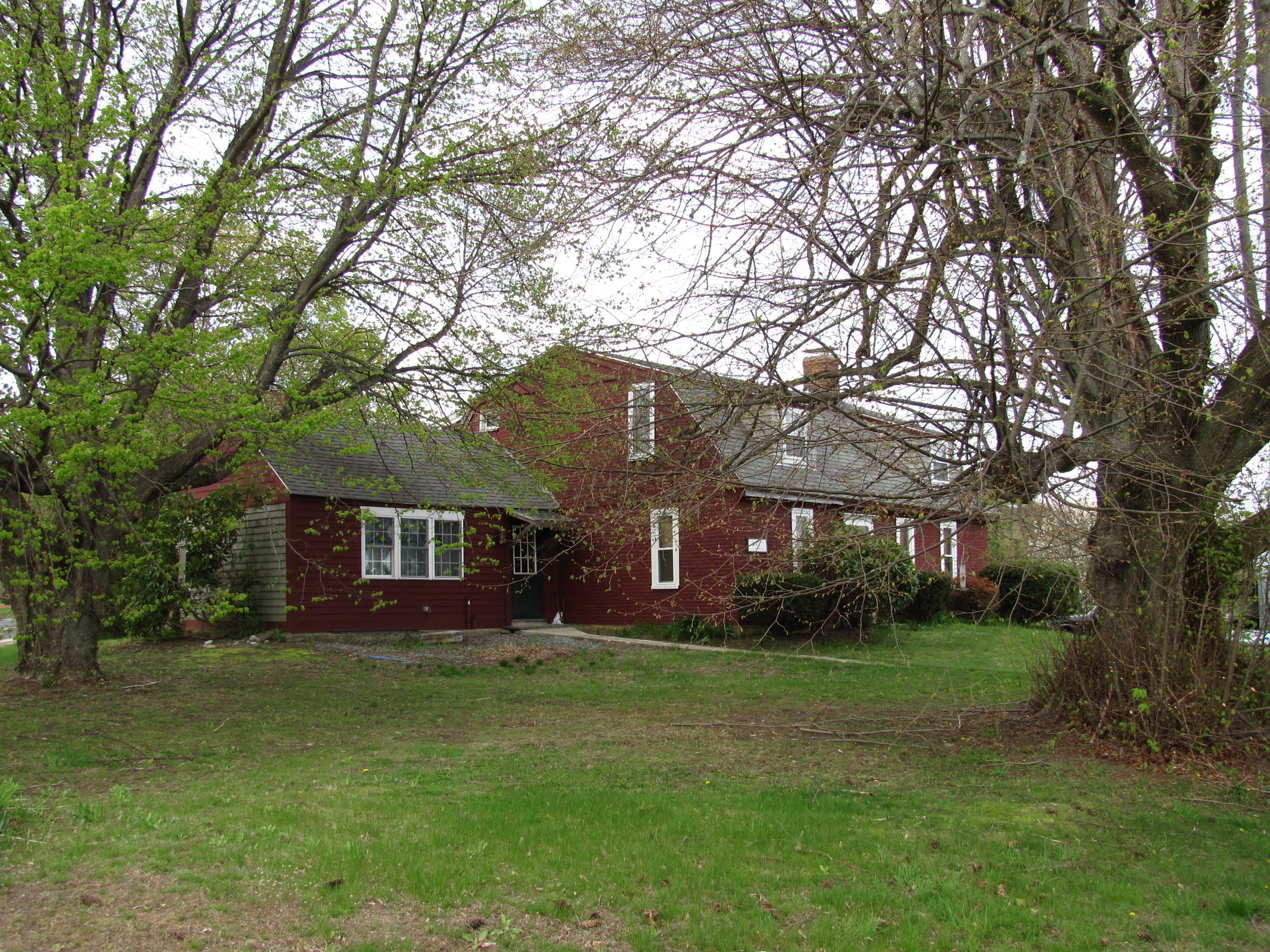
- Seth Knapp Jr. House

- Location within Massachusetts Location within the United States
- Location: 82 Water St., Rehoboth, Massachusetts
- Coordinates: 41°48′46″N 71°16′52″W
- Built: c. 1735
- Architectural style: Georgian
- MPS: Rehoboth MRA
- NRHP reference No.: 83000689
- Added to NRHP: June 6, 1983

The Seth Knapp Jr. House is a historic colonial American house located at 82 Water Street in Rehoboth, Massachusetts.

== Description and history ==
It is a two-story brick structure, with a gambrel roof pierced by gabled dormers, a four bay wide facade, and a central chimney. A single-story ell extends to the rear. The house was built in about 1735 for Ichabod Wood, and is locally significant as the only surviving pre-1850 brick house in the town. The bricks for the house were locally produced at a brickworks situated on the nearby Palmer River. Seth Knapp Jr., a later owner, made shoes on the property.

The house was listed on the National Register of Historic Places on June 6, 1983.

== See also ==
- National Register of Historic Places listings in Bristol County, Massachusetts
