= Rhode Island Route 136 =

State highway in Bristol County, Rhode Island, US

Route 136
- Route 136 highlighted in red

Route information
- Maintained by RIDOT
- Length: 7.4 mi (11.9 km)

Major junctions
- South end: Route 114 in Bristol
- North end: Route 136 at Swansea, MA

Location
- Country: United States
- State: Rhode Island
- Counties: Bristol

Highway system
- Rhode Island Routes
← Route 128	→ Route 138

Route 136 is a 7.4-mile-long (11.9 km) numbered state highway in the U.S. state of Rhode Island. Its southern terminus is at Route 114 in Bristol, and its northern terminus is at the Massachusetts border where it continues as Route 136.

== Route description ==
Route 136 takes the following route through the state:

- Bristol: 4.4 miles (7.1 km); Route 114 to Warren town line
  - Metacom Avenue
- Warren: 3.0 miles (4.8 km); Bristol town line to Massachusetts state line at Route 136
  - Metacom Avenue, Kickemuit Avenue, Arlington Avenue, and Market Street

== Major intersections ==
The entire route is in Bristol County.

Location	mi	km	Destinations	Notes
Bristol	0.0	0.0	Route 114 (Ferry Road)	Southern terminus
Warren	5.6	9.0	Route 103 (Child Street)	
Warren	7.6	12.2	Route 136 north – Swansea	Continuation into Massachusetts
1.000 mi = 1.609 km; 1.000 km = 0.621 mi
