= Massachusetts Route 136 =

State highway in Bristol County, Massachusetts, US

Route 136

Route information
- Maintained by MassDOT
- Length: 1.730 mi (2.784 km)
- Existed: 1933–present

Major junctions
- South end: Route 136 at the Rhode Island state line in Warren, RI
- US 6 in Swansea
- North end: I-195 in Swansea

Location
- Country: United States
- State: Massachusetts
- Counties: Bristol

Highway system
- Massachusetts State Highway System; Interstate; US; State
← Route 135	→ Route 137

Route 136 is a state highway in the U.S. state of Massachusetts. The highway runs 1.730 miles (2.784 km) from the Rhode Island state line north to Interstate 195 (I-195) in Swansea.

== Route description ==
Route 136 begins along two-lane market Market Street at the Rhode Island state line in the town of Swansea. Market Street continues south as Route 136 into Warren. The highway heads north and temporarily expands to a four-lane divided highway at its intersection with U.S. Route 6 (US 6, Grand Army of the Republic Highway), where the route's name becomes James Reynolds Road. Route 136 has a four-ramp partial cloverleaf interchange with I-195, then enters the town of Rehoboth as Kingsley Way. The state highway ends and continues as a town road at an arbitrary location between the town line and Davis Street to the north. Route 136 is a part of the National Highway System from its southern end to I-195.

== Junction list ==
The entire route is in Swansea, Bristol County.

mi	km	Destinations	Notes
0.000	0.000	Route 136 south (Market Street) – Warren, Newport	Continuation into Rhode Island
0.969	1.559	US 6 – Seekonk	
1.367	2.200	I-195 – Fall River, Cape Cod, Providence, RI	Exit 5 on I-195
1.730	2.784	Kingsley Way	Continuation north
1.000 mi = 1.609 km; 1.000 km = 0.621 mi
