= Carpenter Bridge (Massachusetts) =

- U.S. National Register of Historic Places
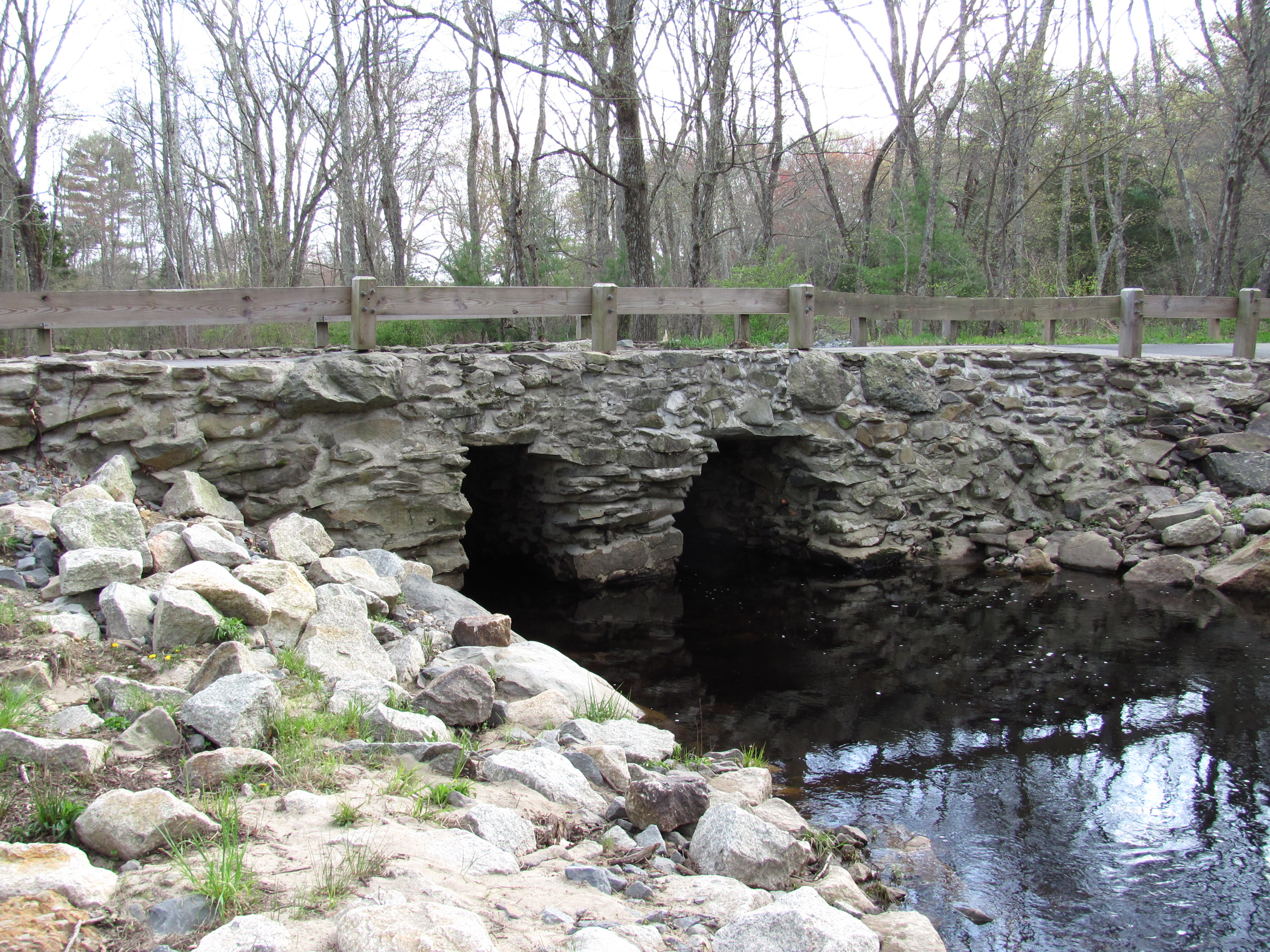
- Carpenter Bridge over the West Branch of the Palmer River

- Location within Massachusetts Location within the United States
- Location: Carpenter St. over west branch Rehoboth, Massachusetts
- Coordinates: 41°51′18″N 71°15′22″W
- Built: 1873
- Built by: William Lake
- Architectural style: Stone lintel
- MPS: Rehoboth MRA
- NRHP reference No.: 83000641
- Added to NRHP: June 6, 1983

The Carpenter Bridge is a historic bridge carrying Carpenter Street over the West Branch Palmer River in Rehoboth, Massachusetts. Built in 1873, it is the only surviving 19th-century stone bridge in the town. The bridge was listed on the National Register of Historic Places in 1983.

== Description and history ==
The Carpenter Bridge is located in central Rehoboth, in a rural area north of the town center. Carpenter Street runs roughly east–west between Danforth and Perryville Roads, crossing the West Branch Palmer River in its western third. There is a double span stone structure consisting of cap stones laid on two stone abutments and a central pier, all made of locally gathered fieldstone. The load-bearing cap stones are up to ten feet long, three feet wide, and eighteen inches thick, and the piers and abutments consist of dry-laid stone. The abutments are extended by low retaining walls for a short distance on either side, and the central piers upper tiers are flared to lengthen the bridge span. Layers of sand and gravel separate the bridge structure from the road surface.

In early colonial times, Carpenter Street was an Indian trail, whose route was eventually taken over by English colonists. The first bridge on the site was a wooden structure built about 1720, probably when the street was accepted as a town road. The present bridge was built as a replacement for that one in 1873. It was built at a cost of $218.15, of which $15 was for materials. The construction was done by the town's road crew, under the direction of William Lake. These types of bridges were built in some number to cross the town's many streams, most of which have since been replaced by modern culverts or concrete bridges.

== See also ==
- List of bridges on the National Register of Historic Places in Massachusetts
- National Register of Historic Places listings in Bristol County, Massachusetts
