= Massachusetts Route 103 =

State highway in Bristol County, Massachusetts, US

Route 103
- Route 103 highlighted in red

Route information
- Maintained by MassDOT
- Length: 4.92 mi (7.92 km)
- Existed: 1930–present

Major junctions
- West end: Route 103 at the Rhode Island state line in Warren, RI
- I-195 in Somerset
- East end: US 6 / Route 138 in Somerset

Location
- Country: United States
- State: Massachusetts
- Counties: Bristol

Highway system
- Massachusetts State Highway System; Interstate; US; State
← Route 102	→ Route 104

Route 103 is a 4.92-mile-long (7.92 km) east–west state highway in southeastern Massachusetts. It runs from the Rhode Island east to U.S. Route 6 (US 6) and Route 138 in Somerset.

== Route description ==
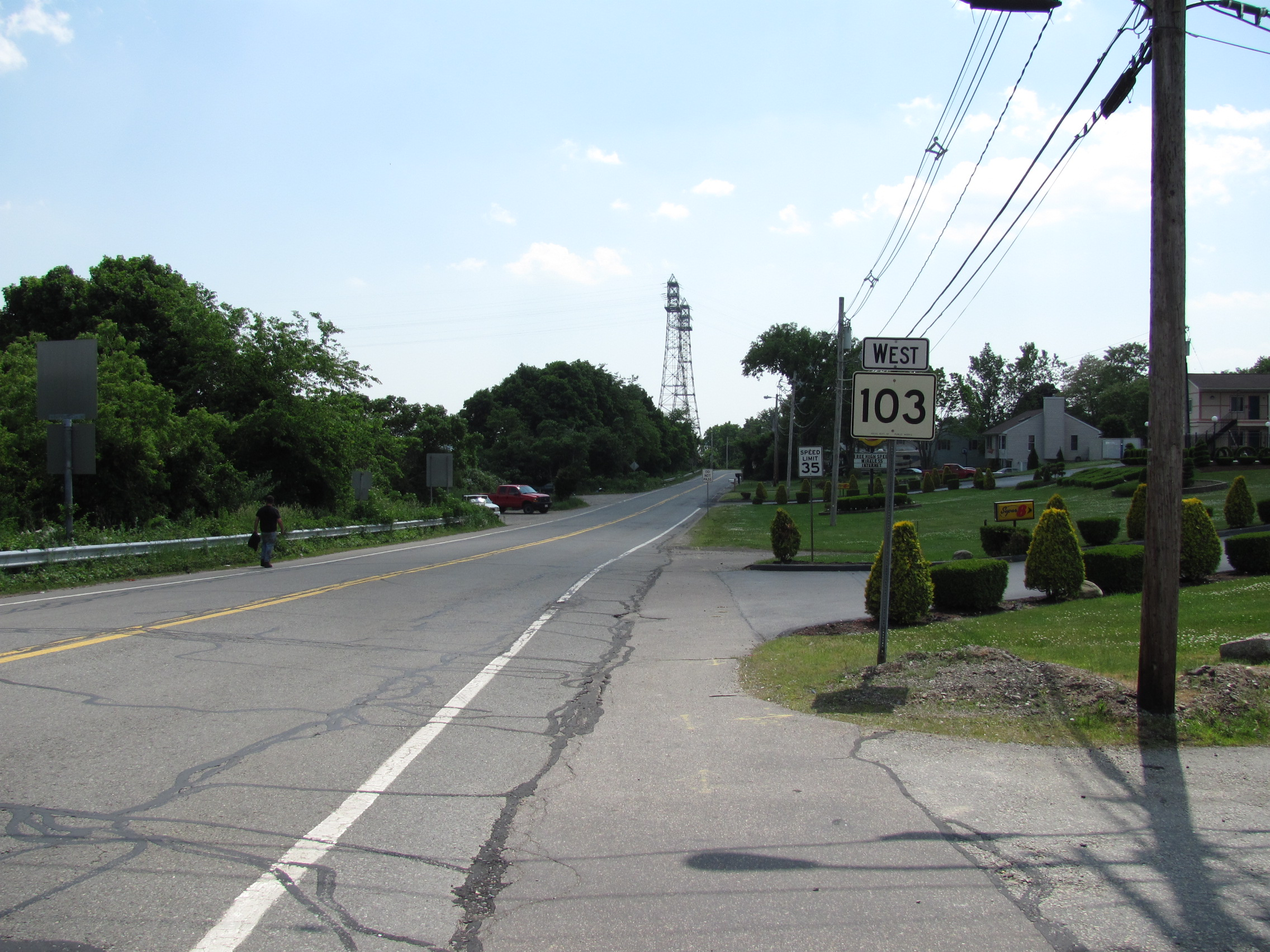
Route 103 westbound at US Route 6 in Somerset

Massachusetts Route 103 is a continuation of R.I. Route 103. It begins in Swansea at the Warren line, heading eastward as Wilbur Avenue. It crosses the Cole River before entering the village of Ocean Grove. As the route enters Somerset, it crosses the Lees River, just east of its junction with Exit 4 of I-195. (Part of the exit structure is linked to Lee's River Avenue, which ends at Route 103 near I-195.) Route 103 then continues eastward, north of Brayton Point and the Brayton Point Power Station. Route 103 follows Wilbur Avenue as it turns northward, intersecting at a small rotary with Riverside Avenue and Brayton Avenue, where all three roads formerly met the Slade's Ferry Bridge. Route 103 then continues northward along Riverside Avenue. Prior to 2011, its eastern terminus was Slade's Ferry Boulevard, the former alignment of U.S. Route 6 and Route 138 just west of the former Brightman Street Bridge, before US 6 and Route 138 were realigned to use the new Veterans' Memorial Bridge. After the opening of the new bridge, Route 103 was extended further alongside part of Riverside Avenue between the old and new bridges to end at a partial interchange between US 6 and Route 138. (Access to US 6 westbound and from US 6 eastbound is provided by using Slade's Ferry Boulevard and Brayton Avenue.)

Before the 1970 closure and removal of the Slade's Ferry Bridge, Route 103 traveled along that bridge, and ended in Fall River near an intersection of US 6 and Route 138.

== Major intersections ==
The entire route is in Bristol County.

Location	mi	km	Destinations	Notes
Swansea	0.00	0.00	Route 103 west – Warren, Barrington	Continuation into Rhode Island
Somerset	3.00	4.83	Lees River Avenue to I-195 west – Providence, RI	To I-195 exit 10
Somerset	3.20	5.15	I-195 – Fall River, Cape Cod, Providence, RI	Exit 10 on I-195, some movements through L.R. Avenue
Somerset	4.70	7.56	Brayton Avenue	Former location of the Slade's Ferry Bridge
Somerset	4.92	7.92	US 6 / Route 138 to Route 79 / I-195 – Fall River, Taunton, Tiverton, RI	Interchange, eastern terminus; access to US 6 westbound and from US 6 eastbound provided by using Slade's Ferry Boulevard and Brayton Avenue
1.000 mi = 1.609 km; 1.000 km = 0.621 mi: Closed/former; Incomplete access
