= U.S. Route 1A =

Highways in United States

U.S. Route 1A

Location
- Country: United States

Highway system
- United States Numbered Highway System; List; Special; Divided

U.S. Route 1A (US 1A) is the name of several highways found in the United States.

== North Carolina ==
=== Wake Forest–Youngsville ===
U.S. Highway 1A
- Location: Wake Forest–Youngsville
- Length: 9.0 mi (14.5 km)
- Existed: 1953–present

U.S. Highway 1A (US 1A) is a 9.0-mile (14.5 km) alternate route of US 1 through the towns of Wake Forest and Youngsville. While serving the downtown areas of both towns, the highway bypasses the primary commercial district of each. US 1A runs concurrently with North Carolina Highway 98 Business (NC 98 Bus.) along South Avenue in Wake Forest and NC 96 in Youngsville. US 1A was established in 1953 when US 1 was rerouted to bypass west of Wake Forest and Youngsville. The former alignment of US 1 became US 1A.

=== Franklinton ===
U.S. Highway 1A
- Location: Franklinton
- Length: 2.7 mi (4.3 km)
- Existed: 1953–present

U.S. Highway 1A (US 1A) was established in 1953 when US 1 was rerouted to bypass west Franklinton. A two-lane urban highway, it follows the old alignment through the downtown area, via Main Street. In November 2023, the American Association of State Highway and Transportation Officials approved a North Carolina Department of Transportation request to decommission the route.

== Connecticut ==
U.S. Route 1A
- Location: Stonington
- Length: 1.93 mi (3.11 km)
- Existed: 1941–present

U.S. Route 1A (US 1A) in Connecticut is a short loop route within the town of Stonington that passes through Stonington. US 1 originally went along this route until 1941. US 1A is the only surviving alternate U.S. Route in Connecticut.

The route is 1.93 miles (3.11 km) long and takes the following route: from US 1 to North Water Street, to Trumbull Avenue, to Alpha Avenue, then to Elm Street, and back to US 1.

Major intersections

The entire route is in Stonington, New London County.

mi	km	Destinations	Notes
0.00	0.00	US 1 (Stonington Road) to I-95	Western terminus
0.41	0.66	Lamberts Cove bridge	
1.93	3.11	US 1 (Stonington Road) to I-95 – Mystic, Westerly	Eastern terminus
1.000 mi = 1.609 km; 1.000 km = 0.621 mi

Browse numbered routes
← US 1	CT	→ Route 2

== Rhode Island ==
U.S. Route 1A
- Location: Warwick–Pawtucket
- Length: 15.2 mi (24.5 km)

U.S. Route 1A (US 1A) is a numbered U.S. Route running 15.2 miles (24.5 km) in the U.S. state of Rhode Island. It serves as a bypass of the downtown areas of Providence and Pawtucket, which US 1 goes through. US 1A is a lengthier route than the section of US 1 that it bypasses.

US 1A should not be confused with Route 1A. In Rhode Island, US 1A exists in two segments in Providence County connected by a mostly-unsigned concurrency with I-195, while Route 1A serves as a scenic alternate route of US 1 in Washington County. Not helping matters is the presence of Route 1A shields on US 1A.

Route description

US 1A runs for 1.7 miles (2.7 km) through Warwick along Post Road and Warwick Avenue. Then, in Cranston, it runs for another 1.7 miles (2.7 km) continuing along Warwick Avenue to Norwood Avenue and Narragansett Boulevard before crossing into Providence. There, the highway continues to follow Narragansett Boulevard and turns along Allens Avenue, Eddy Street, and Point Street. US 1A is not signed at all in Providence, but, in all likelihood (judging from the mistakenly placed Route 1A road signs), from Point Street, US 1A uses Water Street to enter I-195 eastbound at exit 1D. Similarly, US 1A southbound probably exits I-195 westbound at exit 1C onto South Main Street and turns left onto Point Street. The highway continues on the East Providence Expressway (Interstate 195 [I-195]) into East Providence. US 1A uses another one-way pairing with the eastbound traffic using the expressway and Warren and Pawtucket avenues. The opposite direction is routed along Pawtucket and Newport avenues. The last city through which US 1A runs is Pawtucket where it runs for 2.3 miles (3.7 km) to the Massachusetts state line in Attleboro, traveling concurrently with Route 1A on Newport Avenue to US 1.

History

US 1A is not a former alignment of US 1. In Warwick, US 1A formerly ran further north along Post Road east of Route 117 instead of turning north to overlap with the state road. It stayed with Post Road through Pawtuxet Village, then traveled north into Cranston on Broad Street to rejoin the current alignment at Norwood Avenue.

The southernmost section of the route, which exists on Post Road, was part of the Boston Post Road, a former mail route.

In 2022, one page on the Rhode Island Department of Transportation (RIDOT) website, dedicated to pavement resurfacing projects from 2022 to 2027, referred to part of US 1A (the stretch between US 1/Post Road and RI 117/Warwick Avenue) as RI 1A; it is unclear if US 1A has since been re-designated as a northern extension/section of RI 1A. (The paving project was completed in 2023). Since around this time, almost all signage along US 1A refers to the route as RI 1A. Despite this, two posts on Twitter refer to US 1A in Providence.

Major intersections

Exit numbers concurrent with I-195 converted to mileage-based exit numbering in 2020. The entire route is in Providence County.

Location	mi	km	Exit	Destinations	Notes
Warwick	0.0	0.0		US 1 (Post Road / Elmwood Avenue)	US 1 continues south as Post Road
Warwick	1.2	1.9		Route 117 west (Warwick Avenue)	Southern terminus of Route 117 concurrency
Cranston	2.1	3.4		Route 12 (Park Avenue) to I-95	
Cranston	2.5	4.0		Broad Street	Eastern terminus of Route 117
Providence	4.4	7.1		I-95 north to Route 10 / Route 146 / I-195 / US 6 / Thurbers Avenue	Exit 35 on I-95; Thurbers Avenue provides access from I-95 south
Providence	5.8	9.3	Point Street Bridge over the Providence River		
Providence	5.9	9.5		US 44 west (South Main Street) / Wickenden Street – Fox Point	Southern terminus of US 44 concurrency
Providence	6.4	10.3	1C	I-195 west / US 6 west to I-95 / Route 10 / Route 146 – Boston, New York	Southern terminus of I-195 / US 6 concurrency; southbound exit and northbound entrance
Providence	6.6	10.6	1D	Gano Street – India Point	Westbound exit and entrance
Seekonk River	6.7	10.8	Washington Bridge		
East Providence	6.8	10.9	1B-C	US 44 east (Taunton Avenue) – Riverside	Northern terminus of US 44 concurrency; northbound exit and southbound entrance
East Providence	7.0	11.3	1D	Route 103 east (Warren Avenue)	Northbound exit and southbound entrance; western terminus of Route 103
East Providence	7.7	12.4	2A	Warren Avenue (Route 103) / Broadway / Pawtucket Avenue – East Providence	Signed as exit 2 southbound; also signed for US 44 and Route 103 southbound
East Providence	8.4	13.5	2B	To Route 114 south (East Shore Expressway) – East Providence, Barrington	Eastbound exit and westbound entrance
East Providence	8.6	13.8	2C	I-195 east	Northern terminus of I-195 concurrency
East Providence	8.7	14.0		US 6 east (Warren Avenue) – Seekonk, MA	Northern terminus of US 6 concurrency
East Providence	9.0	14.5		Route 103 / Route 114 south to I-195 east	Southern terminus of Route 114 concurrency
East Providence	9.8	15.8		US 44 (Taunton Avenue)	
East Providence	10.7	17.2		Route 114A south	Northern terminus of Route 114A
East Providence	11.3	18.2		Route 152 (Newman Avenue)	Southern terminus of Route 152.
East Providence	11.8	19.0		Route 114 north (Pawtucket Avenue)	Northern terminus of Route 114 concurrency
Pawtucket	14.0	22.5		Route 15 (Armistice Boulevard)	
Pawtucket	15.2	24.5		Route 1A north – Attleboro	Continuation into Massachusetts
1.000 mi = 1.609 km; 1.000 km = 0.621 mi: Concurrency terminus; Incomplete access

Browse numbered routes
← US 1	RI	→ Route 1A

== Maine ==
=== York ===
U.S. Route 1A
- Location: York
- Length: 7.0 mi (11.3 km)

U.S. Route 1A (US 1A) in York travels along the coast and serves the areas of York Harbor, York Beach, and Cape Neddick. The length of this segment is 7.0 miles (11.3 km).

=== Portland ===
U.S. Route 1A
- Location: Portland

U.S. Route 1A (US 1A)'s original routing in Portland, Maine's largest city, has largely been eliminated, but a short section still exists mainly along Portland's waterfront. It now begins at exit 7 on the I-295 freeway (also known as Franklin Street). It travels southeast along the Franklin Street Arterial until its intersection with Commercial Street and the Maine State Pier in the Old Port. At this point, it makes a 90-degree turn onto Commercial Street, which it will follow through the entire waterfront area, passing such landmarks as Becky's Diner and the U.S. Customs Service Portland office. It then passes under the four-lane State Route 77 (SR 77)/Casco Bay Bridge roadway and then continues along Commercial Street (and the waterfront) until its intersection with Valley Street and the Veteran's Memorial Bridge. US 1A follows neither routing but instead turns west and north following the Fore River Parkway, on which it loops back to meet I-295 again at the exit 5 interchange, which also serves Congress Street (SR 22).

=== Rockland ===
U.S. Route 1A
- Location: Rockland

U.S. Route 1A (US 1A) in Rockland bypasses the downtown area and begins at the intersection of Camden and Maverick streets. Traveling westbound along Maverick Street, it passes Rockland Plaza (which is Rockland's second shopping center) and is concurrent with SR 17 along this section. It then takes a 90-degree turn at a flashing yellow blinker light to turn left (south) onto Birch Street where it meets North Main Street (which was the former alignment of SR 17) at a traffic light. US 1A then continues along Broadway, passing Oceanside High School as it continues south through the residential heart of Rockland, and encounters additional traffic lights at Rankin and Limerock streets, until its end at a traffic light at Park Street where it rejoins US 1.

=== Bangor ===
U.S. Route 1A
- Location: Stockton Springs–Ellsworth
- Length: 54.0 mi (86.9 km)

U.S. Route 1A (US 1A) in Bangor is a loop route off US 1, serving the Bangor metropolitan area. The route is 54.0 miles (86.9 km) long and runs from Stockton Springs to Ellsworth. US 1A enters Bangor from the southwest by following the west bank of the Penobscot River through the towns of Winterport and Hampden. US 1A crosses the Joshua Chamberlain Bridge from downtown Bangor into the city of Brewer and continues southeast through Holden and Dedham to Ellsworth. This route follows the former alignment of US 1, prior to US 1's relocation after construction of the Waldo–Hancock Bridge. US 1A signage on this portion lacks directional indicators.

=== Milbridge ===
U.S. Route 1A
- Location: Milbridge
- Length: 7.8 mi (12.6 km)

U.S. Route 1A (US 1A) in Milbridge provides a more direct route for through travelers, as it branches off from US 1 just north of the main business section of the small town of Milbridge, and is known as Bridge Street. It then crosses the Narraguagus River and continues in a northeasterly direction whereas US 1 takes a route that is north-northwest to meet Cherryfield before turning back east while US 1A takes the more direct (and southern) route closer to the coast to rejoin its parent just east of Harrington. The length of this segment is 7.8 miles (12.6 km).

=== Whitneyville ===
U.S. Route 1A
- Location: Whitneyville
- Length: 8.1 mi (13.0 km)

U.S. Route 1A (US 1A) runs 8.1 miles (13.0 km) between Jonesboro and Machias via the village of Whitneyville.

=== Aroostook County ===
U.S. Route 1A
- Location: Aroostook County
- Length: 49.8 mi (80.1 km)

U.S. Route 1A (US 1A) in Aroostook County runs 49.8 miles (80.1 km), from Mars Hill to Van Buren. US 1A runs parallel to the Canadian border, as US 1 goes through the cities of Presque Isle and Caribou. Major towns along US 1A include Fort Fairfield and Limestone.

The section north of Fort Fairfield to Van Buren was once SR 165 but is no longer a numbered highway in Maine.

Browse numbered routes
← US 1	ME	→ US 2
← SR 164		→ SR 166

== Former routes ==
=== Southern Pines, North Carolina ===
U.S. Highway 1A
- Location: Southern Pines, North Carolina
- Existed: 1957–1962

U.S. Highway 1A (US 1A) was established around 1957, replacing the old mainline US 1 through Southern Pines, North Carolina, via May Street. It was decommissioned by 1962.

=== Sanford, North Carolina ===
U.S. Highway 1A
- Location: Sanford, North Carolina
- Length: 6.5 mi (10.5 km)
- Existed: 1957–1960

U.S. Highway 1A (US 1A) was established around 1957, replacing the old mainline US 1 through downtown Sanford, North Carolina, via Carthage Street and Hawkins Avenue. It was renumbered in 1960 as US 1 Bus.

=== Cary–Raleigh, North Carolina ===
U.S. Highway 1A
- Location: Cary–Raleigh, North Carolina
- Existed: 1933–1935

U.S. Highway 1A (US 1A) may have appeared in 1933 as a second route between Cary and Raleigh, North Carolina; it was cosigned with US 70 on Western Boulevard. Maps cease showing the route by 1936.

=== Raleigh, North Carolina 1 ===
U.S. Highway 1A
- Location: Raleigh, North Carolina
- Existed: 1946–1948

The first U.S. Highway 1A (US 1A) in Raleigh, North Carolina, was established in 1946 as new routing along Louisburg Road (cosigned with NC 59), then along new road (today's Capital Boulevard) back to Wake Forest Road. In 1948, US 1 and US 1A switched routes.

=== Raleigh, North Carolina 2 ===
U.S. Highway 1A
- Location: Raleigh, North Carolina
- Existed: 1948–1957

The second U.S. Highway 1A (US 1A) in Raleigh, North Carolina, was established in 1948 as a route switch with mainline US 1 onto Wake Forest Boulevard. It was decommissioned by 1957.

=== Henderson, North Carolina ===
U.S. Highway 1A
- Location: Henderson, North Carolina
- Length: 10.6 mi (17.1 km)
- Existed: 1957–1960

U.S. Highway 1A (US 1A) was established around 1957, replacing the old mainline US 1 through Gill and downtown Henderson, North Carolina, via Raleigh Road and Garnett Street. It was renumbered in 1960 as US 1 Bus.

=== Port Chester, New York ===
U.S. Route 1A
- Location: Port Chester, New York

U.S. Route 1A (US 1A) in Port Chester, New York, was routed along King Street, Willet Avenue (County Route 43), Putnam Avenue (New York State Route 982C), and Hillside Avenue.

=== Stamford, Connecticut ===
U.S. Route 1A
- Location: Stamford, Connecticut
- Existed: 1938–1960s

U.S. Route 1A (US 1A) was an alternate route in Stamford, Connecticut. Prior to the redevelopment of Downtown Stamford in the 1960s, US 1 originally followed West Main Street across the Mill River bridge onto Main Street and along East Main Street. After the redevelopment, the Main Street portion of US 1 was routed onto the newly created Tresser Boulevard and its accompanying bridge crossing the river.

As of 1938, US 1A in Stamford was signed from West Main Street (US 1) along Richmond Hill Avenue across the river, South Street, State Street north along the railroad tracks, Elm Street under the railroad tracks, and Magee Avenue to East Main Street (US 1).

=== Darien, Connecticut ===
U.S. Route 1A
- Location: Darien, Connecticut

U.S. Route 1A (US 1A) in Darien, Connecticut, was the current US 1 alignment. In the early 1950s, a four-lane divided highway was constructed to relieve congestion in the area. US 1 was assigned to this new highway section with the old road becoming US 1A. The highway section was later incorporated into the Connecticut Turnpike and eventually became I-95. US 1 was redesignated on the old alignment.

=== Norwalk, Connecticut ===
U.S. Route 1A
- Location: Norwalk, Connecticut

U.S. Route 1A (US 1A) in Norwalk, Connecticut, was routed along Belden Avenue, Cross Street, and North Avenue. US 1 was originally assigned to West Street, Wall Street, and East Avenue. Since the opening of the US 7 expressway, US 1 was moved to its current alignment along part of this US 1A along Riverside Avenue, Cross Street, and North Avenue. The original US 1 alignment is now town-maintained.

=== Bridgeport, Connecticut ===
U.S. Route 1A
- Location: Bridgeport, Connecticut
- Existed: 1963

U.S. Route 1A (US 1A) in Bridgeport, Connecticut, was the current US 1 alignment along Kings Highway Cutoff, North Avenue, Boston Avenue, and Barnum Avenue. This US 1A existed until 1963. US 1 originally went along modern Route 130 on Fairfield Avenue, State Street, Stratford Avenue, and Ferry Boulevard connecting the towns of Fairfield and Stratford via downtown Bridgeport.

=== Milford, Connecticut ===
U.S. Route 1A
- Location: Milford, Connecticut
- Existed: c. 1942

U.S. Route 1A (US 1A) in Milford, Connecticut, was designated current US 1 (Boston Post Road). US 1 originally went along Broad, River, and Cherry streets. In 1940, the two alignments were swapped. US 1A remained on Broad Street/River Street/Cherry Street until about 1942. Broad Street is now part of Route 162 while River and Cherry streets are now town-maintained roads.

=== East Haven, Connecticut ===
U.S. Route 1A
- Location: East Haven, Connecticut
- Existed: early 1950s

U.S. Route 1A (US 1A) in East Haven, Connecticut, was routed along Main Street. This was the original alignment of US 1 until the opening of the Saltonstall Parkway in 1941, which was designated as US 1. This US 1A existed until the early 1950s. The eastern end of Main Street is now part of Route 100.

=== Branford, Connecticut ===
U.S. Route 1A
- Location: Branford, Connecticut
- Existed: 1937–1963

U.S. Route 1A (US 1A) in Branford, Connecticut, from 1937 to 1940 was designated as current US 1 on North Main Street. US 1 originally went along Main and East Main streets. The routes were swapped around 1940 and US 1A remained on this alignment until 1963. Main Street is now part of Route 146 while East Main Street is a town-maintained road.

=== Old Saybrook, Connecticut ===
U.S. Route 1A
- Location: Old Saybrook, Connecticut
- Existed: early 1970s

U.S. Route 1A (US 1A) in Old Saybrook, Connecticut, was designated on the current US 1 alignment on Boston Post Road. US 1 originally went to the town center using Old Boston Post Road then Main Street (now part of Route 154). The two routes were swapped around 1940. US 1A on Old Boston Post Road remained until the early 1970s.

=== Waterford, Connecticut ===
U.S. Route 1A
- Location: Waterford, Connecticut
- Existed: 1948–1975

U.S. Route 1A (US 1A) in Waterford, Connecticut, in late 1948 was designated on the old US 1 alignment while US 1 was assigned as an expressway section between the Raymond E. Baldwin Bridge in Old Lyme and the Gold Star Memorial Bridge in New London in late 1948. The US 1 expressway later became part of the Connecticut Turnpike and I-95. The US 1 designation was removed from the expressway in 1975 and reverted to its old surface alignment.

=== Groton, Connecticut ===
U.S. Route 1A
- Location: Groton, Connecticut

U.S. Route 1A (US 1A) in Groton, Connecticut, was routes along Long Hill Road from the I-95 exit 85 offramp to Poquonnock Road. This was a newly constructed road in 1938 which later became US 1 by 1941. The original US 1 alignment used Thames Street and Poquonnock Road going through the old borough of Groton (now the city Groton).
