= Interstate 195 (Rhode Island–Massachusetts) =

Highway in Rhode Island and Massachusetts

Interstate 195
- I-195 highlighted in red

Route information
- Auxiliary route of I-95
- Maintained by RIDOT and MassDOT
- Length: 44.5 mi (71.6 km)
- Existed: 1959–present
- NHS: Entire route

Major junctions
- West end: I-95 / US 6 in Providence, RI
- US 44 / US 1A in Providence, RI; US 6 / US 1A in East Providence, RI; US 6 in Swansea, MA; Route 79 / Route 138 in Fall River, MA; Route 24 in Fall River, MA; Route 140 in New Bedford, MA; Route 18 in New Bedford, MA
- East end: I-495 / Route 25 in Wareham, MA

Location
- Country: United States
- States: Rhode Island, Massachusetts
- Counties: RI: Providence; MA: Bristol, Plymouth

Highway system
- Interstate Highway System; Main; Auxiliary; Suffixed; Business; Future
- Rhode Island Routes
- Massachusetts State Highway System; Interstate; US; State
← I-184	RI	→ Route 195
← Route 193	MA	→ Route 197
← I-95	I-95E, RI	→ Route 96
← I-95	I-95E, MA	→ Route 96

Interstate 195 (I-195) is an auxiliary Interstate Highway running a combined 44.55 miles (71.70 km) in the US states of Rhode Island and Massachusetts. It travels from a junction with I-95 in Providence, Rhode Island, east to a junction with I-495 and Massachusetts Route 25 in Wareham, Massachusetts. It runs east–west and crosses Southeastern Massachusetts, passing through the cities of Fall River, Massachusetts, and New Bedford, Massachusetts. The portion of I-195 in East Providence is also known as the East Providence Expressway.

I-195 provides a direct highway route to Cape Cod from Rhode Island and, via I-95, from New York and Connecticut as well.

== Route description ==
Lengths
	mi	km
RI	3.82	6.15
MA	40.73	65.55
Total	44.55	71.70

=== Rhode Island ===
I-195 begins at I-95 at a semi-directional T interchange, which along with a new bridge over the Providence River, was part of the large Iway construction project. At this point, US Route 6 (US 6) is also signed along I-195. The complex Iway interchange includes several ramps for local streets (labeled exits 1A and 1B) and an interchange with I-95, which is unnumbered. US 44 and US 1A join at the next interchange with Gano and Main streets, labeled exits 1C, 1D, and 1E. The road crosses the Washington Bridge over the Seekonk River into East Providence. US 44 leaves the freeway at exit 1C in East Providence. Exit 1D is a partial interchange with Route 103 while exit 2A provides access to several local streets in East Providence. Exits 2B and 2C provide access to Route 114, which is also where US 6 and US 1A leave the freeway. I-195 then leaves Rhode Island, having gone 3.82 miles (6.15 km).

=== Massachusetts ===
I-195 enters Seekonk, Massachusetts, and interchanges with Route 114A at exit 1. There are two interchanges in Swansea, exit 5 for Route 136 and exit 8 for US 6. Access to the town of Somerset and the village of Ocean Grove in Swansea is via exit 10 (Route 103). I-195 crosses the Charles M. Braga Jr. Memorial Bridge over the Taunton River, entering Fall River. The bridge passes over Battleship Cove and USS Massachusetts, after which exit 11 provides access to Route 79 and Route 138. Exits 12 and 13 provide access to downtown Fall River streets, while a brief concurrency with Route 24 exists between exits 14A (Route 24 south) and 14B (Route 24 north). Passing the Watuppa Ponds, I-195 enters Westport, where exit 15 is a partial interchange with Sanford Road, and exit 16 marks the northern terminus of Route 88. Exits 19 and 22 provide access to local roads in Dartmouth, while, shortly after entering the port city of New Bedford, there is a full cloverleaf interchange with the Route 140 freeway (exits 24A and 24B). Exits 25 to 29 are partial interchanges with several local New Bedford city streets. A bridge over the Acushnet River takes I-195 to the town of Fairhaven, where there is the northern terminus of Route 240 freeway at exit 29. Exit 31 is for North Street in Mattapoisett, exit 35 is Route 105 in Marion, and exit 39 is Route 28 in Wareham. I-195 ends at trumpet interchange with I-495 (exit 40B) and Route 25 (exit 40A) in Wareham, having 40.73 miles (65.55 km) in Massachusetts.

== History ==
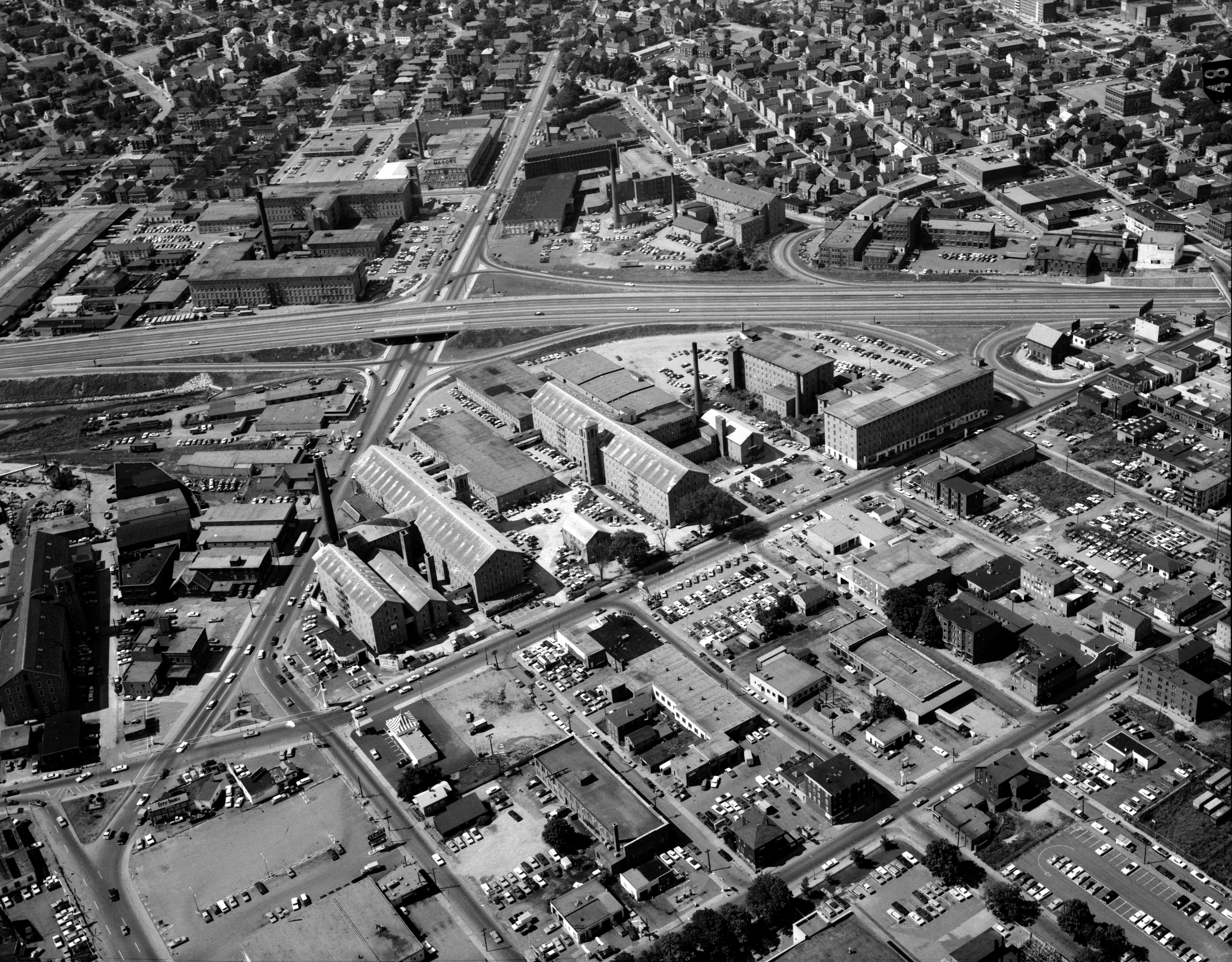
I-195 in Fall River, photo from 1968

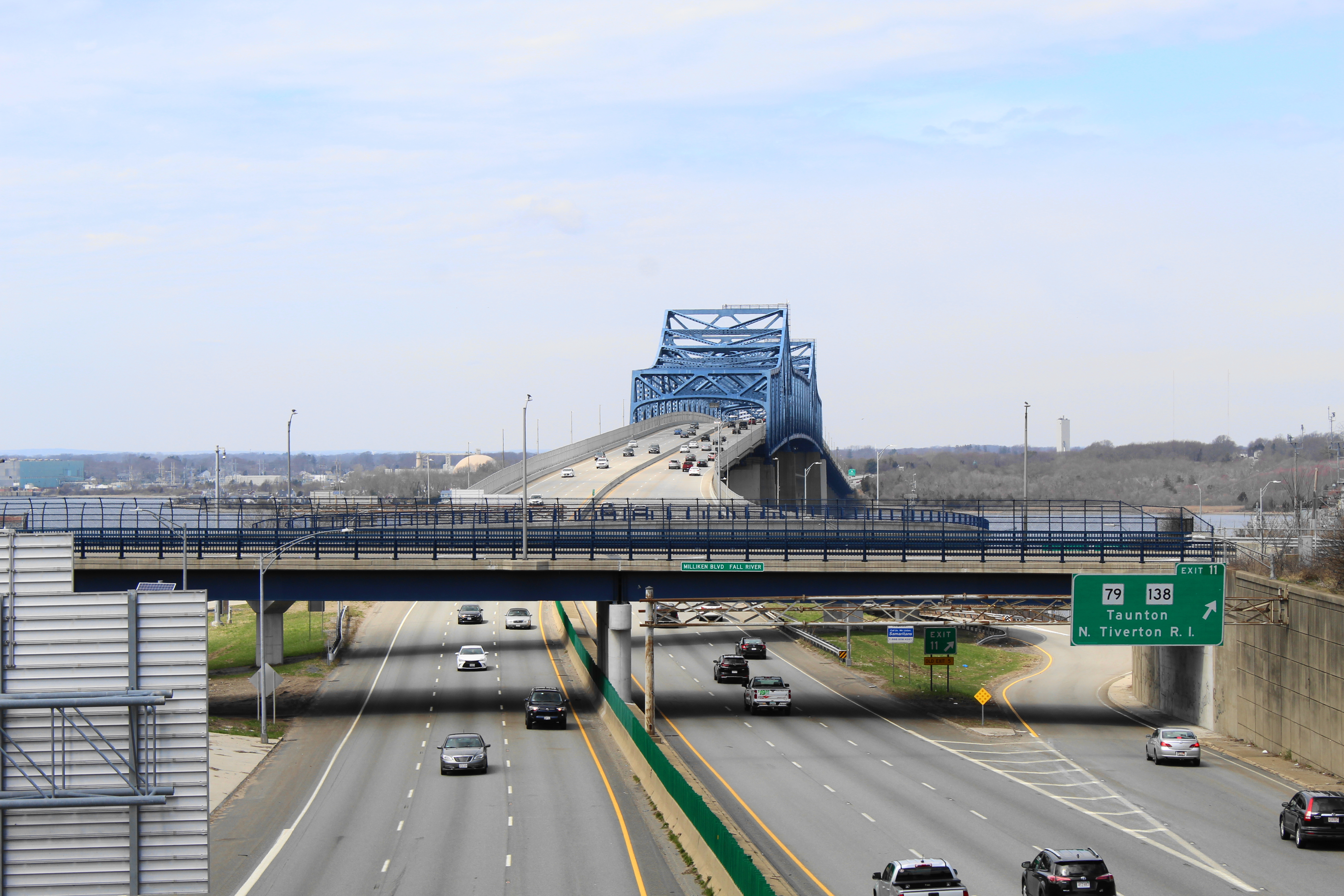
I-195 approaching the Braga Bridge in downtown Fall River

Predating I-195 were two sections of road—Fox Point Boulevard and the Washington Bridge. The Washington Bridge, crossing the Seekonk River between Providence and East Providence, was opened on September 25, 1930, replacing an 1885 swing bridge with a higher bascule bridge. A new westbound bridge opened in November 1968.

Fox Point Boulevard, later George M. Cohan Boulevard, was a surface boulevard connecting the Washington Bridge west to the Point Street Bridge and Downtown, Providence. It was built with no cross traffic by using U-turn ramps in the median to reverse direction. This was the last part in Providence to be built as a freeway, opened in December 1968.

The first freeway section came off the west end of Cohan Boulevard and over the Providence River, ending at the one-way pair of Pine and Friendship streets, which opened in November 1958. The ramp to Pine Street has been closed, but the entrance from Friendship Street still remained open until the mid-2000s. The I-95 interchange at this end opened in fall 1964; the Pine Street ramp was kept for a while.

The next section to be constructed was the part in East Providence. It opened to the last exit before the state line on December 15, 1959, and was extended into Massachusetts by August 1960.

I-195 cut through the center of Watchemoket Square, which, about 30 years earlier, was the heart of downtown East Providence but was on the decline in the 1950s. Half of the square was demolished to make way for the highway.

Before the Interstate Highway System numbering was decided upon, I-195 was planned as a relocation of US 6; in fact, all but the last section was signed as US 6 when built (the first section only eastbound though). In 1957, the number Interstate 95E (I-95E) was assigned, as all intercity routes were numbered before the auxiliary Interstate numbering was chosen, and the Providence–New Bedford, Massachusetts, route was too long to be considered intracity. The I-195 designation was assigned in 1959 with the final numbering. At some time after 1976, the definition of I-195 was extended east to I-495 (which was itself extended).

I-195 still carries US 6, now in both directions, from I-95 to the last interchange before Massachusetts. It also carries US 1A and US 44 over the Washington Bridge and its approaches, though the former has almost no signs. The Rhode Island Department of Transportation (RIDOT) started reconstructing the westbound Washington Bridge in October 2021, following years of delays.

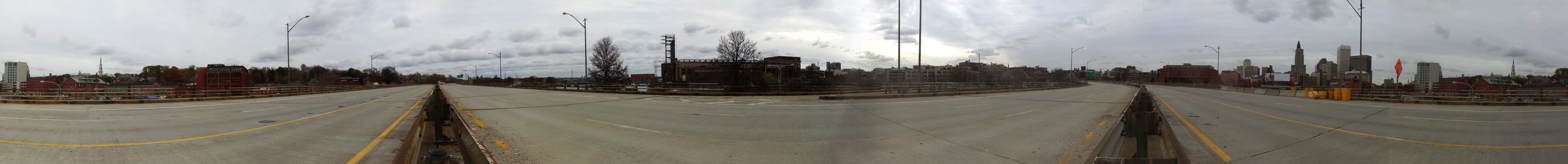
The Providence River Bridge carried traffic across the Providence River, to its western terminus with I-95. It was demolished in 2010–2011 due to realignment of I-195. The Van Leesten pedestrian bridge opened in its place in 2019.

=== Iway ===
Iway
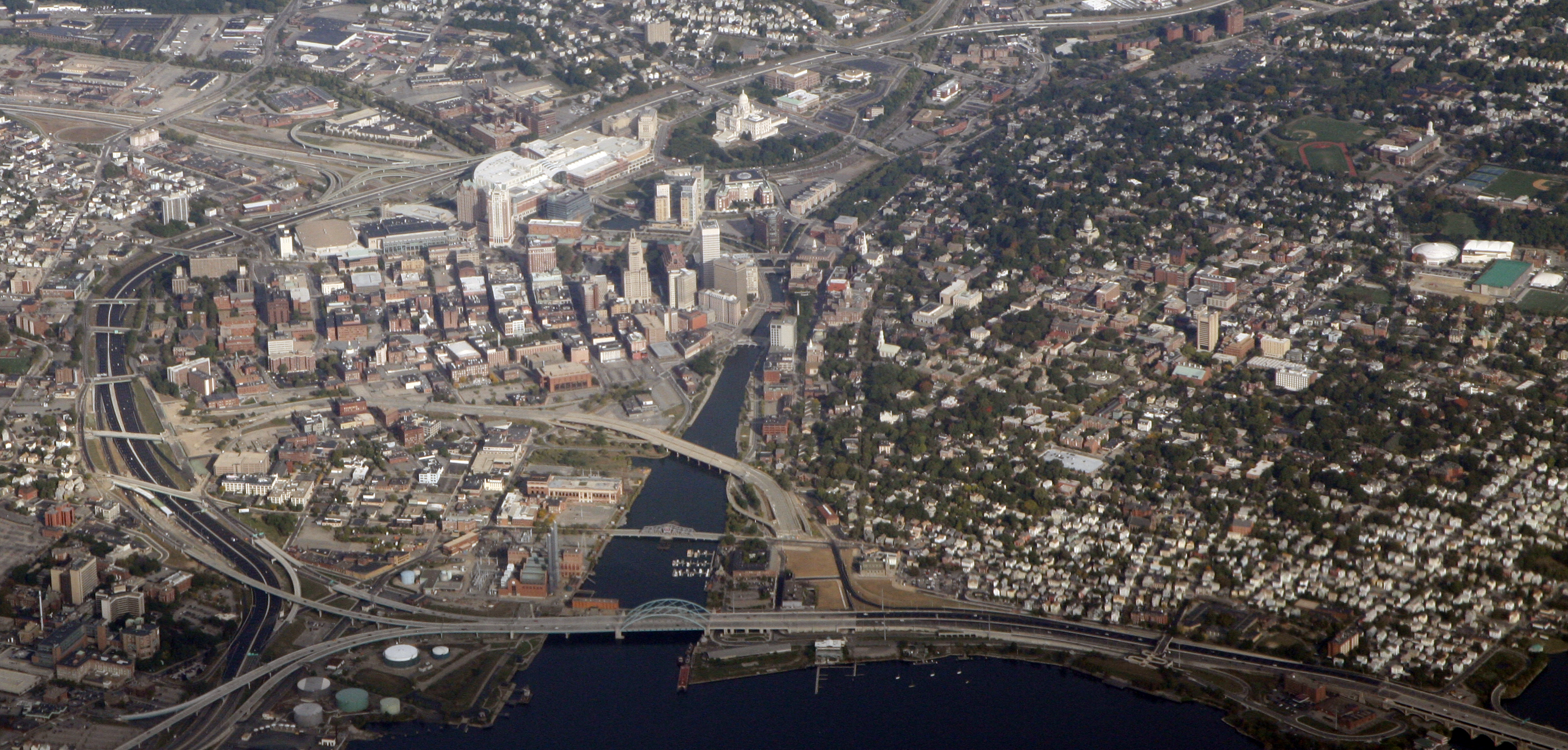
- The rerouted I-195 in downtown Providence runs over the newly completed bridge at bottom, further away from the downtown core. The missing section of the old I-195, right of the Providence River, marks the beginning of the previous highway's demolition.
- Coordinates: 41°48′45″N 71°21′31″W
- Carries: Motor vehicles
- Crosses: Providence River
- Locale: Providence, Rhode Island, US
- Maintained by: RIDOT
- Website: www.fhwa.dot.gov/ipd/project_profiles/ri_iway.aspx

Characteristics
- No. of lanes: 8

History
- Construction end: 2010
- Construction cost: $610 million (equivalent to $854 million in 2024)
- Opened: 2007

Location
- Interactive map of Iway

A before and after map of the project

I-195's stretch through Providence was reconstructed with a $610-million (equivalent to $854 million in 2024) project by RIDOT to relocate the I-195 and I-95 interchange. The relocation made the segment safer for traffic, reunified the Jewelry District with Downtown, and freed up more space. In the process, some 35 buildings, housing over 80 businesses and six residences, were demolished. The new stretch of highway is called the Iway by RIDOT and includes a signature bridge over the Providence River as well as a landscaped pedestrian walkway over the highway. It connects India Point Park to the Fox Point neighborhood. It involved renovating India Point Park and constructing a 50-foot-wide (15 m) pedestrian bridge; building a signature arch bridge over the Providence River; and improved highway flow, access, and safety, as the original interchange was not built for modern traffic standards. The previous lane alignment was dangerous and created congestion, as lane shifts were often required to avoid a left exit; moreover, the concrete supports had deteriorated to the point that steel shoring were needed to reinforce the interchange's many bridges.

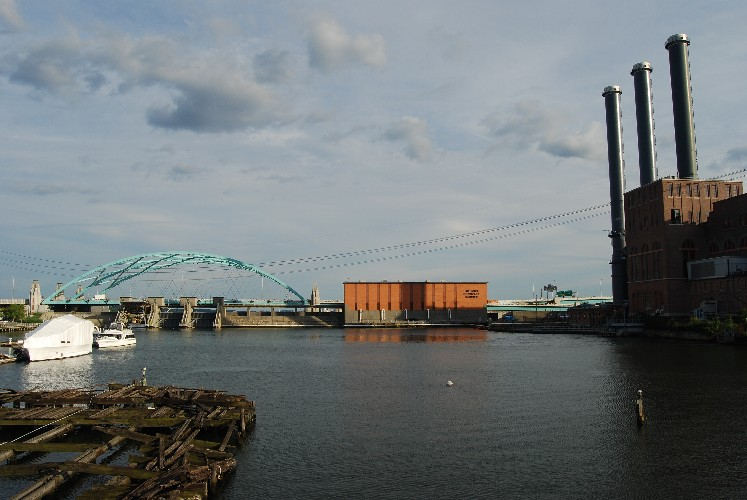
Providence River with Fox Point Hurricane Barrier. The Providence River bridge is just downstream but is not connected to the barrier. The Manchester Street Power Station is on the right.

In the 1980s, RIDOT reviewed many plans to deal with the aging section of I-195 in Providence, which was built in the 1950s. Along with having to complete numerous repairs on one of the busiest stretches of highway in Rhode Island, traffic volumes had increased tremendously over the years. The highway, designed for 75,000 vehicles a day, carried more than 160,000 cars daily at the time. The old design also had tight curves, left-hand exits, and closely spaced exits, which had contributed to excessive congestion on I-195 and nearby streets. RIDOT worked on the Iway's environmental impact statement (EIS) in the early 1990s, finding that the existing highway deteriorated bridges, substandard roadway alignments, sharp curves, and substandard shoulder widths. The department looked at three alternatives, including a no-build option in which the existing route would be reconstructed. RIDOT ultimately chose an alignment south of the Fox Point Hurricane Barrier, which would allow safety problems and congestion issues to be addressed, while also allowing for significant redevelopment of the Providence waterfront.

The 400-foot (120 m) center span of the new Providence River Bridge was built offsite at the Quonset Business Park and floated up to Providence in August 2006. The span was placed on self-propelled modular transporters, rolled onto two large barges, and floated up the bay. The opening of the Iway was preceded by a public walk on the Iway on October 20, 2007.

On November 4, 2007, the new Iway bridge opened to eastbound traffic from I-95 north to I-195 east. The new alignment of I-195 opened in stages over the next two years. The old I-195 eastbound roadway was completely closed at the end of 2008. On June 18, 2009, the new Iway bridge opened to westbound I-195 traffic to I-95 south. By October 2009, all westbound traffic on I-195 was using the new highway; the onramps to the old I-195 were closed completely, but some of the old alignment's ramps remained open. The last major ramp of the project opened in October 2011.

=== Washington Bridge closure ===
The Washington Bridge on the westbound side of I-195 was closed in December 2023 due to a critical failure of a number of pins which were designed to brace the bridge. On December 13, 2023, Rhode Island officials announced that two lanes would be restored westbound using two eastbound lanes sometime during the weekend of December 16 (later increased to three lanes), but the full repair of the westbound span was still then expected to take three months pending any additional findings. Ultimately, however, the decision was made to demolish the westbound bridge. The bridge was eventually demolished in December 2025.

== Exit list ==
Massachusetts interchanges were to be renumbered to mileage-based numbering in a project scheduled to begin in 2016, until the project was indefinitely postponed by the Massachusetts Department of Transportation (MassDOT). On November 18, 2019, MassDOT announced the project would begin in late mid-2020. The exit numbers were changed starting on October 25, 2020, and the work was completed on November 6, 2020. Rhode Island interchanges were renumbered to a mileage-based system early in 2020 in a plan announced by RIDOT in September 2017 and scheduled to begin on January 28, 2020.

State	County	Location	mi	km	Old exit	New exit	Destinations	Notes
Rhode Island	Providence	Providence	0.00	0.00			I-95 north / US 6 west to Route 10 south / Route 146 north – Boston, MA	Western terminus; western end of US 6 concurrency
Rhode Island	Providence	Providence	0.40	0.64		1A	Point Street	Westbound exit and eastbound entrance
Rhode Island	Providence	Providence	0.80	1.29		1B	I-95 south / Eddy Street – New York	Westbound exit and eastbound entrance; serves Rhode Island Hospital Trauma Center; exit 36B on I-95
Rhode Island	Providence	Providence	0.80– 1.00	1.29– 1.61	Providence River Bridge (Iway)			
Rhode Island	Providence	Providence	1.10	1.77	2	1A	Gano Street / Portugal Parkway	Eastbound exit and westbound entrance; Portugal Parkway was formerly known as, and is stilled signed from I-195 as, India Street
Rhode Island	Providence	Providence	1.30	2.09	2	1C	US 44 west / US 1A south (South Main Street)	Western end of US 44/US 1A concurrency; westbound exit and eastbound entrance
Rhode Island	Providence	Providence	1.50	2.41	3	1D	Gano Street – India Point	Westbound exit and entrance
Rhode Island	Providence	Providence	1.60– 1.80	2.57– 2.90	Washington Bridge over the Seekonk River			
Rhode Island	Providence	East Providence	1.80	2.90		1E	Waterfront Drive	Proposed westbound exit to be constructed as part of the Washington Bridge rehab project (2021-2028)
Rhode Island	Providence	East Providence	1.80	2.90	4	1	US 44 east (Taunton Avenue) – Riverside	Eastern end of US 44 concurrency; eastbound exit and westbound entrance; signed as exits 1B (Riverside) and 1C (US 44)
Rhode Island	Providence	East Providence	1.90	3.06	5	1D	Route 103 east (Warren Avenue)	Eastbound exit and westbound entrance; western terminus of Route 103
Rhode Island	Providence	East Providence	2.40	3.86	6	2	To US 44 / Route 103 – East Providence	Westbound exit and entrance
Rhode Island	Providence	East Providence	3.10	4.99	6	2A	Warren Avenue (Route 103) / Broadway / Pawtucket Avenue (Route 114)	Eastbound exit and entrance
Rhode Island	Providence	East Providence	3.30	5.31	7	2B	East Shore Expressway to Route 114 south – East Providence, Barrington, Warren, Bristol	Eastbound exit and westbound entrance
Rhode Island	Providence	East Providence	3.50	5.63	8	2C	US 6 east / US 1A north to Route 114 north (Pawtucket Avenue) – Seekonk, MA	Eastern end of US 6/US 1A concurrency; eastbound exit and westbound entrance
Runnins River			4.30 0.000	6.92 0.000	Rhode Island–Massachusetts line			
Massachusetts	Bristol	Seekonk	0.581	0.935		1	Route 114A – Seekonk, Barrington, RI	
Massachusetts	Bristol	Swansea	4.621	7.437	2	5	Route 136 south – Warren, RI, Newport, RI	Northern terminus of Route 136
Massachusetts	Bristol	Swansea	7.470	12.022	3	8	US 6 to Route 118 – Swansea	
Massachusetts	Bristol	Somerset	9.849	15.850	4	10	Route 103 / Lee's River Avenue – Somerset, Ocean Grove	Signed as exits 10A (MA 103 west) and 10B (MA 103 east) westbound
Massachusetts	Bristol	Taunton River			Charles M. Braga Jr. Memorial Bridge			
Massachusetts	Bristol	Fall River	11.984	19.286	5	11	Route 79 north / Route 138 – Taunton, N. Tiverton R.I.	Entrances have direct right-in/right-out ramps to/from Milliken Boulevard; southern terminus of Route 79
Massachusetts	Bristol	Fall River	12.439	20.019	6	12	Hartwell Street	Eastbound exit only; access via C/D lanes
Massachusetts	Bristol	Fall River	12.439	20.019	6	12	Pleasant Street	Westbound exit and entrance; access via C/D lanes
Massachusetts	Bristol	Fall River	12.711	20.456	7	13	Route 81 south (Plymouth Avenue)	Northern terminus of Route 81; access via C/D lanes
Massachusetts	Bristol	Fall River	13.769	22.159	8A	14A	Route 24 south – Tiverton, RI, Newport, RI	Western end of Route 24 concurrency; exit 3 on Route 24
Massachusetts	Bristol	Fall River	14.609	23.511	8B	14B	Route 24 north – Taunton, Boston	Left exit and entrance eastbound; eastern end of Route 24 concurrency; exit 4 on Route 24; westbound exit ramp begins in Westport
Massachusetts	Bristol	Westport	15.354	24.710	9	15	Sanford Road – North Westport	Eastbound exit only
Massachusetts	Bristol	Westport	16.343	26.302	10	16	Route 88 south to US 6 – Horseneck Beach	Northern terminus of Route 88
Massachusetts	Bristol	Dartmouth	19.433	31.274	11	19	Reed Road – Dartmouth, Hixville	Signed as exits 19A (Dartmouth south) and 19B (Hixville north) westbound
Massachusetts	Bristol	Dartmouth	21.979	35.372	12	22	Faunce Corner Road / Faunce Corner Mall Road – North Dartmouth	Split into exits 22A (Faunce Mall Road) and 22B (Faunce Corner Road) westbound
Massachusetts	Bristol	New Bedford	23.773	38.259	13	24	Route 140 to US 6 – New Bedford, Dartmouth, Taunton	Signed as exits 24A (Route 140 south) and 24B (Route 140 north); exits 2A and 2B on Route 140
Massachusetts	Bristol	New Bedford	24.627	39.633	14	25	Penniman Street	Eastbound exit and westbound entrance
Massachusetts	Bristol	New Bedford	25.087	40.374	15	26	Route 18 south – Downtown New Bedford	No access to Route 18 north or from Route 18 south
Massachusetts	Bristol	New Bedford	25.367	40.824	16	27	Washburn Street	Eastbound exit and entrance
Massachusetts	Bristol	New Bedford	25.632	41.251	17	28	Coggeshall Street	Westbound exit and entrance
Massachusetts	Bristol	Fairhaven	27.251	43.856	18	29	Route 240 south – Fairhaven	Northern terminus of Route 240
Massachusetts	Plymouth	Mattapoisett	30.916	49.754	19	31	Mattapoisett, North Rochester	Signed as exits 31A (Mattapoisett) and 31B (N. Rochester)
Massachusetts	Plymouth	Marion	35.133	56.541	20	35	Route 105 – Marion, Rochester	
Massachusetts	Plymouth	Wareham	39.233	63.139	21	39	Route 28 – Wareham, South Middleboro	
Massachusetts	Plymouth	Wareham	39.93	64.26	22	40	I-495 north / Route 25 east – Cape Cod, Marlboro	Eastern terminus; signed as exits 40A (Route 25 east) and 40B (I-495 north); trumpet interchange; southern terminus of I-495; western terminus of Route 25. Exit 1 on 495 and 25
1.000 mi = 1.609 km; 1.000 km = 0.621 mi: Concurrency terminus; Incomplete access; Unopened

== Awards ==
In June 2008, RIDOT nominated the Iway bridge float for the America's Transportation Award on the basis that the project "demonstrate[d] innovative management". The Iway bridge float was one of 10 finalists for the national award, receiving an Innovative Management award in the large project category. The Publicity Club of New England also gave RIDOT its annual "Bell Ringer" award for the Iway logo.

== Light pollution ==
One of the key features of the Iway, the new Providence River Bridge, is illuminated by architectural lighting, making it visible from many points in the city and on the Providence River. There has been criticism that this lighting has caused a considerable amount of light pollution, which has made it difficult for astronomers in the Providence area to view the night sky. Complaints have been made to the state and in response, lights are turned off at 11:00 pm to save energy and reduce light pollution.
