= Barrington River (Rhode Island) =

River in Rhode Island and Massachusetts, United States

Coordinates: 41.7430°N 71.3058°W

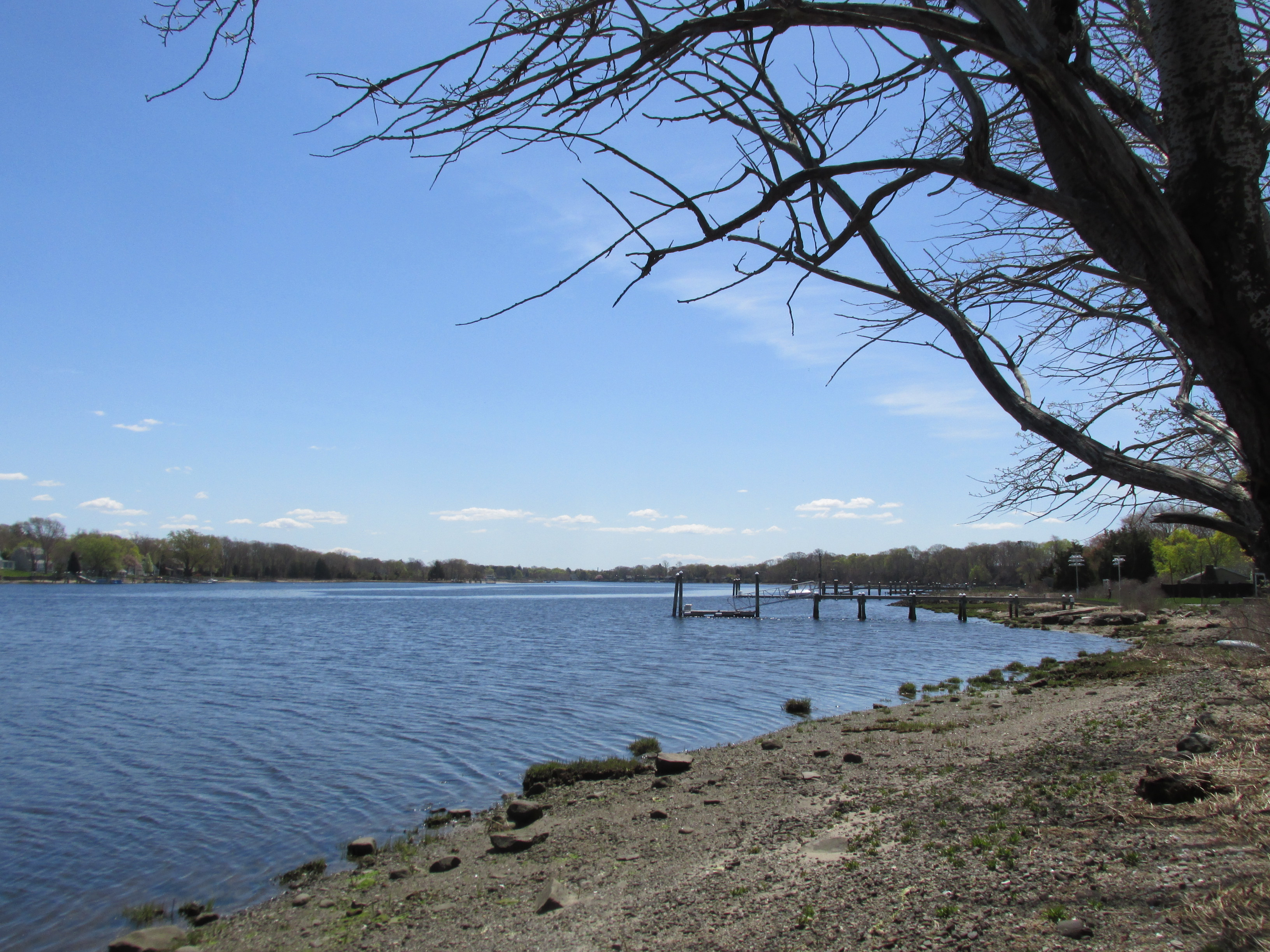
Barrington River

The Barrington River is a tidal extension of Runnins River in the U.S. states of Rhode Island and Massachusetts. It flows approximately 6 km (4 mi). There are no dams along the river's length.

== History ==
It has also historically been important for shellfishing and boating. Since May 1998, the river has been permanently closed to fishing due to fecal coliform pollution.

== Course ==
The river begins at Hundred Acre Cove which is fed to the north by Runnins River which is where the river flows into Seekonk, Massachusetts. The river then flows southeast to Barrington where it converges with the Warren River.

== Crossings ==
Below is a list of all crossings over the Barrington River. The list starts at the headwaters and goes downstream.

- Barrington
  - Massasoit Avenue
  - County Road (RI 103/114)

== See also ==
- Hundred Acre Cove, Barrington's quintessential salt water marshes home to Osprey nests and Terrapin turtle nesting sites in this wide open ecosystem that serves as a filtration system to Narragansett Bay. Great Blue Herons and Snowy Egrets dot the banks and landscape of the tidal marsh.
- List of rivers in Rhode Island
- Runnins River
