= Route 114A (Rhode Island–Massachusetts) =

Highway in Rhode Island and Massachusetts

Route 114A
- Route 114A highlighted in red

Route information
- Maintained by RIDOT
- Length: 3.4 mi (5.5 km) RI: 0.4 mi (0.6 km); MA: 3.0 mi (4.8 km)
- Existed: c. 1960s–present

Major junctions
- South end: Route 114 in East Providence, RI
- I-195 in Seekonk, MA
- North end: US 1A / Route 114 in East Providence, RI

Location
- Country: United States
- States: Rhode Island, Massachusetts
- Counties: RI: Providence, MA: Bristol

Highway system
- Rhode Island Routes
- Massachusetts State Highway System; Interstate; US; State
← Route 114	RI	→ Route 115
← Route 114	MA	→ Route 115

Route 114A is an alternate state route to Rhode Island Route 114, located along the Massachusetts – Rhode Island border in East Providence, RI and Seekonk, MA. The road begins and ends within East Providence in Rhode Island at Route 114. Most of the road, however, is located within Seekonk and designated as Massachusetts Route 114A.

== Route description ==
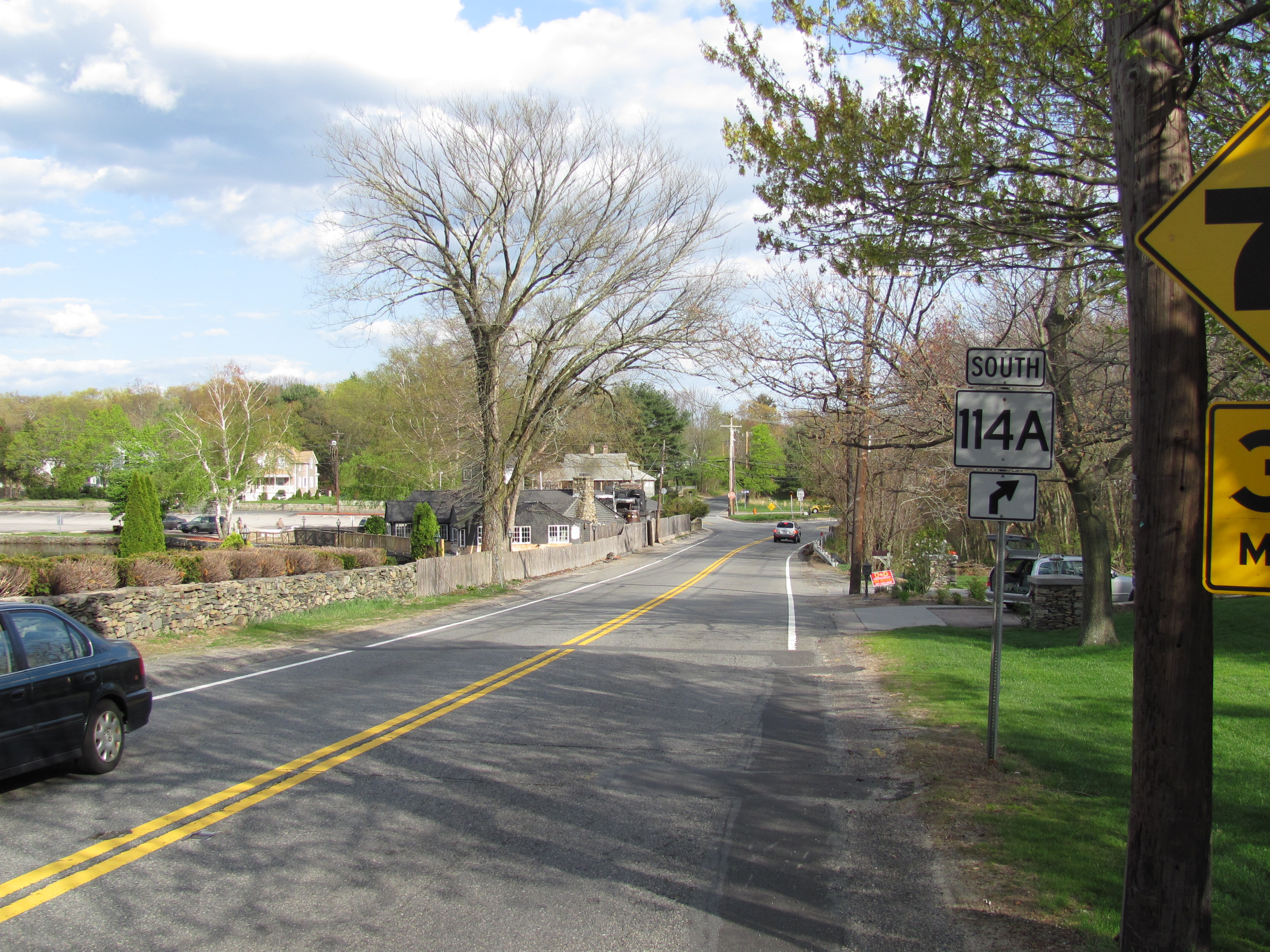
Southbound in Seekonk, Massachusetts

Route 114A begins as Mink Road at an intersection with Route 114 in East Providence. It crosses into the Massachusetts town of Seekonk after 0.1 miles (0.16 km) and continues north as Mink Street then Fall River Avenue through Seekonk center. Route 114A continues north back into Rhode Island, where it ends back at Route 114, which is overlapped with U.S. Route 1A (US 1A) at this point in East Providence.

This is the only instance in Massachusetts of an "A" or "alternate" route carrying the numerics for a highway signed in another state, as Rhode Island's Route 114 does not enter Massachusetts. Massachusetts Route 114 is an unrelated route located over 50 miles (80 km) away, running between Lawrence and Marblehead. Only three other such instances of this exist in New England: New Hampshire Route 113B (a loop off of Maine Route 113), Vermont Route 10A (a spur of New Hampshire Route 10), and Vermont Route 22A (a spur of New York Route 22).

== History ==
Route 114A was not commissioned until some time in the 1960s.

== Major intersections ==
State	County	Location	mi	km	Destinations	Notes
Rhode Island	Providence	East Providence	0.00	0.00	Route 114 – Barrington, Warren, Providence	Southern terminus
Rhode Island–Massachusetts state line			0.1 0.00	0.16 0.00	Route transition	
Massachusetts	Bristol	Seekonk	0.4	0.64	US 6 east – Fall River	Southern end of US 6 concurrency
Massachusetts	Bristol	Seekonk	0.5	0.80	US 6 west – Providence, RI	Northern end of US 6 concurrency
Massachusetts	Bristol	Seekonk	0.9	1.4	I-195 – Fall River, Cape Cod, Providence, RI	Exit 1 on I-195
Massachusetts	Bristol	Seekonk	2.7	4.3	US 44 (Taunton Avenue) – Rehoboth, Taunton, Providence, RI, East Providence, RI	
Massachusetts–Rhode Island state line			3.0 0.00	4.8 0.00	Route transition	
Rhode Island	Providence	East Providence	0.3	0.48	US 1A / Route 114 (Pawtucket Avenue)	Northern terminus
1.000 mi = 1.609 km; 1.000 km = 0.621 mi: Concurrency terminus; Route transition
