= Ballou House =

Ballou House may refer to:

- Ballou-Newbegin House, Dublin, New Hampshire
- Ballou–Weatherhead House, Cumberland, Rhode Island
- Ballou House (Lincoln, Rhode Island)
- Angell–Ballou House, Smithfield, Rhode Island
- Smith–Ballou House, Woonsocket, Rhode Island
