= Naushon Company Plant =

- U.S. National Register of Historic Places
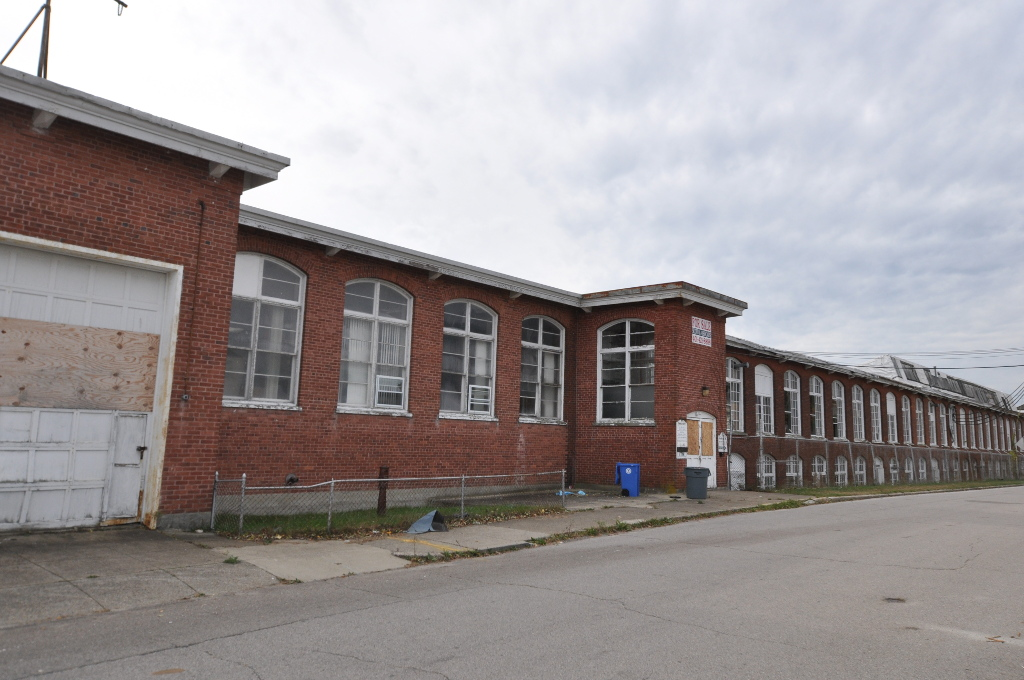

- Location within Rhode Island Location within the United States
- Location: 32 Meeting St., Cumberland, Rhode Island
- Coordinates: 41°53′58″N 71°23′32″W
- Area: 3.5 acres (1.4 ha)
- Built: 1902
- Architect: Henry, William T.
- Architectural style: Industrial Italianate
- NRHP reference No.: 16000854
- Added to NRHP: April 26, 1978

The Naushon Company Plant is a historic textile mill complex at 32 Meeting Street in Cumberland, Rhode Island. First built in 1902–1904 and enlarged over time, it illustrates the adaption of the site to differing uses between then and the 1950s, when its use for textile manufacture ended. The complex was listed on the National Register of Historic Places in 1978.

== Description and history ==
The former Naushon Company Plant is located in the Valley Falls area of southernmost Cumberland, on 3.5 acres (1.4 ha) of land between Meeting Street (to the north) and the Blackstone River (to the south). The complex includes five interconnected buildings and one that is detached, of which four are brick, one is wood-frame, and the last is of concrete construction. The main mill building is a two-story brick structure, 339 by 170 feet (103 m × 52 m). Its notable features are a significant number of original segmented-arch windows, and a distinctive sawtooth roof of a type commonly used on early 20th-century mill buildings but not often preserved. Along its riverfront elevation there also a series of pilaster-shaped venting flues, part of the building's original air handling system.

The Naushon Company was incorporated in 1901 in New Jersey as a joint stock company headed by Malcolm Chace, a grandson of the founder of the nearby Valley Falls Mill. Initially taking over an existing textile operation in Woonsocket, the company began construction of this facility in 1902, with much of its extant footprint completed by 1904. The mill was designed by William T. Henry, a well-known industrial architect from Fall River, Massachusetts. The company produced gingham wash fabric until it failed in 1909; subsequent owners engaged in the manufacture of textiles produced cotton-silk blends, mohair and camel-hair fabrics, and synthetics. In 1962 the complex was acquired by a property management company and readapted for light industrial use.

== See also ==
- National Register of Historic Places listings in Providence County, Rhode Island
