= Brown Avenue Historic District =

Historic district in Rhode Island, United States

Coordinates: 41.846931°N 71.539585°W

- U.S. National Register of Historic Places
- U.S. Historic district
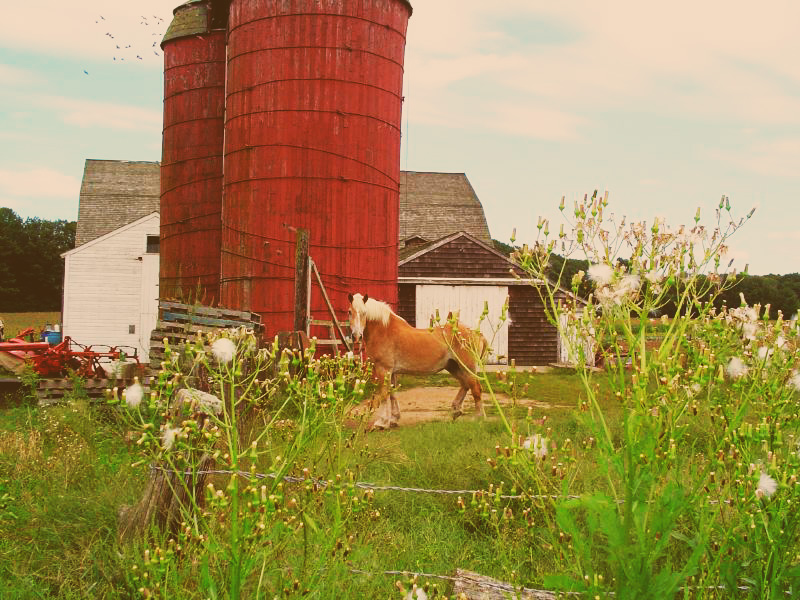
- Dame Farm, part of Snake Den State Park

- Location within Rhode Island Location within the United States
- Location: Johnston, Rhode Island
- Area: 563 acres (228 ha)
- NRHP reference No.: 73000066
- Added to NRHP: April 24, 1973

The Brown Avenue Historic District is a rural historic district in Johnston, Rhode Island, USA. The district encompasses a rural and agricultural landscape centered on a 1-mile (1.6 km) stretch in the midsection of Brown Avenue, which runs between Hartford Avenue (United States Route 6) and Greenville Avenue (Rhode Island Route 5). There are five farmsteads, with the Dame Farmstead at its center, whose farmhouses date to the late 18th century. A number of these farms are no longer in production, and part of the district is in Snake Den State Park.

The district was added to the National Register of Historic Places in 1973.

== See also ==
- National Register of Historic Places listings in Providence County, Rhode Island
