= Edwin H. Farnum House =

Historic house in Rhode Island, United States

- U.S. National Register of Historic Places
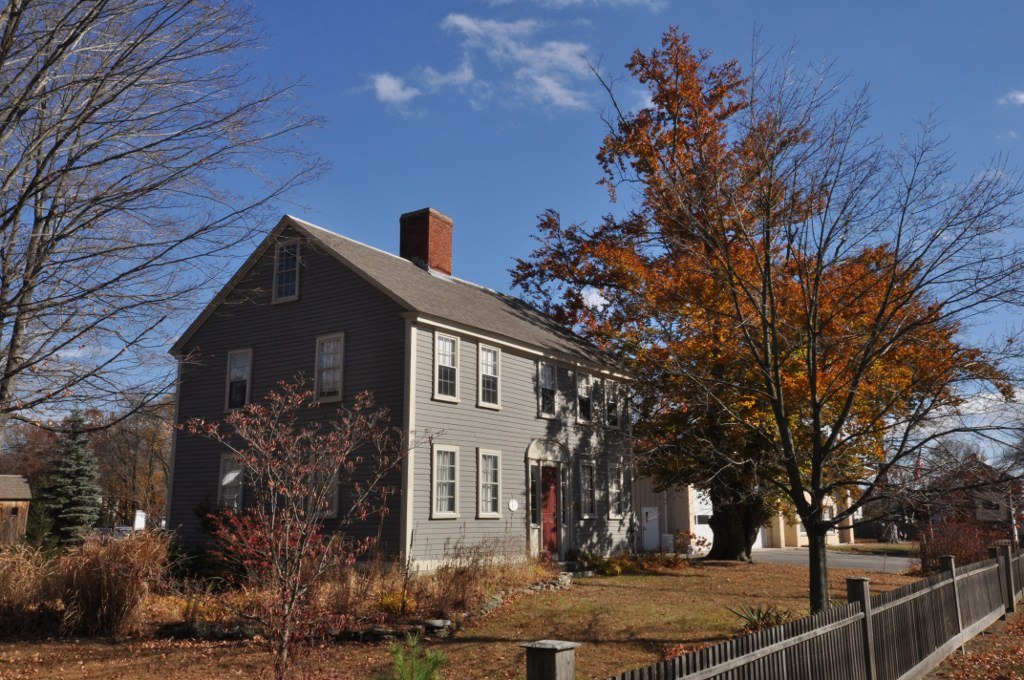

- Location within Rhode Island Location within the United States
- Location: Johnston, Rhode Island
- Coordinates: 41°51′46″N 71°29′39″W
- Built: 1765
- Architect: Angell, Stephen; Angell, Daniel
- Architectural style: Federal
- NRHP reference No.: 74000359
- Added to NRHP: May 17, 1974

The Edwin H. Farnum House is an historic house at the junction of Putnam Pike (United States Route 44) and Collins Street in Johnston, Rhode Island. It is a two-story wood-frame structure, five bays wide, with a large central chimney. It was built c. 1765, either by Stephen Angell or his son Daniel, and enlarged about 1795 by Edwin Farnum. The main entry exhibits Federal styling probably added by Farnum, with 3/4 length sidelight windows and a segmented fanlight above. The right-side bays on the first floor have been replaced by a 20th-century bay window.

The house was listed on the National Register of Historic Places in 1974.

== See also ==
- Daniel Angell House, owned by (and once thought to be built by) Daniel Angell
- National Register of Historic Places listings in Providence County, Rhode Island
