= Potter–Remington House =

Historic house in Rhode Island, United States

- U.S. National Register of Historic Places
- Location within Rhode Island Location within the United States
- Nearest city: 571 Natick Road, Cranston, Rhode Island
- Coordinates: 41°44′30″N 71°29′35″W
- Area: 9.5 acres (3.8 ha)
- Built: 1790
- Architectural style: Federal
- NRHP reference No.: 78000006
- Added to NRHP: December 28, 1978

The Potter–Remingston House is an historic house in Cranston, Rhode Island. It is a 2 1/2-story wood-frame structure, five bays wide, with a large central chimney, and a two-story ell attached to the west side. It is set on what was originally a 21-acre (8.5 ha) parcel of rolling woods and overgrown fields, adjacent to the Remington family cemetery. The outside of the house has relatively plain styling, but its interior public spaces include some elaborate Federal period woodwork. It is one of the few surviving 18th-century farm houses in Cranston.

The house was listed on the National Register of Historic Places in 1978.

== See also ==
- National Register of Historic Places listings in Providence County, Rhode Island
