= Pocasset Worsted Company Mill =

- U.S. National Register of Historic Places
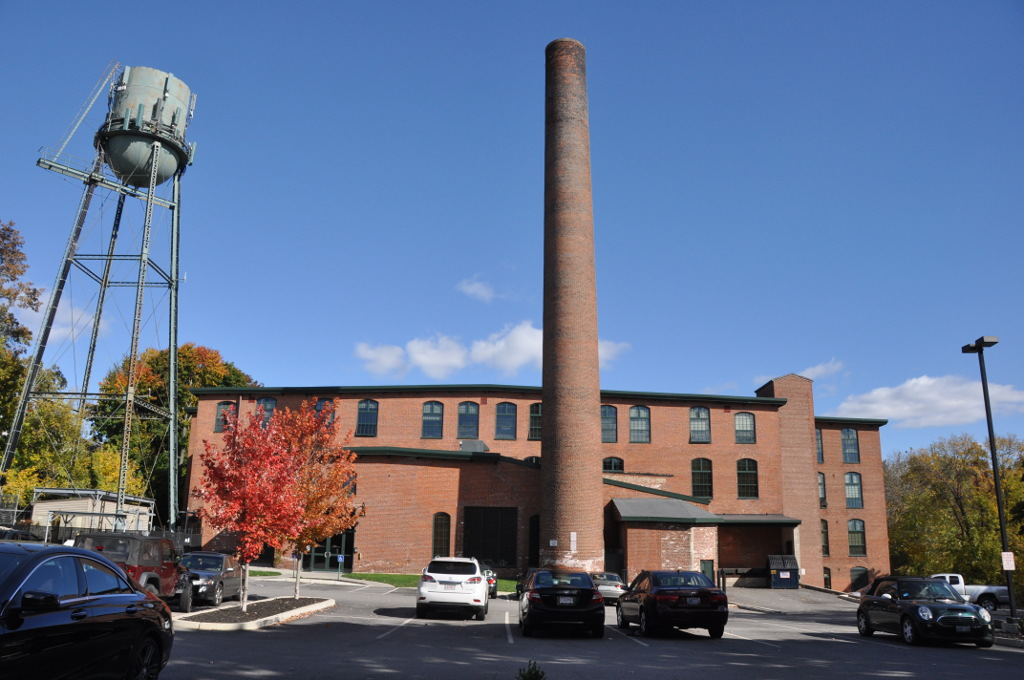

- Location within Rhode Island Location within the United States
- Location: 75 Pocasset St., Johnston, Rhode Island
- Coordinates: 41.797222°N 71.476111°W
- Area: 3.38 acres (1.37 ha)
- NRHP reference No.: 10000471
- Added to NRHP: July 19, 2010

The Pocasset Worsted Company Mill is an historic industrial complex at 75 Pocasset Street in Johnston, Rhode Island. It consists of a complex of four connected brick buildings, built between 1897 and 1902. The buildings form a rough U shape on a 3.38 acres (1.37 ha) parcel of land between Pocasset Street and the Pocasset River. The two legs of the U are nearly identical main mill buildings, constructed in 1897 and 1902; they are joined by an engine and boiler house. The mill office building is attached to the southern (1897) mill building. The Pocasset Worsted Company was Johnston's largest employer in the early 20th century; its buildings were used for textile production until 1989.

The complex was listed on the National Register of Historic Places in 2006.

== See also ==
- National Register of Historic Places listings in Providence County, Rhode Island
