= National Register of Historic Places listings in Providence County, Rhode Island =

Location of Providence County in Rhode Island

Providence County, Rhode Island, United States, has 440 properties and districts listed on the National Register of Historic Places, including 15 National Historic Landmarks.

The cities of Pawtucket, Woonsocket, and Providence include 58, 44, and 171 of these properties and districts, respectively, including 13 of the National Historic Landmarks; they are listed separately. Properties and districts located in the county's other municipalities, including 2 National Historic Landmarks, are listed here. The Blackstone Canal, which extends through Providence, Pawtucket, Woonsocket, and other communities appears here and on the respective community lists; the Conant Thread-Coats & Clark Mill Complex District is in both Central Falls and Pawtucket, and is thus listed below and on the Pawtucket list. The Norwood Avenue Historic District is located in both Providence and Cranston.

Latitude and longitude coordinates are provided for many National Register properties and districts; these locations may be seen together in a map.

Contents: Counties in Rhode Island

Bristol | Kent | Newport | Providence (Pawtucket | Providence (city) | Woonsocket) | Washington

This National Park Service list is complete through NPS recent listings posted June 26, 2026.

This National Park Service list is complete through NPS recent listings posted June 26, 2026.

== Current listings ==
=== Other communities ===
	Name on the Register	Image	Date listed	Location	City or town	Description
1	Albion Historic District	Albion Historic District	July 19, 1984 (#84001899)	Roughly bounded by Berkshire Dr., Willow Lane, Ledge Way, Kennedy Boulevard, and School and Main Sts. 41°57′06″N 71°27′26″W	Lincoln	
2	Allendale Mill	Allendale Mill	May 7, 1973 (#73000063)	494 Woonasquatucket Ave. 41°51′00″N 71°28′51″W	North Providence	
3	Allenville Mill Storehouse	Allenville Mill Storehouse	January 20, 1972 (#72000033)	5 Esmond St. 41°52′41″N 71°30′09″W	Smithfield	
4	American Supply Company Building	American Supply Company Building	May 8, 2017 (#100000978)	1420 Broad St. 41°53′56″N 71°23′24″W	Central Falls	
5	Andrews Mill Company Plant		September 13, 2018 (#100002937)	761 Great Rd. 42°00′00″N 71°33′13″W	North Smithfield	
6	Andrews–Luther Farm	Andrews–Luther Farm	June 19, 1985 (#85001352)	Elmdale Rd. 41°51′08″N 71°36′04″W	Scituate	
7	Daniel Angell House	Daniel Angell House	April 21, 1975 (#75000056)	15 Dean Ave. 41°52′46″N 71°30′01″W	Johnston	
8	Otis Angell Gristmill	Otis Angell Gristmill	November 3, 2017 (#100001779)	1 Governor Notte Pkwy. 41°52′13″N 71°27′39″W	North Providence	
9	Angell–Ballou House	Angell–Ballou House	March 18, 2004 (#04000196)	49 Ridge Rd. 41°53′42″N 71°30′05″W	Smithfield	
10	Arkwright Bridge	Arkwright Bridge	December 12, 1978 (#78000061)	Crosses the Pawtuxet River at Hill St. 41°43′49″N 71°32′49″W	Cranston	Extends into Kent County
11	Arnold Mills Historic District	Arnold Mills Historic District	December 28, 1978 (#78000070)	East of Cumberland Hill at Sneech Pond, Attleboro, and Abbott Run Valley Rds. 41°58′46″N 71°23′30″W	Cumberland	
12	Dexter Arnold Farmstead	Dexter Arnold Farmstead	November 25, 1977 (#77001586)	Chopmist Hill Rd. 41°48′59″N 71°39′54″W	Scituate	
13	Eleazer Arnold House	Eleazer Arnold House	November 24, 1968 (#68000006)	Great Rd. (RI 123) near its junction with RI 126; 41°54′10″N 71°25′14″W	Lincoln	
14	Israel Arnold House	Israel Arnold House	December 18, 1970 (#70000017)	Great Rd. 41°54′17″N 71°25′35″W	Lincoln	
15	Peleg Arnold Tavern	Peleg Arnold Tavern	July 30, 1974 (#74000046)	Woonsocket Hill Rd. 41°59′21″N 71°32′02″W	North Smithfield	
16	Ashton Historic District	Ashton Historic District	November 1, 1984 (#84000367)	Roughly Mendon, Scott, and Old Angell Rds., Store Hill Rd., Front and Middle Sts. 41°56′20″N 71°25′54″W	Cumberland	
17	Ballou House	Ballou House	August 30, 1984 (#84001908)	Albion Rd. 41°56′48″N 71°28′21″W	Lincoln	
18	Ballou–Weatherhead House	Ballou–Weatherhead House	June 25, 1993 (#93000503)	Tower Hill Rd. (Pole 68); 41°59′47″N 71°26′38″W	Cumberland	
19	Battey–Barden House	Battey–Barden House	August 29, 1980 (#80000084)	Plainfield Pike; 41°47′30″N 71°37′08″W	Scituate	
20	Belknap School	Belknap School	December 7, 2010 (#10000978)	509 Greenville Ave. 41°50′48″N 71°30′05″W	Johnston	
21	Berkeley Mill Village	Berkeley Mill Village	February 23, 1972 (#72000036)	Bounded roughly by Martin St., Mendon Rd., railroad, and cemetery 41°55′39″N 71°25′25″W	Cumberland	
22	Bicknell–Armington Lightning Splitter House	Bicknell–Armington Lightning Splitter House	November 28, 1980 (#80000085)	3591 Pawtucket Ave. 41°46′36″N 71°21′47″W	East Providence	
23	Blackstone Canal	Blackstone Canal	May 6, 1971 (#71000030)	From Steeple and Promenade Sts. in Providence to the Massachusetts border in North Smithfield; 41°55′16″N 71°25′21″W	Lincoln, Cumberland, and North Smithfield	Initial listing extended from Providence, through Pawtucket, and as far north as Lincoln; a 1991 expansion (#91001536) extended it to the state line; the canal itself extended into Worcester County, Massachusetts, where it is the subject of separate listings.
24	Borders Farm	Borders Farm	July 29, 2009 (#09000576)	31-38 N. Rd. 41°47′17″N 71°44′38″W	Foster	
25	Boston and Providence Railroad Bridge	Boston and Providence Railroad Bridge	November 28, 1980 (#80000086)	Spans the Ten Mile River; 41°50′05″N 71°21′45″W	East Providence	
26	Breezy Hill Site (RI-957)		September 28, 1985 (#85002700)	Address Restricted	Foster	
27	Bridgeton School	Bridgeton School	December 27, 2006 (#06001191)	16 Laurel Hill Ave. 41°57′52″N 71°42′47″W	Burrillville	
28	Bridgham Farm	Bridgham Farm	November 28, 1980 (#80000087)	120, 148, 150, and 160 Pleasant St. 41°50′13″N 71°20′38″W	East Providence	
29	Brown Avenue Historic District	Brown Avenue Historic District	April 24, 1973 (#73000066)	Brown Ave. 41°50′44″N 71°32′37″W	Johnston	
30	Burlingame–Noon House	Burlingame–Noon House	February 15, 1974 (#74000048)	3261 Mendon Rd. 41°58′32″N 71°27′25″W	Cumberland	
31	Carpenter, Lakeside, and Springvale Cemeteries	Carpenter, Lakeside, and Springvale Cemeteries	November 28, 1980 (#80000091)	Newman and Pawtucket Aves. 41°50′33″N 71°21′09″W	East Providence	
32	Central Falls Congregational Church	Central Falls Congregational Church	July 12, 1976 (#76000042)	376 High St. 41°53′05″N 71°23′04″W	Central Falls	
33	Central Falls Mill Historic District	Central Falls Mill Historic District	July 2, 1976 (#76000007)	Between Roosevelt Avenue and the Blackstone River; also 381, 396, 403, 404, 413, 548, 558 Roosevelt Ave. 41°53′11″N 71°22′55″W	Central Falls	Second set of addresses represents a boundary increase approved January 29, 2018
34	Central Street School	Central Street School	April 6, 1979 (#79000004)	379 Central St. 41°53′04″N 71°23′38″W	Central Falls	
35	Chepachet Village Historic District	Chepachet Village Historic District	March 31, 1971 (#71000031)	Both sides of U.S. Route 44 (roughly from the intersection of U.S. Route 44 and RI 102 north to the intersection of RI 100 and RI 102) and radiating 41°54′46″N 71°40′00″W	Glocester	
36	Cherry Valley Archeological Site, RI-279		November 1, 1984 (#84000358)	Address Restricted	Glocester	
37	Clayville Historic District	Clayville Historic District	December 29, 1988 (#88003079)	Roughly bounded by Cole Ave., Plainfield Pike, Field Hill Rd., and Victory Highway; 41°46′37″N 71°40′35″W	Foster and Scituate	
38	Clemence–Irons House	Clemence–Irons House	July 2, 1973 (#73000068)	38 George Waterman Rd. 41°50′21″N 71°29′04″W	Johnston	
39	John Cole Farm	John Cole Farm	August 16, 1977 (#77000025)	East of Manville on Reservoir Rd. 41°59′26″N 71°24′24″W	Cumberland	
40	Columbus	Columbus	October 19, 2001 (#01000468)	Johnston Memorial Park; 41°47′48″N 71°25′33″W	Johnston	Originally located in Providence. Removed from Providence in June 2020 and relocated to Johnston Memorial Park in October 2023.
41	Samuel B. Conant House	Samuel B. Conant House	April 6, 1979 (#79000005)	104 Clay St. 41°52′59″N 71°23′25″W	Central Falls	
42	Conant Thread-Coats & Clark Mill Complex District	Conant Thread-Coats & Clark Mill Complex District	November 18, 1983 (#83003809)	Roughly bounded by Lonsdale Avenue, Rand and Pine Streets. 41°52′51″N 71°23′53″W	Central Falls	Extends into Pawtucket
43	Amos Cooke House	Amos Cooke House	October 30, 1979 (#79000054)	Chopmist Hill Rd. 41°48′31″N 71°39′41″W	Scituate	
44	Cornell–Randall–Bailey Roadhouse	Cornell–Randall–Bailey Roadhouse	May 10, 1984 (#84001943)	2737 Hartford Ave. 41°49′57″N 71°33′29″W	Johnston	
45	Crescent Park Looff Carousel	Crescent Park Looff Carousel	April 21, 1976 (#76000045)	Riverside Park; 41°45′24″N 71°21′34″W	East Providence	Restored 1895 carousel features some of Charles I.D. Looff's finest workmanship
46	Cumberland Town Hall Historic District	Cumberland Town Hall Historic District	October 21, 2019 (#100004532)	45 Broad St. and 16 Mill St. 41°54′01″N 71°23′27″W	Cumberland	
47	Nathaniel Daggett House	Nathaniel Daggett House	November 28, 1980 (#80000092)	74 Roger Williams Ave. 41°50′16″N 71°21′46″W	East Providence	
48	James Dennis House	James Dennis House	November 28, 1980 (#80000095)	3120 Pawtucket Ave. 41°47′21″N 71°21′53″W	East Providence	
49	District 6 Schoolhouse	District 6 Schoolhouse	November 28, 1980 (#80000096)	347 Willett Ave; 41°46′23″N 71°21′19″W	East Providence	
50	Capt. George Dorrance House	Capt. George Dorrance House	March 16, 1972 (#72000039)	2 Jencks Rd. 41°44′22″N 71°47′12″W	Foster	
51	Double L Site, RI-958		September 12, 1985 (#85002362)	Address Restricted	Scituate	
52	Eddy Homestead	Eddy Homestead	August 13, 1986 (#86001511)	2543 Hartford Ave. 41°49′57″N 71°32′56″W	Johnston	
53	Edgewood Historic District–Aberdeen Plat	Edgewood Historic District–Aberdeen Plat	November 22, 2016 (#16000833)	Berwick Ln., Chiswick Rd., Strathmore Place and Road, portions of Broad St., and Narragansett Blvd., 41°46′13″N 71°23′33″W	Cranston	
54	Edgewood Historic District–Anstis Greene Estate Plats	Edgewood Historic District–Anstis Greene Estate Plats	August 3, 2015 (#15000497)	Anstis, Broad & Swift Sts., Birchfield & Kensington Rds., Bluff, King, Marion & Rosewood Aves., Narragansett Blvd. 41°46′25″N 71°23′40″W	Cranston	
55	Edgewood Historic District–Arnold Farm Plat	Edgewood Historic District–Arnold Farm Plat	September 10, 2010 (#10000733)	Arnold, Albert, Columbia Aves.; parts of Broad St., Pawtuxet Ave., Narragansett Blvd. 41°46′38″N 71°23′44″W	Cranston	
56	Edgewood Historic District–Taft Estate Plat	Edgewood Historic District–Taft Estate Plat	October 24, 2003 (#03001069)	Roughly bounded by Windsor Rd., Narragansett Bay, Circuit Dr., and Broad St.; E. side of Narragansett Blvd. between Windsor Rd. & Ocean Ave. 41°46′14″N 71°23′27″W	Cranston	Second set of addresses represents a boundary increase, 2014-12-22
57	Edgewood Historic District–Sally Greene Homestead Plats	Edgewood Historic District–Sally Greene Homestead Plats	November 22, 2016 (#16000787)	Fairview and Glen Aves., Harbour Terr., Hudson Pl., Massasoit Ave., and portions of Broad St. & Narragansett Blvd, 41°46′22″N 71°23′31″W	Cranston	
58	Edgewood Historic District–Shaw Plat	Edgewood Historic District–Shaw Plat	March 27, 2013 (#13000120)	Shaw and Marion Aves., parts of Narragansett Boulevard, and Broad St. 41°46′30″N 71°23′41″W	Cranston	
59	Edgewood Yacht Club	Edgewood Yacht Club	February 23, 1989 (#89000072)	3 Shaw Ave. 41°46′34″N 71°23′26″W	Cranston	
60	Elliot–Harris–Miner House	Elliot–Harris–Miner House	August 30, 1984 (#84001984)	1406 Old Louisquisset Pike; 41°52′43″N 71°26′11″W	Lincoln	
61	Elm Tree Plat Historic District	Elm Tree Plat Historic District	November 19, 2015 (#15000829)	Charlotte & Elinora Sts., Fenner, Harvey & Willett Aves. 41°46′13″N 71°21′10″W	East Providence	
62	Esten–Bowen House	Esten–Bowen House	December 30, 2011 (#11000978)	299 Iron Mine Rd. 42°00′17″N 71°38′17″W	Burrillville	
63	David G. Fales House	David G. Fales House	April 6, 1979 (#79000006)	476 High St. 41°53′10″N 71°23′05″W	Central Falls	
64	Edwin H. Farnum House	Edwin H. Farnum House	May 17, 1974 (#74000359)	U.S. Route 44 at its junction with Collins St. 41°51′46″N 71°29′39″W	Johnston	
65	Thomas Fenner House	Thomas Fenner House	March 2, 1990 (#90000143)	43 Stony Acre Dr. 41°47′27″N 71°29′19″W	Cranston	
66	Forestdale Mill Village Historic District	Forestdale Mill Village Historic District	June 5, 1972 (#72000041)	East and west along Main St. and north on Maple Ave. 41°59′51″N 71°33′50″W	North Smithfield	
67	Foster Center Historic District	Foster Center Historic District	May 11, 1974 (#74000050)	Foster; 41°47′07″N 71°43′18″W	Foster	
68	Furnace Carolina Site	Furnace Carolina Site	May 10, 1993 (#93000341)	Address Restricted	Cumberland	
69	Furnace Hill Brook Historic and Archeological District	Furnace Hill Brook Historic and Archeological District	August 6, 1980 (#80000097)	off Furnace Hill Road; 41°45′20″N 71°29′15″W	Cranston	
70	Georgiaville Historic District	Georgiaville Historic District	October 3, 1985 (#85002734)	Roughly bounded by Stillwater Rd., Cross St., Whipple Ave., and Farnum Pike; 41°53′18″N 71°30′26″W	Smithfield	
71	Glocester Town Pound	Glocester Town Pound	September 22, 1970 (#70000021)	Pound Rd. and Chopmist Hill Rd. 41°53′44″N 71°40′09″W	Glocester	
72	Grant's Mill		July 1, 2026 (#100013177)	36 Grants Mill Road; 42°00′24″N 71°25′04″W	Cumberland	
73	Great Road Historic District	Great Road Historic District	July 22, 1974 (#74000051)	Great Rd. 41°54′21″N 71°25′41″W	Lincoln	
74	Benjamin F. Greene House	Benjamin F. Greene House	April 6, 1979 (#79000007)	85 Cross St. 41°53′08″N 71°23′11″W	Central Falls	
75	Greystone Historic District	Greystone Historic District	January 2, 2008 (#07001343)	1-16 Beckside Rd., 1-29 Greystone Ave., 1-24 Oakleigh Ave., 1-40 Langsberries Ave., 2-20 Larchmount Ave N, 1-16 S... 41°52′02″N 71°29′24″W	North Providence and Johnston	Mill complex and associated village and housing area
76	Greystone Mill Historic District	Greystone Mill Historic District	April 28, 2004 (#04000378)	Greystone Ave. 41°51′53″N 71°29′28″W	North Providence and Johnston	Mill complex along the Woonasquatucket River
77	Harmony Chapel and Cemetery	Harmony Chapel and Cemetery	June 25, 1980 (#80000098)	Putnam Pike; 41°53′20″N 71°36′03″W	Glocester	
78	Harrisville Historic District	Harrisville Historic District	March 21, 1984 (#84002010)	Roughly bounded by Wood and Sherman Rds., East Ave, and Main, Chapel, School, and River Sts. 41°57′59″N 71°40′33″W	Burrillville	
79	Hearthside	Hearthside	April 24, 1973 (#73000069)	Great Rd. 41°54′23″N 71°25′50″W	Lincoln	
80	Holy Trinity Church Complex	Holy Trinity Church Complex	January 3, 1978 (#78000073)	134 Fuller Ave. 41°53′19″N 71°23′47″W	Central Falls	Church demolished; only the parish house is extant.
81	Hope Village Historic District	Hope Village Historic District	August 8, 1995 (#95000918)	Roughly bounded by the Pawtuxet River, Hope Furnace Rd., Hope Mill Pond, North Rd., White Ln., and Harrington and Potter Sts. 41°44′00″N 71°33′45″W	Scituate	
82	Thomas H. Hughes House	Thomas H. Hughes House	June 15, 1979 (#79000056)	423 Central Ave. 41°48′28″N 71°29′51″W	Johnston	
83	Jenckes House	Jenckes House	August 30, 1984 (#84002019)	81 Jenckes Hill Rd. 41°54′16″N 71°27′32″W	Lincoln	
84	Jenckes House	Jenckes House	October 10, 1984 (#84000088)	1730 Old Louisquisset Pike; 41°53′44″N 71°26′55″W	Lincoln	
85	Jenks Park & Cogswell Tower	Jenks Park & Cogswell Tower	April 6, 1979 (#79000057)	Adjoining 580 Broad St. 41°53′15″N 71°23′21″W	Central Falls	
86	Luke Jillson House	Luke Jillson House	August 12, 1982 (#82000141)	2510 Mendon Rd. 41°57′41″N 71°26′41″W	Cumberland	
87	Joy Homestead	Joy Homestead	February 18, 1971 (#71000035)	156 Scituate Ave. 41°46′57″N 71°28′36″W	Cranston	
88	Knightsville Meetinghouse	Knightsville Meetinghouse	March 8, 1978 (#78000074)	67 Phenix Ave. 41°46′54″N 71°28′08″W	Cranston	
89	Lime Kilns	Lime Kilns	August 30, 1984 (#84002015)	Off Louisquisset Pike, Sherman Ave., and Dexter Rock Rds.	Lincoln	Ruined remnants of three colonial-era lime kilns at different locations.
90	Limerock Village Historic District	Limerock Village Historic District	May 23, 1974 (#74000052)	In an irregular pattern along Smith, Wilbur, and Great Rds., and Old Louisquisset Pike; 41°55′40″N 71°27′22″W	Lincoln	
91	Lippitt Hill Historic District	Lippitt Hill Historic District	March 2, 1989 (#89000142)	Hope Rd., Burlingame Rd., and Lippett Ave. 41°44′23″N 71°32′06″W	Cranston	
92	Little Neck Cemetery	Little Neck Cemetery	November 28, 1980 (#80000100)	Off Read St. 41°45′59″N 71°21′18″W	East Providence	
93	Lonsdale Historic District	Lonsdale Historic District	May 25, 1984 (#84002022)	Lonsdale Ave., Blackstone Ct., and Front, Main, Cook, Broad, Mill, Cross and Blackstone Sts. 41°54′34″N 71°24′11″W	Cumberland and Lincoln	
94	Lymansville Company Mill	Lymansville Company Mill	December 26, 2012 (#12001098)	184 Woonasquatucket Ave. 41°50′21″N 71°28′32″W	North Providence	
95	Manton–Hunt–Farnum Farm	Manton–Hunt–Farnum Farm	October 3, 1985 (#85002735)	Putnam Pike; 41°53′54″N 71°37′15″W	Glocester	
96	Manville Company Worker Housing Historic District	Manville Company Worker Housing Historic District	April 2, 2009 (#08001183)	Bounded by Chestnut St., Angle St., Railroad St., Winter St., Fall St., Spring St., Park Way, Almeida Dr., and Main St. 41°58′13″N 71°28′18″W	Lincoln	
97	Mathewson Farm	Mathewson Farm	January 26, 2001 (#01000019)	544 Greenville Ave. 41°50′44″N 71°30′16″W	Johnston	
98	McGonagle Site, RI-1227		September 12, 1985 (#85002400)	Address Restricted	Scituate	
99	Metcalf–Franklin Farm	Metcalf–Franklin Farm	June 7, 2007 (#07000526)	142 Abbott Run Valley Rd. 41°57′56″N 71°23′37″W	Cumberland	
100	Millrace Site, RI-1039		September 12, 1985 (#85002361)	Address Restricted	Scituate	
101	Moosup Valley Historic District	Moosup Valley Historic District	May 11, 1988 (#88000521)	Roughly bounded by Harrington, Johnson, Moosup Valley and Barb Hill, and Cucumber Hill Rds. 41°44′25″N 71°45′23″W	Foster	
102	Moswansicut Pond Site, RI-960		September 12, 1985 (#85002363)	Address Restricted	Scituate	
103	Mt. Hygeia	Mt. Hygeia	August 12, 1977 (#77000008)	Mt. Hygeia Rd. 41°50′48″N 71°45′17″W	Foster	Also known as the Solomon Drown House.
104	Mount Vernon Tavern	Mount Vernon Tavern	May 8, 1974 (#74000001)	199 Plainfield Pike (RI 14); 41°43′51″N 71°42′52″W	Foster	
105	Tyler Mowry House	Tyler Mowry House	August 16, 1996 (#96000904)	112 Sayles Hill Rd. 41°57′53″N 71°30′18″W	North Smithfield	
106	William Mowry House	William Mowry House	February 10, 1983 (#83000001)	Farnum Pike; 41°56′52″N 71°33′33″W	North Smithfield	
107	Naushon Company Plant	Naushon Company Plant	December 13, 2016 (#16000854)	32 Meeting St. 41°53′58″N 71°23′32″W	Cumberland	
108	Newman Cemetery	Newman Cemetery	November 28, 1980 (#80000002)	Newman and Pawtucket Aves. 41°50′22″N 71°21′04″W	East Providence	
109	Newman Congregational Church	Newman Congregational Church	November 28, 1980 (#80000003)	100 Newman Ave. 41°50′28″N 71°21′03″W	East Providence	
110	Hopkins Mill Historic District	Hopkins Mill Historic District	May 10, 1984 (#84002013)	Old Danielson Pike, U.S. Route 6, Maple Rock and Rams Trail Rds. 41°49′21″N 71°42′25″W	Foster	Misspelled "Nopkins" in the National Register
111	Norwood Avenue Historic District	Norwood Avenue Historic District	April 26, 2002 (#02000412)	Roughly along Norwood Ave. between Roger Williams to Broad St. 41°46′51″N 71°24′12″W	Cranston	Extends into Providence.
112	Oak Lawn Village Historic District	Oak Lawn Village Historic District	November 25, 1977 (#77000004)	Wilbur Ave. from Natick Rd. to Oaklawn Ave., includes Searle, Exchange, and Wheelock Sts. 41°44′57″N 71°29′06″W	Cranston	
113	Oakland Historic District	Oakland Historic District	September 9, 1987 (#87001359)	Victory Highway; 41°57′32″N 71°38′47″W	Burrillville	
114	Ochee Spring Quarry	Ochee Spring Quarry	May 5, 1978 (#78000003)	Behind 767 Hartford Ave; 41°49′14″N 71°28′17″W	Johnston	This site has been significantly encroached on by local development.
115	Oddfellow's Hall	Oddfellow's Hall	November 28, 1980 (#80000004)	63-67 Warren Ave. 41°49′01″N 71°22′56″W	East Providence	
116	Old Ashton Historic District	Old Ashton Historic District	August 30, 1984 (#84002037)	Lower River Rd. and Blackstone Canal Towpath; 41°56′11″N 71°26′04″W	Lincoln	Now a site on the Blackstone River Bikeway State Park
117	Old Congregational Church	Old Congregational Church	January 11, 1974 (#74000002)	Off U.S. Route 6 on Greenville Rd. (RI 116); 41°50′03″N 71°35′14″W	Scituate	
118	Capt. Stephen Olney House	Capt. Stephen Olney House	May 1, 1974 (#74000003)	138 Smithfield Rd. 41°51′19″N 71°27′05″W	North Providence	
119	Pascoag Grammar School	Pascoag Grammar School	November 21, 2006 (#06001062)	265 Sayles Ave. 41°57′46″N 71°42′18″W	Burrillville	
120	Patterson Brothers Commercial Building and House	Patterson Brothers Commercial Building and House	June 10, 1993 (#93000502)	157, 159, and 161 Broad St. 41°54′10″N 71°23′32″W	Cumberland	Demolished 1998. Hardware store stands on the site.
121	Pawtuxet Village Historic District	Pawtuxet Village Historic District	April 24, 1973 (#73000050)	Bounded roughly by Bayside, S. Atlantic, and Ocean Aves., the Pawtuxet and Providence rivers, and Post Rd. 41°45′49″N 71°23′27″W	Cranston	
122	Phillipsdale Historic District	Phillipsdale Historic District	September 15, 2011 (#11000675)	Roughly bounded by Seekonk River, Roger Williams Ave. & Ruth Ave. 41°50′52″N 71°21′55″W	East Providence	
123	Pocasset Worsted Company Mill	Pocasset Worsted Company Mill	July 19, 2010 (#10000471)	75 Pocasset St. 41°47′50″N 71°28′34″W	Johnston	
124	Pomham Rocks Light Station	Pomham Rocks Light Station	July 9, 1979 (#79000001)	Riverside Rd. 41°46′40″N 71°22′13″W	East Providence	
125	Potter–Remington House		December 28, 1978 (#78000006)	571 Natick Rd. 41°44′30″N 71°29′35″W	Cranston	
126	Pullen Corner School	Pullen Corner School	August 30, 1984 (#84002039)	Angell and Whipple; 41°53′44″N 71°28′06″W	Lincoln	
127	Rhodes-on-the Pawtuxet Ballroom and Gazebo	Rhodes-on-the Pawtuxet Ballroom and Gazebo	December 12, 1978 (#78000007)	Rhodes Pl. 41°46′04″N 71°23′32″W	Cranston	
128	Richmond Paper Company Mill Complex	Richmond Paper Company Mill Complex	November 1, 2006 (#06000974)	310 Bourne Ave. 41°50′31″N 71°22′14″W	East Providence	
129	Rosedale Apartments	Rosedale Apartments	April 10, 2007 (#07000301)	1180 Narragansett Boulevard; 41°46′57″N 71°23′34″W	Cranston	
130	Rose Land Park Plat Historic District	Rose Land Park Plat Historic District	November 19, 2015 (#15000830)	Florence St., Roseland Ct., Dartmouth, Princeton & Willett Aves. 41°46′09″N 71°21′03″W	East Providence	
131	Rumford Chemical Works and Mill House Historic District	Rumford Chemical Works and Mill House Historic District	November 28, 1980 (#80000007)	N. Broadway, Newman, and Greenwood Aves. 41°50′22″N 71°21′16″W	East Providence	
132	Rumford Historic District	Rumford Historic District	November 28, 1980 (#80000008)	Pleasant St. and Greenwood and Pawtucket Aves; 41°49′50″N 71°20′55″W	East Providence	Boundary changes approved August 6, 2018
133	St. Joseph's Church Complex	St. Joseph's Church Complex	August 12, 1982 (#82000007)	1303–1317 Mendon Rd. 41°56′03″N 71°25′40″W	Cumberland	
134	St. Mary's Episcopal Church	St. Mary's Episcopal Church	November 28, 1980 (#80000009)	83 Warren Ave. 41°49′01″N 71°22′54″W	East Providence	
135	St. Matthew's Church	St. Matthew's Church	April 6, 1979 (#79000008)	Dexter and W. Hunt Sts. 41°53′21″N 71°24′07″W	Central Falls	
136	Saint Thomas Episcopal Church and Rectory	Saint Thomas Episcopal Church and Rectory	July 2, 1987 (#87000993)	Putnam Pike; 41°52′16″N 71°33′12″W	Smithfield	
137	Sassafras Site, RI-55	Sassafras Site, RI-55	November 1, 1984 (#84000360)	Between Albion Rd. and the Blackstone River; 41°57′08″N 71°27′03″W	Lincoln	
138	Saylesville Historic District	Saylesville Historic District	August 30, 1984 (#84002049)	Roughly bounded by Memorial Ave., Scotts Road, Industrial Circle, Smithfield Ave., and Woodland Court; 41°53′33″N 71°24′37″W	Lincoln	
139	Saylesville Meetinghouse	Saylesville Meetinghouse	November 28, 1978 (#78000008)	Smithfield Ave. 41°54′02″N 71°25′06″W	Lincoln	
140	Second Battle of Nipsachuck Battlefield	Second Battle of Nipsachuck Battlefield	August 22, 2016 (#16000563)	Address Restricted	North Smithfield	Site of a battle during King Philip's War.
141	Sheldon House	Sheldon House	January 5, 1989 (#88001123)	458 Scituate Ave. 41°46′47″N 71°29′33″W	Cranston	
142	Slatersville Historic District	Slatersville Historic District	April 24, 1973 (#73000002)	Main, Green, Church, and School Sts. and Ridge Rd. 41°59′53″N 71°34′57″W	North Smithfield	
143	Joseph Smith House	Joseph Smith House	November 28, 1978 (#78000009)	109 Smithfield Rd. 41°51′22″N 71°27′00″W	North Providence	
144	Smith–Appleby House	Smith–Appleby House	May 1, 1974 (#74000005)	Stillwater Rd. southeast of its junction with Capron Rd. 41°54′07″N 71°31′06″W	Smithfield	
145	Smithfield Exchange Bank	Smithfield Exchange Bank	April 19, 2006 (#06000295)	599 Putnam Pike; 41°52′26″N 71°33′12″W	Smithfield	
146	Smithfield Road Historic District	Smithfield Road Historic District	February 18, 1987 (#87000036)	Old Smithfield Rd., just north of Sayles Hill Road; 41°58′02″N 71°29′34″W	North Smithfield	
147	Smithville Seminary	Smithville Seminary	March 29, 1978 (#78003446)	Institute Lane; 41°50′02″N 71°35′00″W	Scituate	
148	Smithville – North Scituate	Smithville – North Scituate	August 29, 1979 (#79000003)	Danielson Pike and W. Greenville Road; 41°50′00″N 71°35′07″W	Scituate	
149	South Central Falls Historic District	South Central Falls Historic District	January 31, 1991 (#91000025)	Roughly bounded by the Central Falls-Pawtucket boundary and Rand, Summit, Dexter and Broad Sts. 41°53′04″N 71°23′28″W	Central Falls	
150	Gov. William Sprague Mansion	Gov. William Sprague Mansion	February 18, 1971 (#71000002)	1351 Cranston St. 41°47′28″N 71°27′24″W	Cranston	
151	Squantum Association	Squantum Association	November 28, 1980 (#80000010)	947 Veterans Memorial Parkway; 41°47′24″N 71°22′25″W	East Providence	
152	Ira B. Sweet House	Ira B. Sweet House	January 15, 2010 (#08000715)	38 Esmond St. 41°52′31″N 71°30′13″W	Smithfield	
153	Moses Taft House	Moses Taft House	March 20, 2009 (#08000718)	111 East Wallum Lake Road; 41°57′59″N 71°43′02″W	Burrillville	
154	Three Dog Site, RI-151	Three Dog Site, RI-151	November 1, 1984 (#84000362)	Off Routes 5/104 near the Smithfield line	North Smithfield	
155	Todd Farm	Todd Farm	February 10, 1983 (#83000004)	670 Farnum Pike; 41°57′57″N 71°32′26″W	North Smithfield	
156	Lewis Tower House	Lewis Tower House	August 30, 1982 (#82000010)	2199 Mendon Rd. 41°57′14″N 71°26′33″W	Cumberland	
157	Tower–Flagg Barn Complex		May 20, 1998 (#98000574)	100 Abbott Run Valley Rd. 41°57′33″N 71°23′34″W	Cumberland	Demolished and replaced by housing development.
158	Union Village Historic District	Union Village Historic District	July 28, 1978 (#78000011)	West of Woonsocket on RI 146A; 41°59′28″N 71°32′13″W	North Smithfield	
159	Valley Falls Mill	Valley Falls Mill	April 26, 1978 (#78000012)	1359 and 1361-63 Broad St. 41°53′55″N 71°23′20″W	Central Falls	Boundary increase December 18, 1978.
160	Phillip Walker House	Phillip Walker House	June 24, 1972 (#72000006)	432 W. Massasoit Ave. 41°49′49″N 71°21′50″W	East Providence	
161	Waterman–Winsor Farm	Waterman–Winsor Farm	June 27, 1980 (#80000012)	79 Austin Ave. 41°52′55″N 71°33′45″W	Smithfield	
162	Westcote	Westcote	August 3, 1988 (#88001126)	101 Mountain Laurel Dr. 41°45′19″N 71°28′21″W	Cranston	
163	Nathan Westcott House	Nathan Westcott House	January 5, 1989 (#88001124)	150 Scituate Ave. 41°46′42″N 71°28′46″W	Cranston	
164	Whipple–Angell–Bennett House	Whipple–Angell–Bennett House	July 28, 1995 (#95000917)	157 Olney Ave. 41°50′57″N 71°27′54″W	North Providence	
165	Whipple–Cullen House and Barn	Whipple–Cullen House and Barn	November 14, 1991 (#91001647)	Old River Rd. south of its junction with George Washington Highway; 41°55′49″N 71°26′31″W	Lincoln	
166	Whipple–Jenckes House	Whipple–Jenckes House	November 5, 1992 (#92001541)	8 Fairhaven Road; 41°57′25″N 71°24′02″W	Cumberland	
167	Whitcomb Farm	Whitcomb Farm	November 28, 1980 (#80000013)	36 Willett Ave. 41°46′37″N 71°21′45″W	East Providence	
168	Stephen Winsor House	Stephen Winsor House	October 6, 1975 (#75000004)	113 Austin Ave. 41°53′08″N 71°33′55″W	Smithfield	Listed at 93 Austin Ave.
169	Arad Wood House	Arad Wood House	August 3, 1988 (#88001125)	407 Pontiac Ave. 41°46′30″N 71°26′18″W	Cranston	
170	Woonasquatucket River Site (RI-163)	Woonasquatucket River Site (RI-163)	November 1, 1984 (#84000364)	near Farnum Pike; 41°54′33″N 71°32′21″W	Smithfield	
171	World War I Memorial	World War I Memorial	October 19, 2001 (#01000466)	Junction of Taunton Ave. and Whelden Ave. 41°49′10″N 71°22′15″W	East Providence	

== See also ==
- List of National Historic Landmarks in Rhode Island
- National Register of Historic Places listings in Rhode Island
