= Norwood Avenue Historic District =

Historic district in Rhode Island, United States

- U.S. National Register of Historic Places
- U.S. Historic district
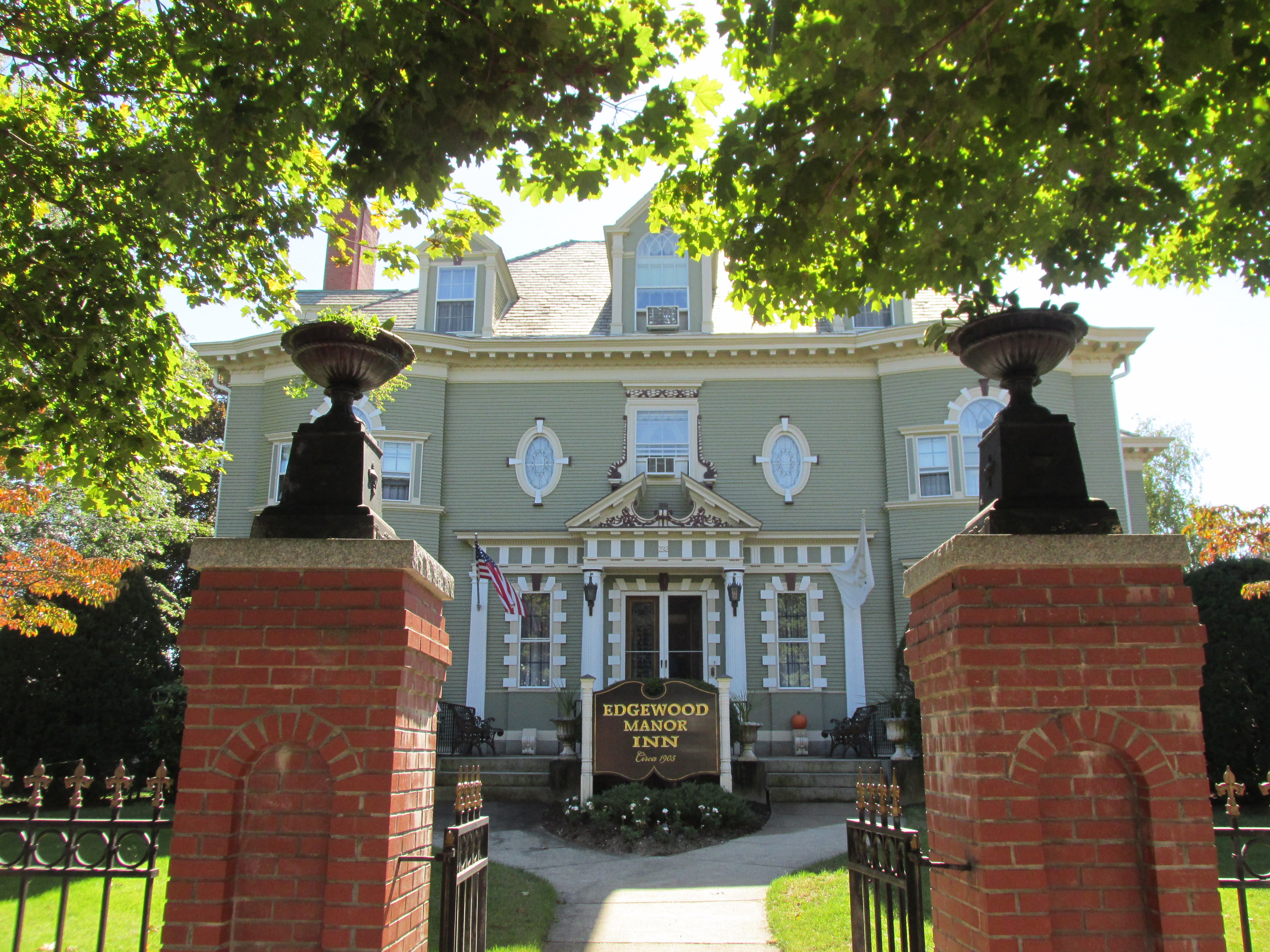
- Edgewood Manor Inn

- Location within Rhode Island Location within the United States
- Location: Cranston, Rhode Island
- Coordinates: 41.77905°N 71.40347°W
- Architect: B. S. D. Martin; William R. Walker & Son
- Architectural style: Queen Anne, Colonial Revival
- NRHP reference No.: 02000412
- Added to NRHP: April 26, 2002

The Norwood Avenue Historic District is a residential historic district in Cranston and Providence, Rhode Island. It includes all the properties along Norwood Avenue between Broad Street in Cranston and Green Boulevard (the eastern edge of Roger Williams Park) in Providence. It is lined with houses built mostly between 1890 and 1930 in the Queen Anne and Colonial Revival styles.

The district is listed on the National Register of Historic Places, starting in 2002.

== See also ==
- National Register of Historic Places listings in Providence, Rhode Island
- National Register of Historic Places listings in Providence County, Rhode Island
