= Sheldon House =

Historic house in Rhode Island, United States

- U.S. National Register of Historic Places
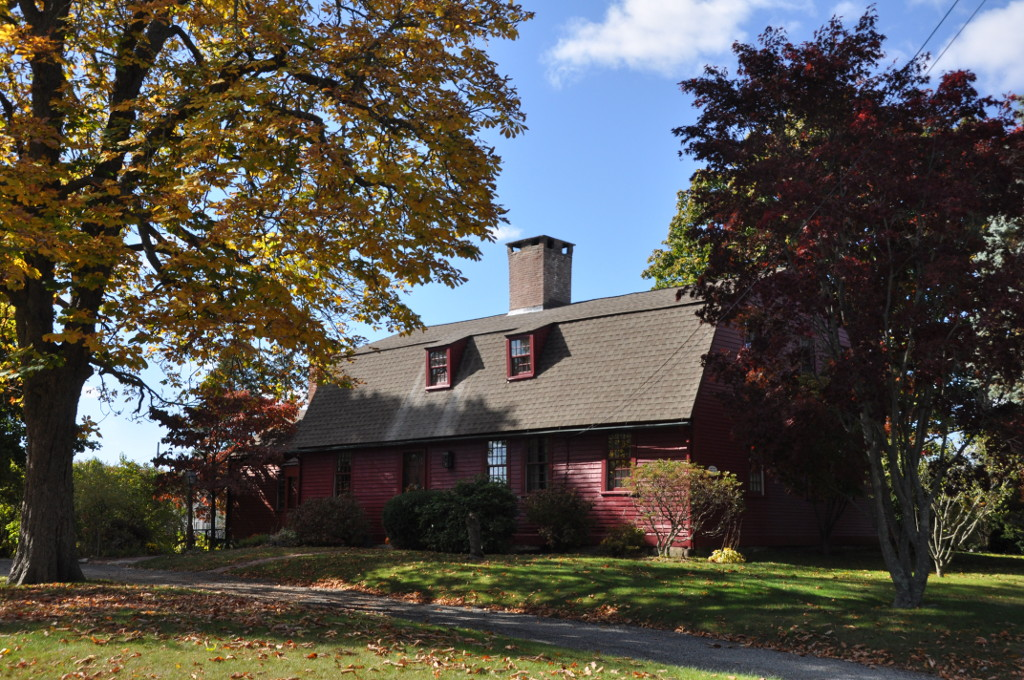

- Location within Rhode Island Location within the United States
- Location: 458 Scituate Road, Cranston, Rhode Island
- Coordinates: 41°46′47″N 71°29′33″W
- Built: 1728
- Architectural style: Colonial
- NRHP reference No.: 88001123
- Added to NRHP: January 5, 1989

The Sheldon House is a historic house located in Cranston, Rhode Island. The house was listed on the National Register of Historic Places on January 5, 1989.

== Description and history ==
The oldest portion of the 1 1/2-story, gambrel-roofed Cape-style house was originally built around 1728. It was probably enlarged in 1764, when it was inherited by Nicholas Sheldon III; the northern half of the house exhibits more sophisticated Georgian detailing than the southern half. The Sheldons were major landowners in Cranston, and built a number of surviving 18th-century houses in the area; this one is the oldest of those.

== See also ==
- National Register of Historic Places listings in Providence County, Rhode Island
