= Arad Wood House =

Historic house in Rhode Island, United States

- U.S. National Register of Historic Places
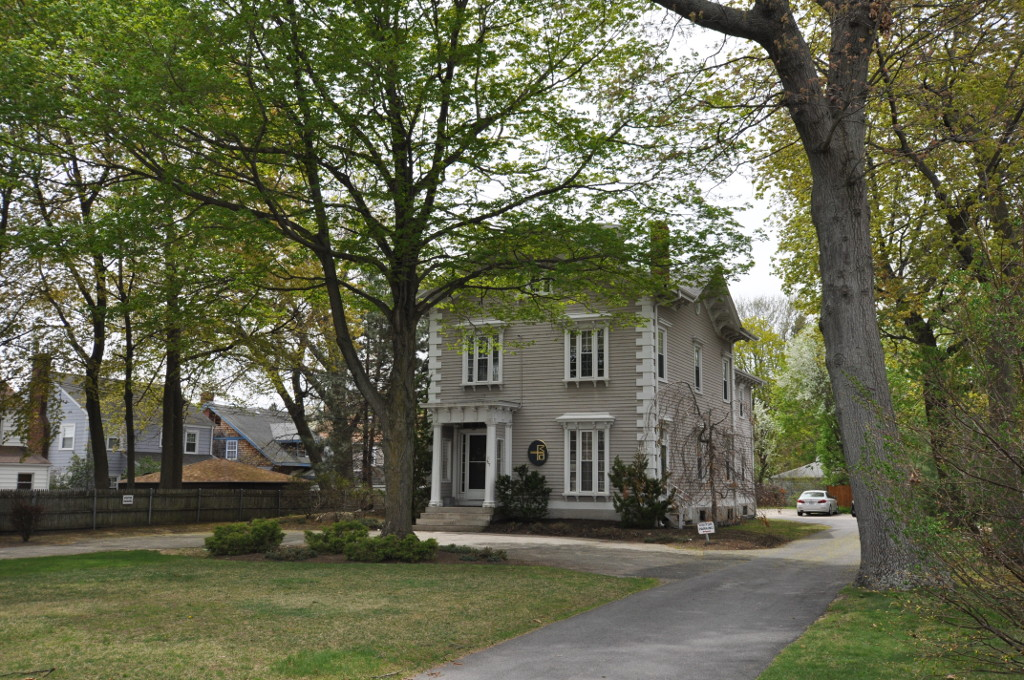

- Location within Rhode Island Location within the United States
- Location: 407 Pontiac Avenue, Cranston, Rhode Island
- Coordinates: 41°46′30″N 71°26′18″W
- Built: 1858
- Architectural style: Italianate
- NRHP reference No.: 88001125
- Added to NRHP: August 3, 1988

The Arad Wood House is an historic house in Cranston, Rhode Island. The 2 1/2-story wood-frame house was built c. 1858 for N. Thornton, and is one Cranston's finest Italianate houses. Although it was built as a farmhouse, it was acquired in the 1890s by Arad Wood, one of Cranston's wealthiest businessmen, who operated a gentleman's farm of several hundred acres. The house was also later the first home of the Cranston chapter of the American Red Cross.

The house was listed on the National Register of Historic Places in 1988.

== See also ==
- National Register of Historic Places listings in Providence County, Rhode Island
