= Cumberland Town Hall Historic District =

Historic district in Rhode Island, United States

- U.S. National Register of Historic Places
- U.S. Historic district
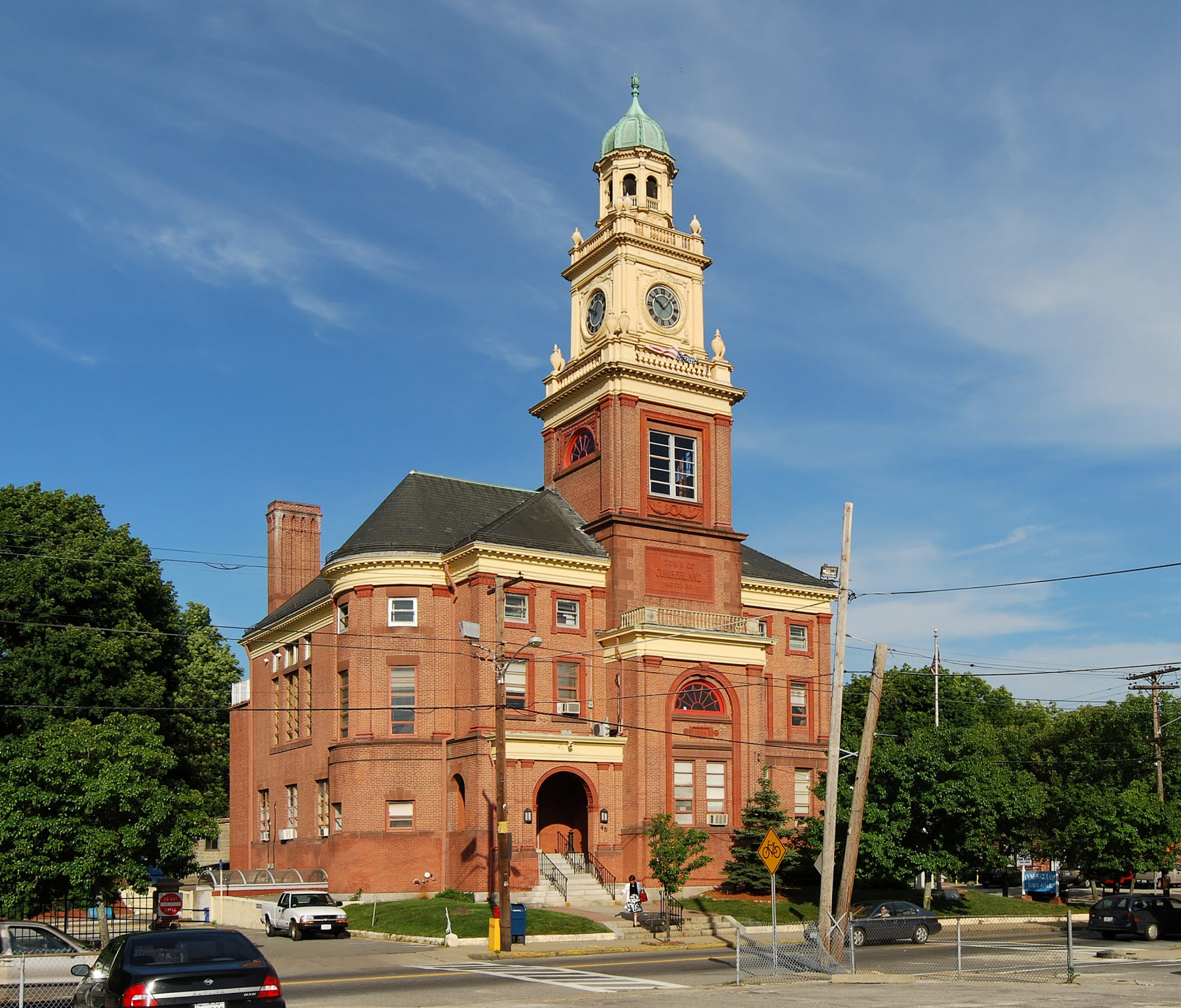
- Cumberland Town Hall

- Location within Rhode Island Location within the United States
- Location: 45 Broad St. and 16 Mill St., Cumberland, Rhode Island
- Coordinates: 41°54′1″N 71°23′27″W
- Area: 1.2 acres (0.49 ha)
- Built: c. 1890; 1894
- Architect: William R. Walker
- Architectural style: Colonial Revival
- NRHP reference No.: 100004532
- Added to NRHP: October 21, 2019

The Cumberland Town Hall District is a historic district encompassing two buildings of civic and architectural significance in Cumberland, Rhode Island. It includes Cumberland's town hall, located at 45 Broad Street in the village of Valley Falls, and an adjacent commercial building at 16 Mill Street, which was historically used for commercial and civic functions. The town hall, built in 1894, was the town's first purpose-built municipal building, and is a prominent example of Colonial Revival architecture, designed by Rhode Island architect William R. Walker. The district was listed on the National Register of Historic Places in 2019.

== Description and history ==
Cumberland Town Hall is located in the town's southernmost village, Valley Falls, at the northeast corner of Broad and Mill Streets. It is a tall three-story structure, its brick walls trimmed with stone and terra cotta. It is capped by a hip roof, and has a three-stage clock tower which is visible for some distance. Adjacent to the town hall at 16 Mill Street is a two-story brick commercial building. It has two store fronts, arrange symmetrically with plate glass display windows at the outside, and recessed two-leaf doorways near the center of the facade. Segmented-arch windows are placed above each storefront, and a corbelled and dentillated parapet tops the building.

After Cumberland was incorporated in 1746, municipal records were typically stored in the clerk's home, and business was conducted in private homes or local commercial spaces. This situation continued through the town's significant industrial and population growth in the 19th century, until 1892, when the town appointed a committee to oversee construction of a town hall. The present structure was completed in 1894, on land given to the town by the Valley Falls Mill Company, its largest industrial concern. It was designed by William R. Walker, a prominent Rhode Island architect, and was stylistically similar to the town hall of Warwick. The adjacent commercial building had been built about 1890 by the Valley Falls Company to house a company store and the local library. The retail space was repurposed to house the Valley Falls post office, which had been displaced by the construction of the town hall.

== See also ==
- National Register of Historic Places listings in Providence County, Rhode Island
