= Cornell-Randall-Bailey Roadhouse =

- U.S. National Register of Historic Places
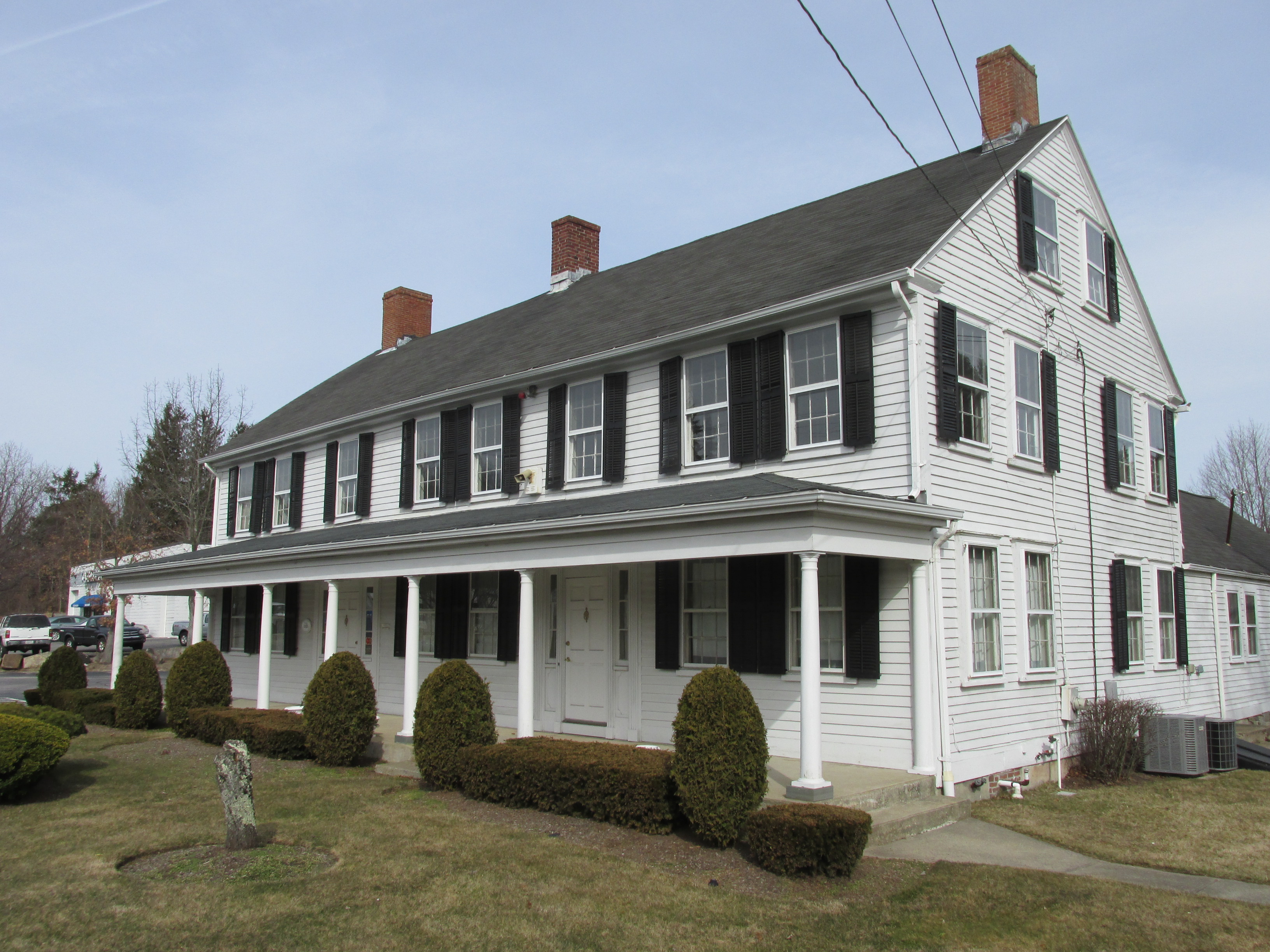
- Cornell-Randall-Bailey Roadhouse

- Location within Rhode Island Location within the United States
- Location: Johnston, Rhode Island
- Coordinates: 41°49′57″N 71°33′29″W
- Built: 1799
- NRHP reference No.: 84001943
- Added to NRHP: May 10, 1984

The Cornell—Randall—Bailey Roadhouse (also known as the Log Gift and Curtain Shoppe) is an historic building located at 2737 Hartford Avenue (United States Route 6) in western Johnston, Rhode Island. The oldest portion of this 2 1/2-story wood-frame structure was built in the late 18th century by Samuel Steere, and was substantially enlarged for use as a tavern in 1821 by Daniel Cornell. Business at the tavern declined when railroads rendered the highway less important, and the building was adapted for use as a bordello and gambling house in the early 20th century. In the 1970s it was converted for use as a gift shop.

The Cornell-Randall-Bailey Roadhouse is significant- to the history of architecture as a fairly well-preserved example of a commercial structure.

The building was listed on the National Register of Historic Places on May 10, 1984.

== See also ==
- National Register of Historic Places listings in Providence County, Rhode Island
