= Lymansville Company Mill =

- U.S. National Register of Historic Places
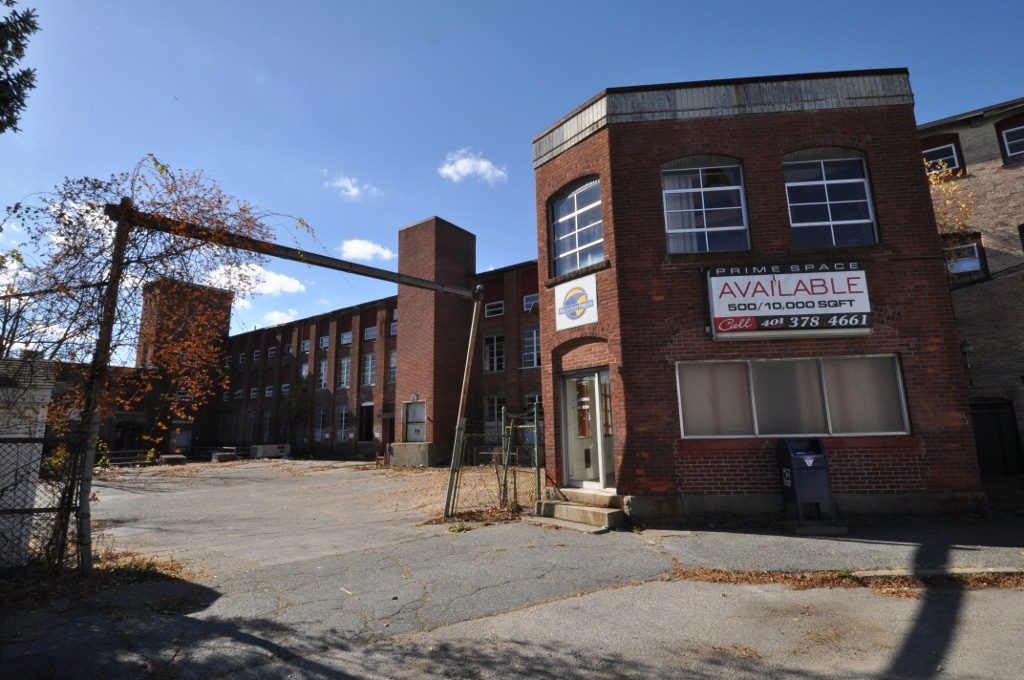

- Location within Rhode Island Location within the United States
- Location: 184 Woonasquatucket Avenue, North Providence, Rhode Island
- Coordinates: 41°50′21″N 71°28′32″W
- Area: 13 acres (5.3 ha)
- Built: 1884
- Architect: A. Albert Sack
- NRHP reference No.: 12001098
- Added to NRHP: December 26, 2012

The Lymansville Company Mill is a historic industrial complex at 184 Woonasquatucket Avenue in North Providence, Rhode Island. The oldest portion of the complex, a three-story brick building which originally a textile spinning and carding building, was built in 1884. The mill was significantly expanded in subsequent years, with its last addition taking place in 1951. The Lymansville Company was founded in 1884 and closed in 1957. Auguste Albert Sack, the leading partner in the company, was a German immigrant with significant work experience in New England's textile industry.

The complex was listed on the National Register of Historic Places in 2012.

In 2016, a developer announced a $14-million plan to develop 101 apartments in the complex. The plan received a state historic building tax credit, as well as town tax incentives.

== See also ==
- National Register of Historic Places listings in Providence County, Rhode Island
