= Ochee Spring Quarry =

- U.S. National Register of Historic Places
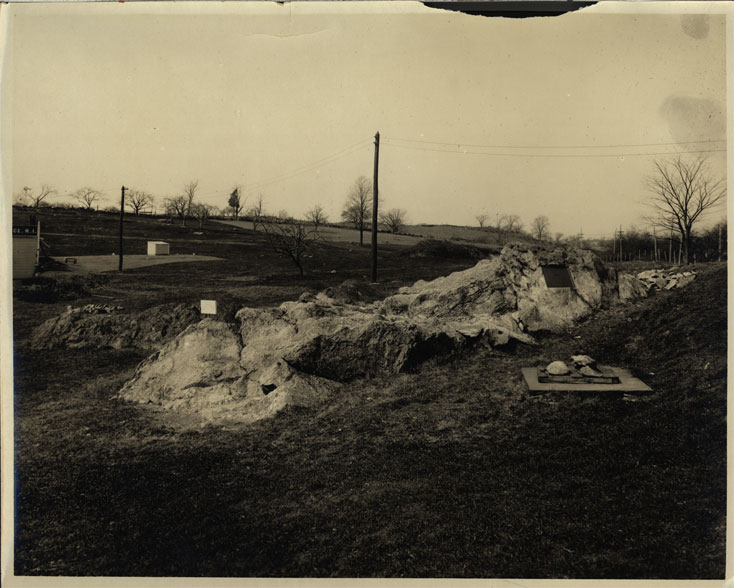
- Site of the quarry, c. 1920
- Nearest city: Johnston, Rhode Island
- NRHP reference No.: 78000003
- Added to NRHP: May 5, 1978

Ochee Spring Quarry is an historic quarry in Johnston, Rhode Island. Located on a privately owned outcrop of land behind 787 Hartford Avenue (United States Route 6), the quarry was a source of steatite (soapstone), a relatively soft stone easily workable into containers. Native Americans are known to have used this quarry. A study of the site conducted in the mid-1980s concluded that the quarry was probably worked in an organized manner, to produce containers in a variety of sizes. Items made from this quarry have been found across southern New England.

The quarry was listed on the National Register of Historic Places in 1978.

== See also ==
- National Register of Historic Places listings in Providence County, Rhode Island
