= Ballou–Weatherhead House =

Historic house in Rhode Island, United States

- U.S. National Register of Historic Places
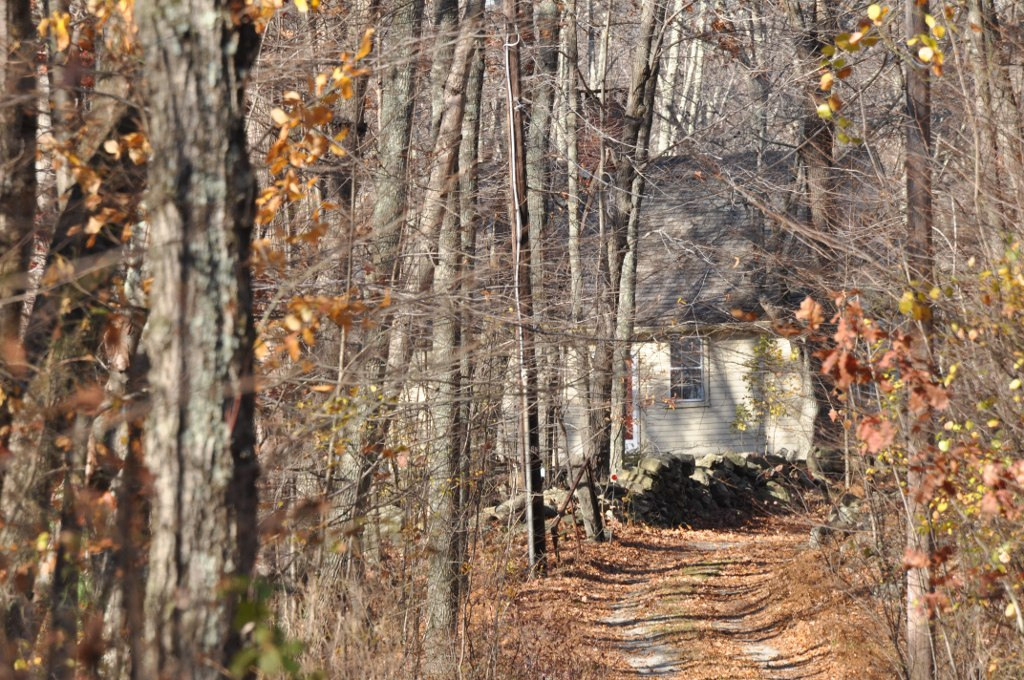

- Location within Rhode Island Location within the United States
- Nearest city: Cumberland Hill, Rhode Island
- Coordinates: 41°59′47″N 71°26′38″W
- Area: 2.5 acres (1.0 ha)
- Built: 1748
- Architectural style: Colonial, Federal
- NRHP reference No.: 93000503
- Added to NRHP: June 25, 1993

The Ballou–Weatherhead House (or "Welcome Weatherhead House") is an historic house on Tower Hill Road in Cumberland, Rhode Island. The house is a 1 1/2-story, center-chimney dwelling built on Cumberland Hill around 1748 and expanded during the Federal period, around 1799, at which point the style was changed to Federal architecture. The house has a broad gable roof, a simple entry in the asymmetrical side-gable façade, a central entry at the gable end, and a side wing. The house contains high-quality joinery and trim, likely executed by one of two house-wrights associated with the property.

The house was listed on the National Register of Historic Places on June 25, 1993.

== See also ==
- National Register of Historic Places listings in Providence County, Rhode Island
