= Edgewood Historic District–Taft Estate Plat =

Historic district in Rhode Island, United States

- U.S. National Register of Historic Places
- U.S. Historic district
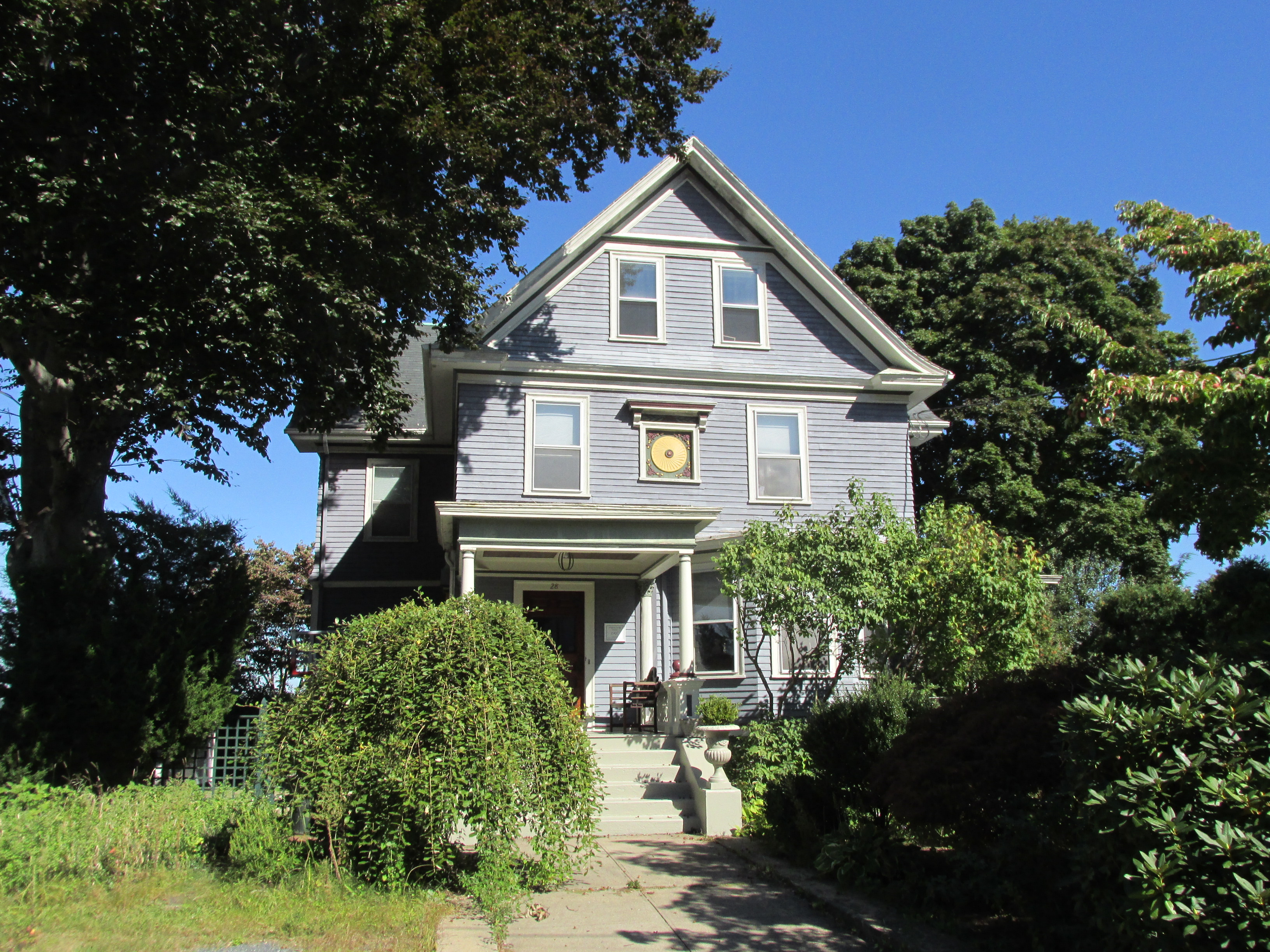
- William Smith House, 28 Selkirk St.

- Location within Rhode Island Location within the United States
- Location: Cranston, Rhode Island
- Coordinates: 41°46′14″N 71°23′27″W
- Area: 16 acres (6.5 ha)
- Architect: Isham, Norman M.
- Architectural style: Queen Anne, Late 19th And 20th Century Revivals
- NRHP reference No.: 03001069 (original); 14001078 (increase)

Significant dates
- Added to NRHP: October 24, 2003
- Boundary increase: December 22, 2014

The Edgewood Historic District–Taft Estate Plat is a historic district in Cranston, Rhode Island that is bounded by Windsor Road, Narragansett Bay, Circuit Drive and Broad Street. The district represents the final subdivision of a country estate amassed by industrialist Orray Taft (1793-1865). It was laid out in 1904 and most of its residential stock was built between 1905 and 1930. The average size of the lots was 5400 square feet, although there was some variance in size, and a one-acre plot was reserved for the Taft mansion (demolished c. 1952 and the land subdivided). The houses are architecturally heterogeneous, reflecting all of the major styles of the period; some properties were designed by Norman Isham.

The district was added to the National Register of Historic Places on October 24, 2003, and was enlarged in 2014 to include the southern part of Stillhouse Cove Reservation, a municipal park. The district abuts the Pawtuxet Village Historic District to the south, whose northernmost properties on Ocean Avenue were also laid out on the former Taft estate.

== See also ==
- National Register of Historic Places listings in Providence County, Rhode Island
