= Westcote (Cranston, Rhode Island) =

Historic house in Rhode Island, United States

- U.S. National Register of Historic Places
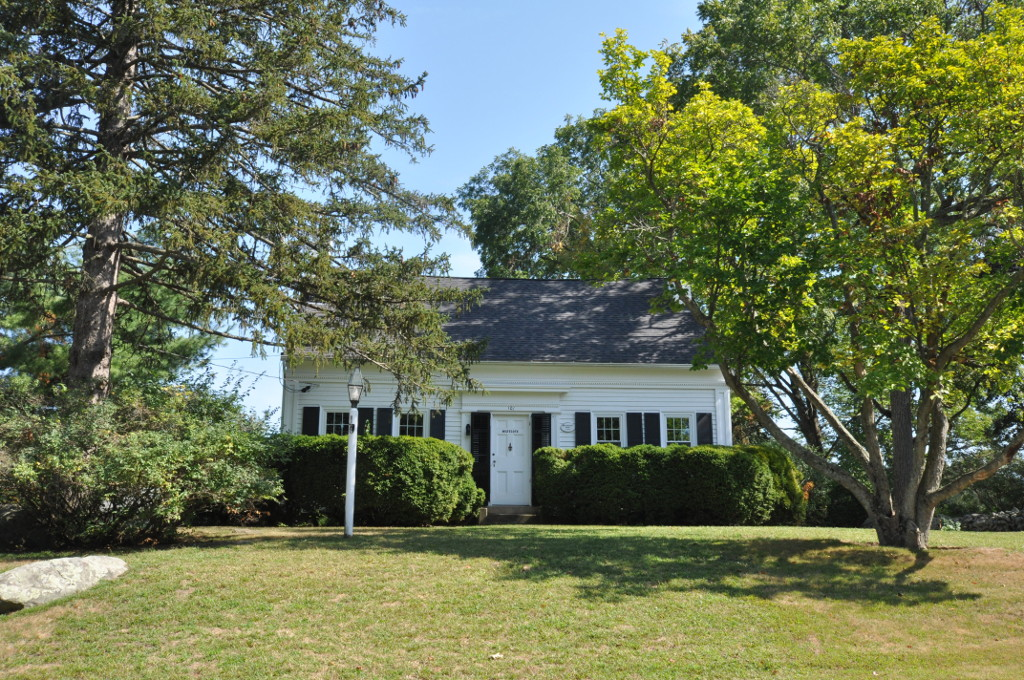

- Location within Rhode Island Location within the United States
- Location: 101 Mountain Laurel Drive, Cranston, Rhode Island
- Coordinates: 41°45′19″N 71°28′21″W
- Built: 1843
- Architectural style: Greek Revival
- NRHP reference No.: 88001126
- Added to NRHP: August 3, 1988

Westcote is a historic house in Cranston, Rhode Island. This 1 1/2-story Greek Revival cottage was built c. 1843, and was originally located on Oaklawn Avenue before being moved to its present location. It was built by a member of the locally prominent Westcott family as a farmhouse, and is a well-preserved and little-altered example of vernacular Greek Revival style.

The house was listed on the National Register of Historic Places in 1988.

== See also ==
- National Register of Historic Places listings in Providence County, Rhode Island
