= Furnace Hill Brook Historic and Archeological District =

Historic district in Rhode Island, United States

- U.S. National Register of Historic Places
- U.S. Historic district
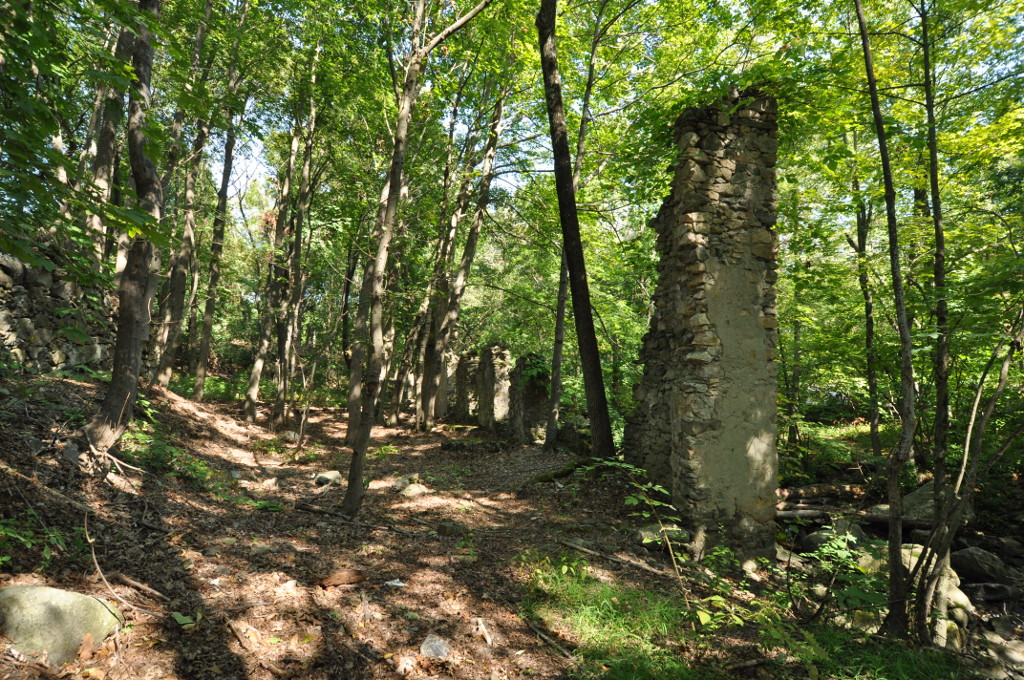
- Nearest city: Cranston, Rhode Island
- Built: 1800
- Architectural style: Greek Revival
- NRHP reference No.: 80000097
- Added to NRHP: August 6, 1980

The Furnace Hill Brook Historic and Archeological District in a historic district in Cranston, Rhode Island.

The site features archaeological industrial remains dating from the early 19th century, as well as a series of prehistoric Native American settlements, dating from the Late Archaic to the Early Woodland periods. One major locus of the Native settlements, a knoll at the confluence of Furnace Hill Brook, Church Brook, and Meshanticut Brook, was destroyed in 1967 by the construction of a highway cloverleaf (the interchange between I-295 and Rhode Island Route 37), although salvage archaeology was successful in obtaining some artifacts. Further up Furnace Hill Brook are the remains of an iron foundry established in 1812.

The site was added to the National Register of Historic Places on August 6, 1980.

== See also ==
- National Register of Historic Places listings in Providence County, Rhode Island
