= Whipple–Angell–Bennett House =

Historic house in Rhode Island, United States

- U.S. National Register of Historic Places
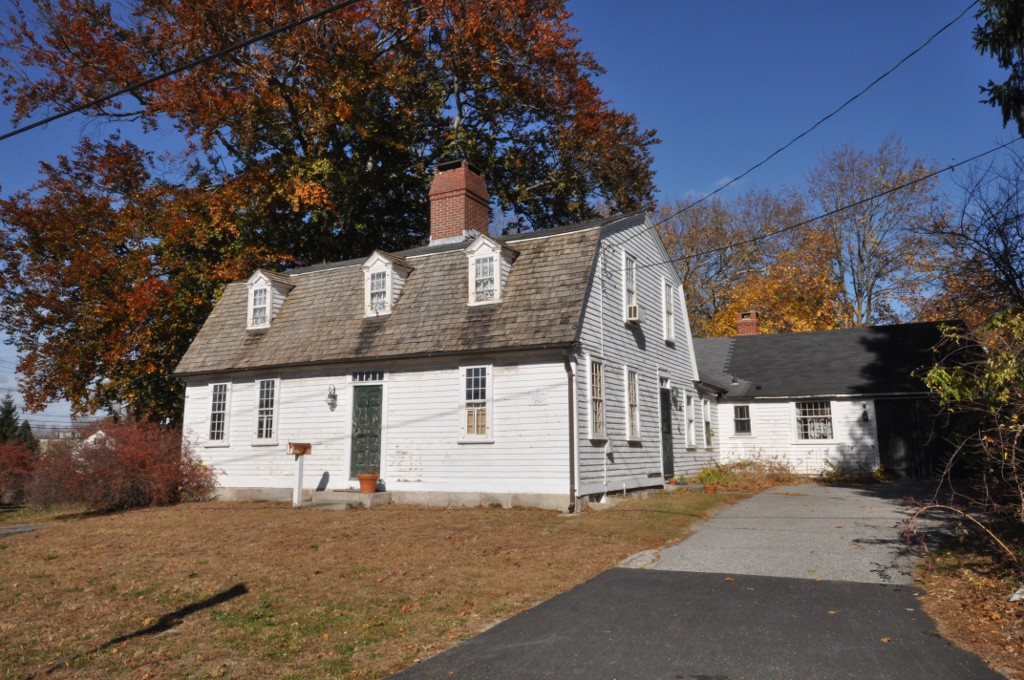

- Location within Rhode Island Location within the United States
- Location: North Providence, Rhode Island
- Coordinates: 41°50′57″N 71°27′54″W
- Built: 1767
- Architectural style: Colonial
- NRHP reference No.: 95000917
- Added to NRHP: July 28, 1995

The Whipple–Angell–Bennett House is an historic house at 157 Olney Avenue in North Providence, Rhode Island. It is a 1 1/2-story gambrel-roofed wood-frame structure, four bays wide, with a series of additions extending it to the north and east. Built in 1766, it is one of only two surviving gambrel-roofed 18th-century houses in North Providence. Its additions exhibit the adaptive reuse of and changes in vernacular style in the 19th and early 20th centuries. The interior of the house has retained a great deal of integrity, with original woodwork, plasterwork, and door hardware.

The house was listed on the National Register of Historic Places in 1995.

== See also ==
- National Register of Historic Places listings in Providence County, Rhode Island
