= Otis Angell Gristmill =

- U.S. National Register of Historic Places
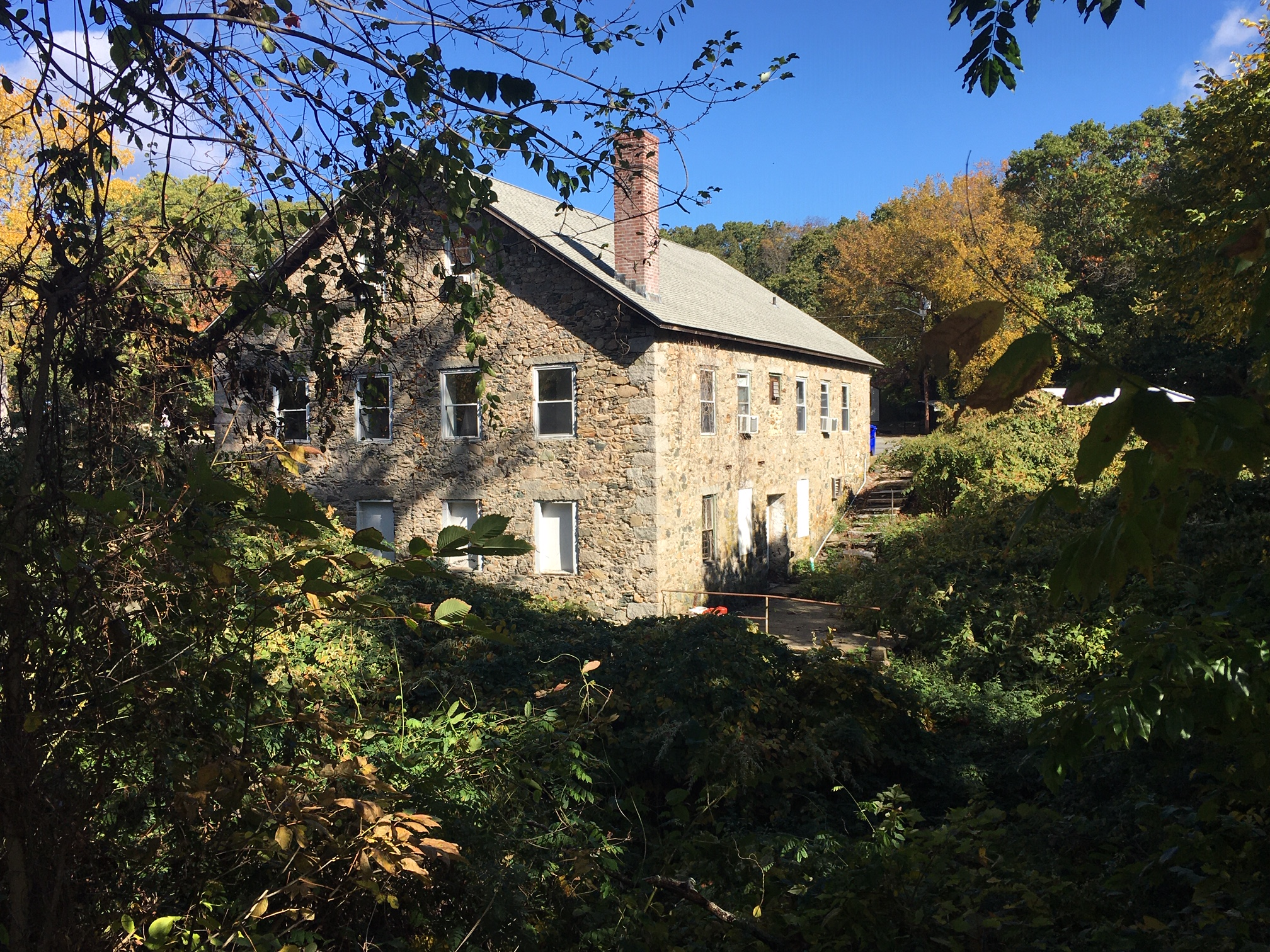

- Location within Rhode Island Location within the United States
- Location: Governor John Notte Memorial Park, North Providence, Rhode Island
- Coordinates: 41°52′13″N 71°27′39″W
- Area: 1.25 acres (0.51 ha)
- Built: c. 1855
- NRHP reference No.: 100001779
- Added to NRHP: November 3, 2017

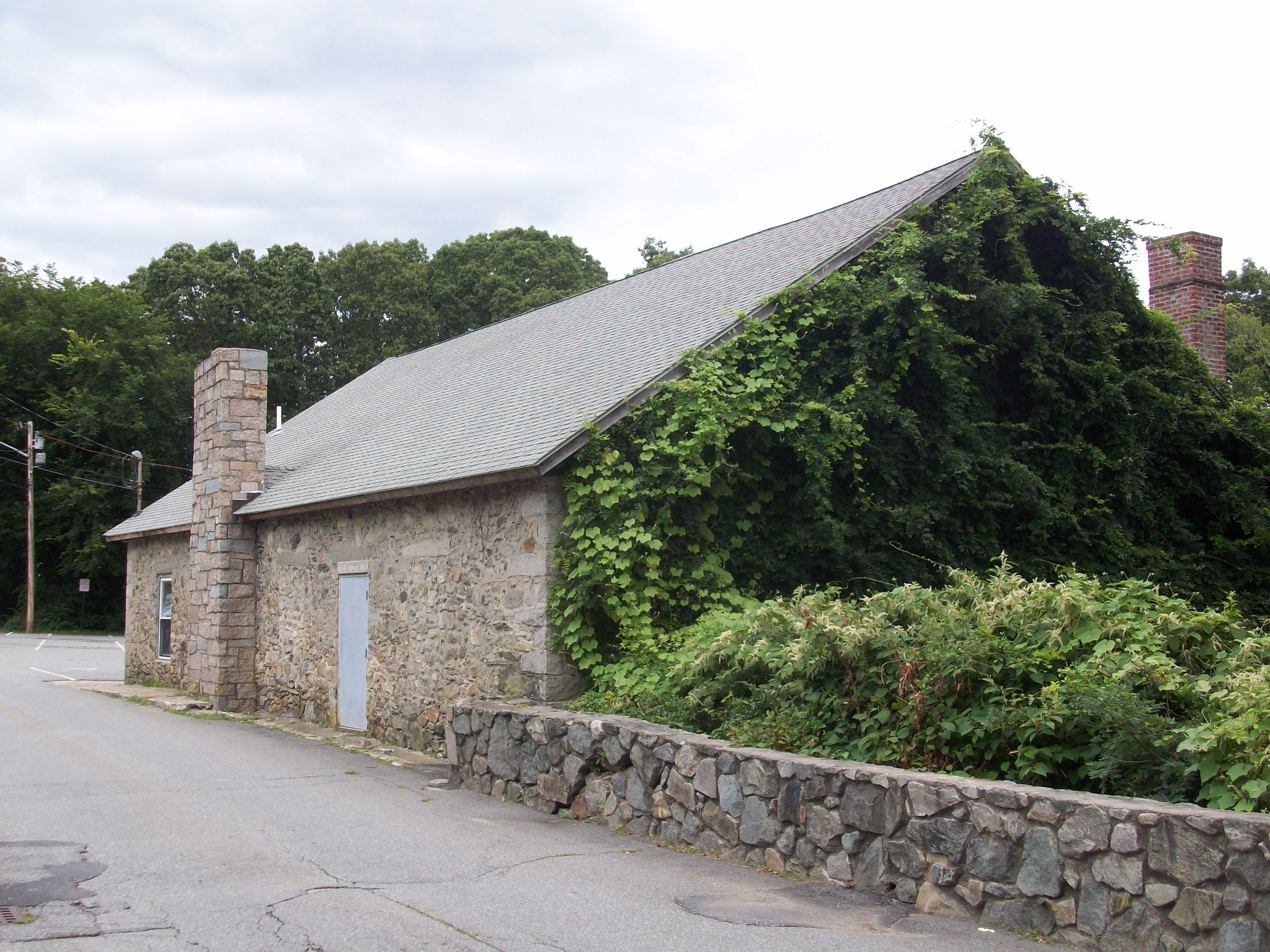
Otis Angell Gristmill SW side

The Otis Angell Gristmill is a historic mill in Governor John Notte Memorial Park, North Providence, Rhode Island. Built about 1855, it is a well-preserved example of a small 19th-century industrial site, with a stone mill building and a small mill pond. The site was added to the National Register of Historic Places in 2017. The mill building now serves as a local community center.

== Description and history ==
The Otis Angell Gristmill stands in north-central North Providence, on the south side of Governor John Notte Memorial Park, one of the town's few public parks. It is a 1-1/2 story masonry structure, built out of uncoursed fieldstone with rough-cut granite corner quoining. It is covered by a gabled roof with a wooden cornice. It has two chimneys, one of brick piercing the roof, and one exterior stone chimney. The main facade faces northeast, and is three bays wide, with a center entrance set in a brick-framed opening with an segmental arch at the top. The flanking window bays have been infilled with stone. There is a service entrance in the gable, historically used for loading materials into the attic level; it is now accessible by an outside staircase. Just to the north of the mill, across the Governor Notte Parkway, is the mill pond. The parkway crosses along the approximate route of what was formerly the mill's main spillway, and is now a culvert over the West River.

The site was undeveloped industrially when it was purchased by Otis Angell in 1853. Within the next two years, Angell had dammed the West River (creating the mill pond), and built a house and this mill building. Angell sold the property to Sarah and Thomas Pray in 1866; Sarah was a cousin, and Thomas was a textile manufacturer from Killingly, Connecticut. During his period of ownership, Angell perfected a new type of turbine, for which he was awarded a patent in 1869. The Prays leased the property to James Hilton, who operated a bleachery on the premises from 1868 to 1872. In that year Pray sold the property his daughter Sarah and her husband Henry Randall Hill. Hill was primarily a farmer, also active in local civic affairs, but the mill continued to see some industrial use.

The mill area was purchased about 1936 by the Geneva Sportsmens' Club, which used the building as a clubhouse until 2012. It was then acquired by the town, as part of a bid to preserve one of its few remaining open spaces. It is now used as a community and event center.

== See also ==
- National Register of Historic Places listings in Providence County, Rhode Island
