= Andrews Mill Company Plant =

- U.S. National Register of Historic Places
- Location within Rhode Island Location within the United States
- Location: 761 Great Rd., North Smithfield, Rhode Island
- Coordinates: 42.00052°N 71.5534°W
- Area: 32 acres (13 ha)
- Built: 1918
- Architect: Dwight Seabury
- Architectural style: Vernacular Industrial
- NRHP reference No.: 100002937
- Added to NRHP: September 13, 2018

The Andrews Mill Company Plant is a historic industrial complex at 761 Great Road in North Smithfield, Rhode Island. Built beginning in 1918, it was home to a maker of French worsted wool textiles, part of a major industrial development push in northern Rhode Island at the time. The complex was listed on the National Register of Historic Places in 2018.

== Description and history ==
The former Andrews Mill Company Plant is located in North Smithfield's Branch Village, on the north side of Great Road (Rhode Island Route 146A) a short way east of the Route 146 highway. It is set on 32 acres (13 ha) of land bordered on the north and east by the Branch River, a tributary of the Blackstone River. The complex has three historic buildings: the main weave shed, a connected boiler house, and a freestanding machine shop. The weave shed is a large building that is two stories in height, but presents a single story to the street, due to sloping terrain. The building is notable in part for its late-stage example of a sawtooth roof, a type that was eventually phased out with the advent of improved indoor lighting. There are several other later-20th century buildings on the site that are not historic.

The site has seen industrial uses of some form since at least 1795, when the water power of the river was first harnessed for the manufacture of scythes. Its first use for textile production was about 1870, and a major textile works that operated there was destroyed by fire in 1915. It was purchased in 1918 by the Andrews Mill Company of Frankford, Pennsylvania, the American subsidiary of a French textile manufacturer. Its decision to locate there was based in part on the efforts of Aram Pothier, a French Canadian businessman and politician, and the presence in nearby Woonsocket of a large French-speaking working class. The mill operated only into the 1920s under this ownership, and was acquired by the Uxbridge Worsted Company in 1936. In 1955 it was leased to the Tupper Corporation, maker of Tupperware, which purchased it in 1958. Tupper shuttered the plant in 1994, after which it was used as a recycling plant. As of 2018, it has been vacant for some time.

== See also ==
- National Register of Historic Places listings in Providence County, Rhode Island
