= Lippitt Hill Historic District =

Historic district in Rhode Island, United States

- U.S. National Register of Historic Places
- U.S. Historic district
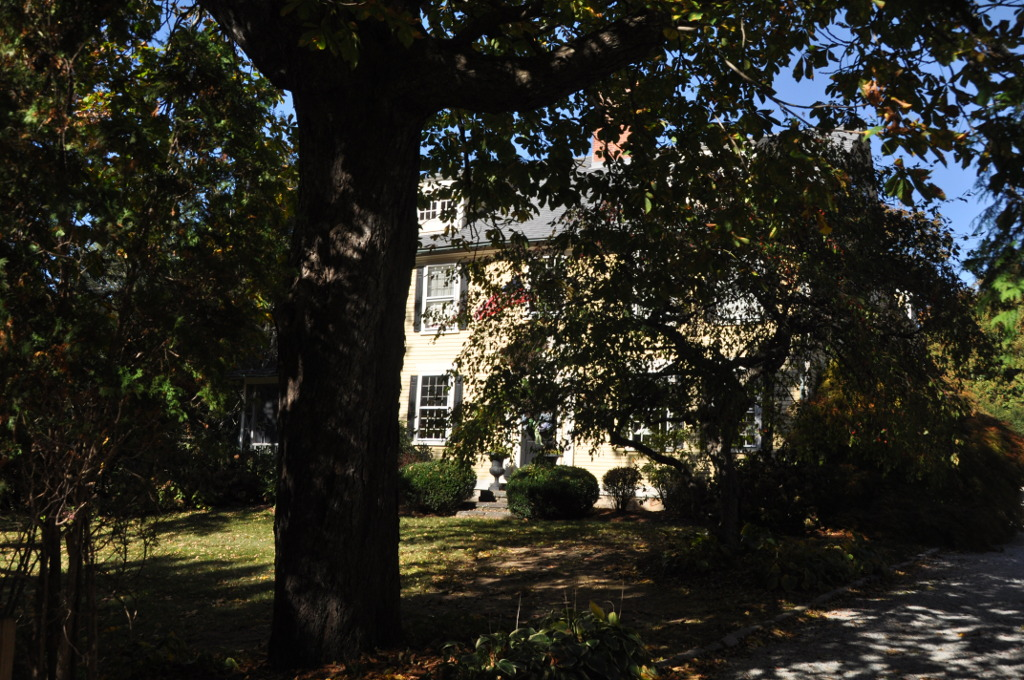

- Location within Rhode Island Location within the United States
- Location: Cranston, Rhode Island
- Coordinates: 41°44′23″N 71°32′6″W
- Area: 140 acres (57 ha)
- Architectural style: Greek Revival, Colonial, Federal
- NRHP reference No.: 89000142
- Added to NRHP: March 2, 1989

The Lippitt Hill Historic District is a historic district in Cranston, Rhode Island along Hope Road between Laten Knight Road and Hope Road's junction with Burlingame Road and Lippitt Avenue. This area was settled by Moses Lippitt, who in 1735 built a Georgian farmhouse for his son Christopher. Christopher later (1805) built a Federal style house for his son William. These two farmhouses are the anchors of this rural district, which also includes a historical cemetery in which many generations of Lippitts are buried, and which features a unique heart-shaped planting of pine trees.

The district was added to the National Register of Historic Places in 1989.

== See also ==
- National Register of Historic Places listings in Providence County, Rhode Island
