= Mathewson Farm =

- U.S. National Register of Historic Places
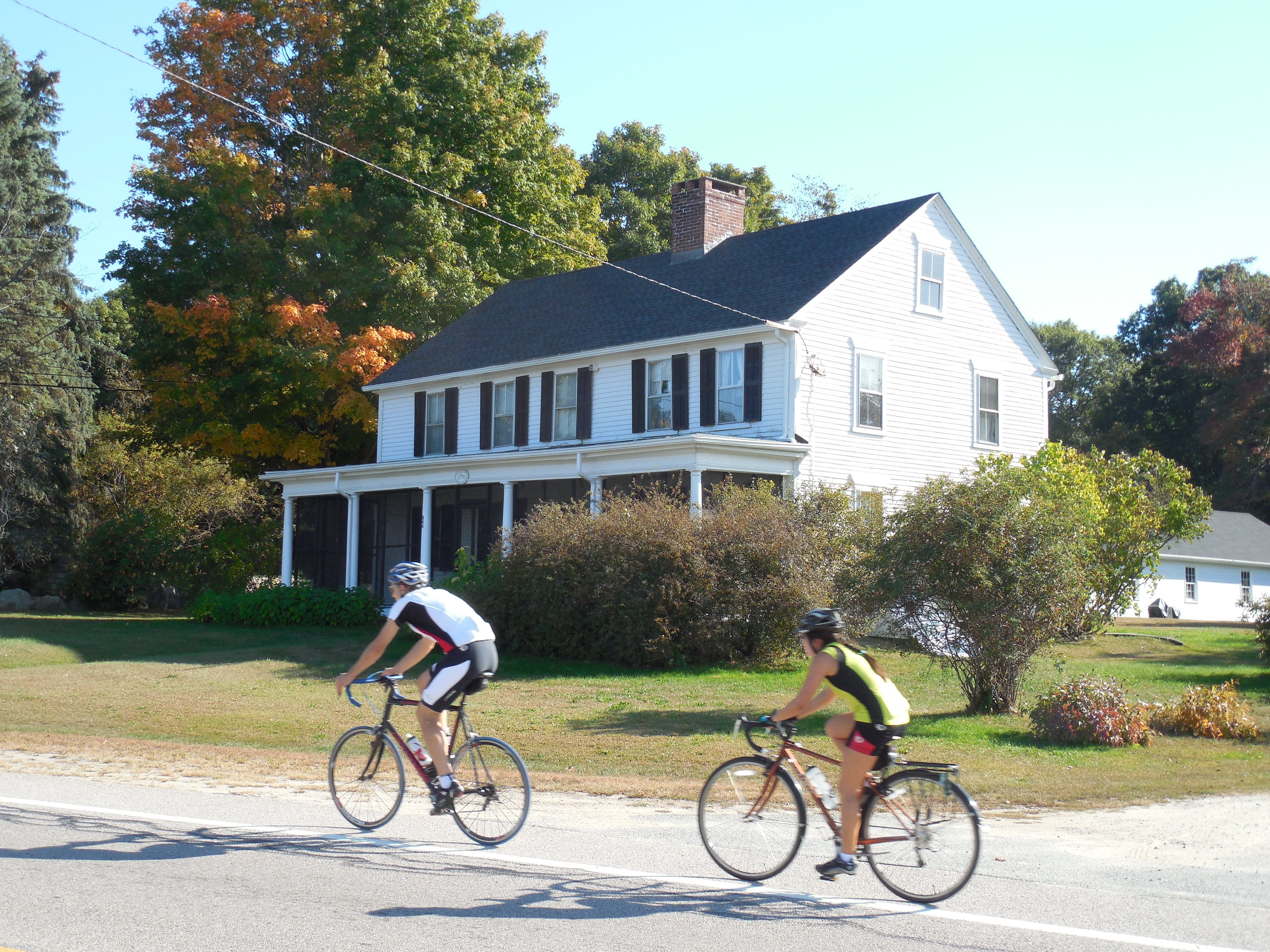
- Mathewson Farm

- Location within Rhode Island Location within the United States
- Location: Johnston, Rhode Island
- Coordinates: 41.84661°N 71.50231°W
- Area: 16.75 acres (6.78 ha)
- Built: 1750
- Architect: Mathewson, William Henry
- Architectural style: Federal
- NRHP reference No.: 01000019
- Added to NRHP: January 26, 2001

The Mathewson Farm is an historic farm on 544 Greenville Avenue in Johnston, Rhode Island. It is an agricultural remnant of the formerly rural village of Belknap. The centerpiece of the farm complex is a late 18th-century farmhouse with vernacular Federal styling. Surviving outbuildings of the farm include a barn from the early 20th century, a henhouse, and a silo. This property was developed as a farm by William Mathewson in the 1790s, and was actively farmed by his descendants until the 1940s.

The farm was added to the National Register of Historic Places in 2001.

== See also ==
- National Register of Historic Places listings in Providence County, Rhode Island
