= Woonasquatucket River Site (RI-163) =

- U.S. National Register of Historic Places
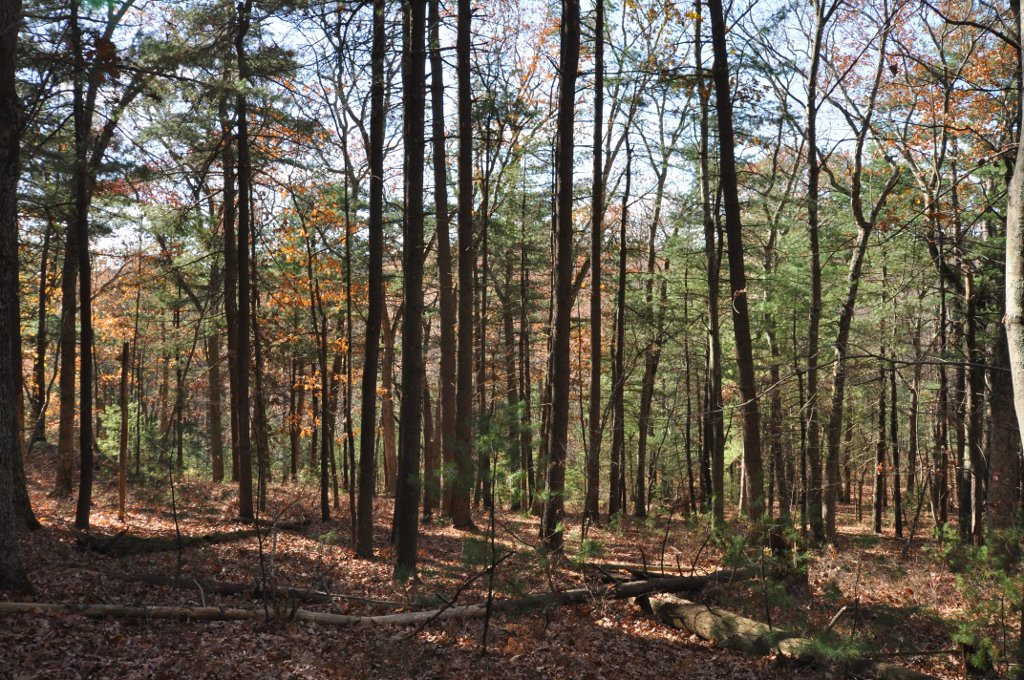
- View of the George Washington Grove area
- Nearest city: Smithfield, Rhode Island
- NRHP reference No.: 84000364
- Added to NRHP: November 1, 1984

The Woonasquatucket River Site (RI-163) (pronounced woo-NAH-skwa-tuck-it) is a prehistoric archaeological site in Smithfield, Rhode Island. The site contains Late Archaic artifacts, primarily stone flakes indicative of stone toolmaking activity. It is located in the George Washington Grove Wildlife Management Area, near where the Farnum Pike crosses the Woonasquatucket River.

== See also ==
- National Register of Historic Places listings in Providence County, Rhode Island
