= Eddy Homestead =

Historic house in Rhode Island, United States

- U.S. National Register of Historic Places
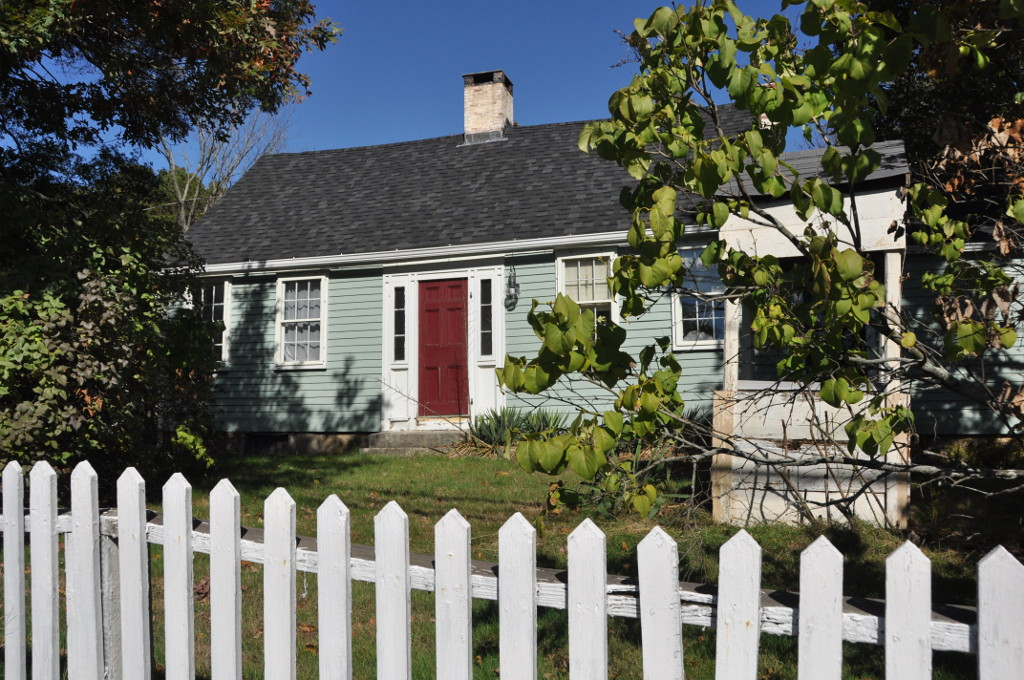

- Location within Rhode Island Location within the United States
- Location: Johnston, Rhode Island
- Coordinates: 41°49′57″N 71°32′56″W
- Built: 1790
- NRHP reference No.: 86001511
- Added to NRHP: August 13, 1986

The Eddy Homestead is a historic house at 2543 Hartford Avenue (United States Route 6) in rural western Johnston, Rhode Island. This 1 1/2-story vernacular wood-frame house is estimated to have been built in the late 18th or early 19th century, and is a well-preserved example of a period farmhouse. It is a floor plan distinctive to western Rhode Island, where the cooking fireplace is located in one of the front rooms, rather than the more typical placement at the rear of the house. The house was in the Eddy family for most of the 19th century.

The house was listed on the National Register of Historic Places in 1986.

== See also ==
- National Register of Historic Places listings in Providence County, Rhode Island
