= Patterson Brothers Commercial Building and House =

Historic commercial building in Rhode Island, United States

- U.S. National Register of Historic Places
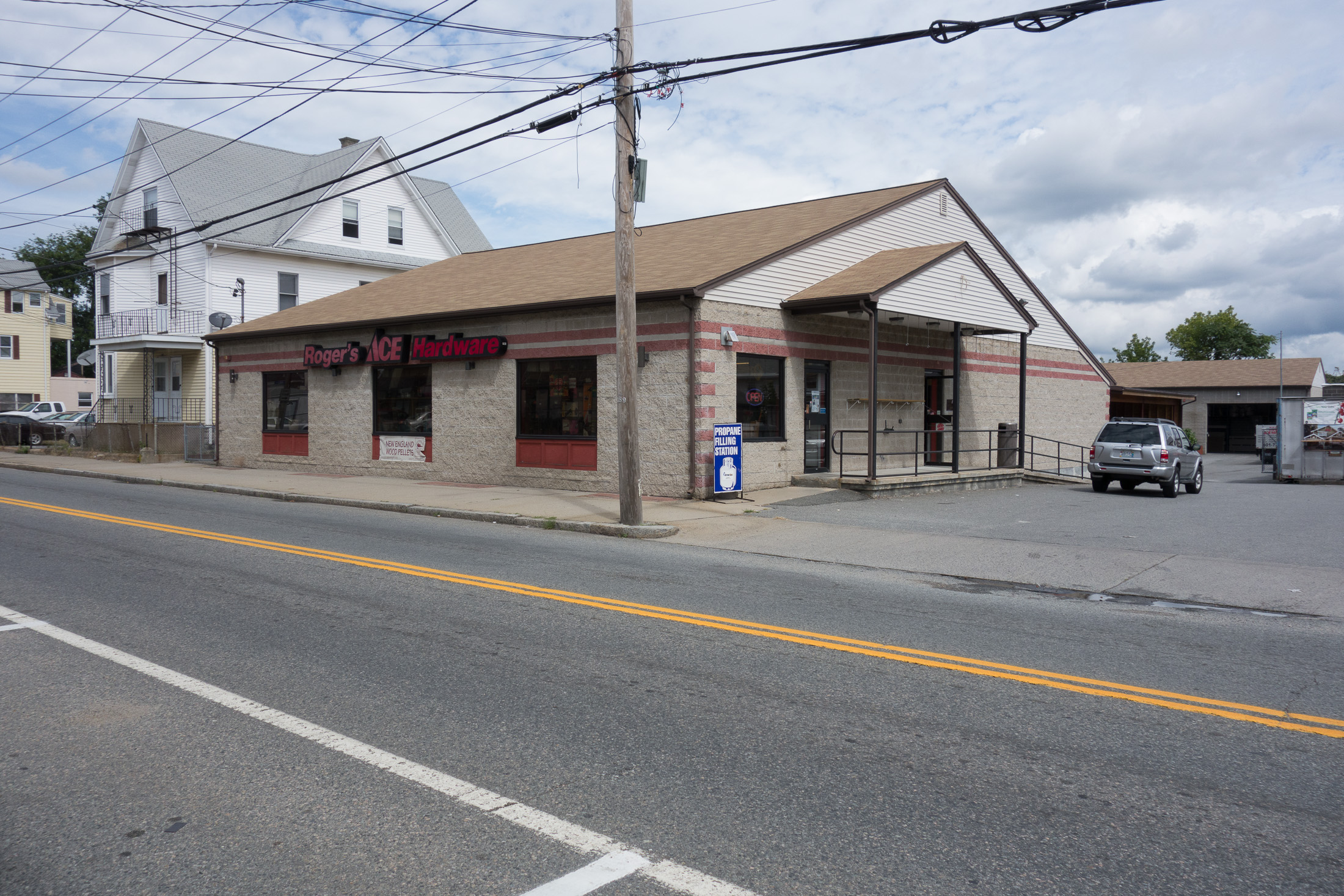
- This hardware store is located at 159-161 Broad Street, the site where Patterson Brothers Commercial Building and House once stood.

- Location within Rhode Island Location within the United States
- Location: 161 Broad Street, Valley Falls, Rhode Island
- Coordinates: 41°54′10″N 71°23′32″W
- Built: 1882
- Architectural style: Italianate
- Demolished: 1998
- NRHP reference No.: 93000502
- Added to NRHP: June 10, 1993

The Patterson Brothers Commercial Building and House (Rogers Hardware) was an historic commercial building in Valley Falls, a village of Cumberland, Rhode Island.

The Italianate building was constructed in 1882 and added to the National Register of Historic Places in 1993. It was demolished in 1998.

== See also ==
- National Register of Historic Places listings in Providence County, Rhode Island
