= Ira B. Sweet House =

Historic house in Rhode Island, United States

- U.S. National Register of Historic Places
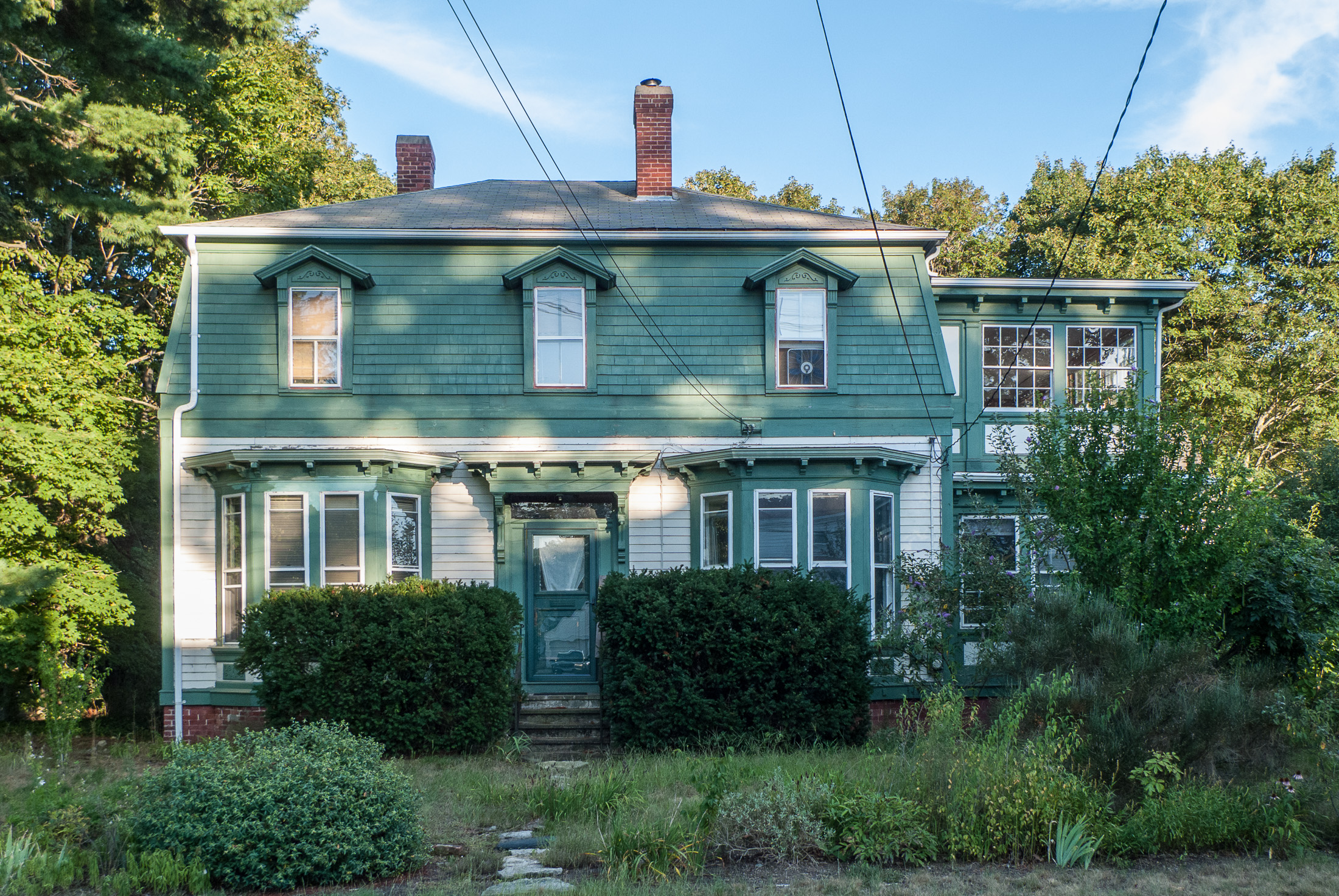
- Ira B. Sweet House in 2013

- Location within Rhode Island Location within the United States
- Location: 38 Esmond St., Smithfield, Rhode Island
- Coordinates: 41°52′31″N 71°30′13″W
- Area: 0.3 acres (0.12 ha)
- Built: 1884
- Architectural style: Second Empire
- NRHP reference No.: 08000715
- Added to NRHP: January 15, 2010

The Ira B. Sweet House is a historic house at 38 Esmond Street in Smithfield, Rhode Island. It is a 1 1/2-story wood-frame structure, with a mansard roof. It was built c. 1884–95, and is an unusually late example of Second Empire styling. Ira Sweet was a local shop owner and the village postmaster until his death c. 1900. The house is three bays wide and two deep, with a center entry flanked by projecting bay sections topped by bracketed eaves. A two-story enclosed porch constructed in 1919 is attached to the right side, and a small addition built in 2006 extend the house further to the rear.

The house was listed on the National Register of Historic Places in 2010.

== See also ==
- National Register of Historic Places listings in Providence County, Rhode Island
