= Angell–Ballou House =

Historic house in Rhode Island, US

- U.S. National Register of Historic Places
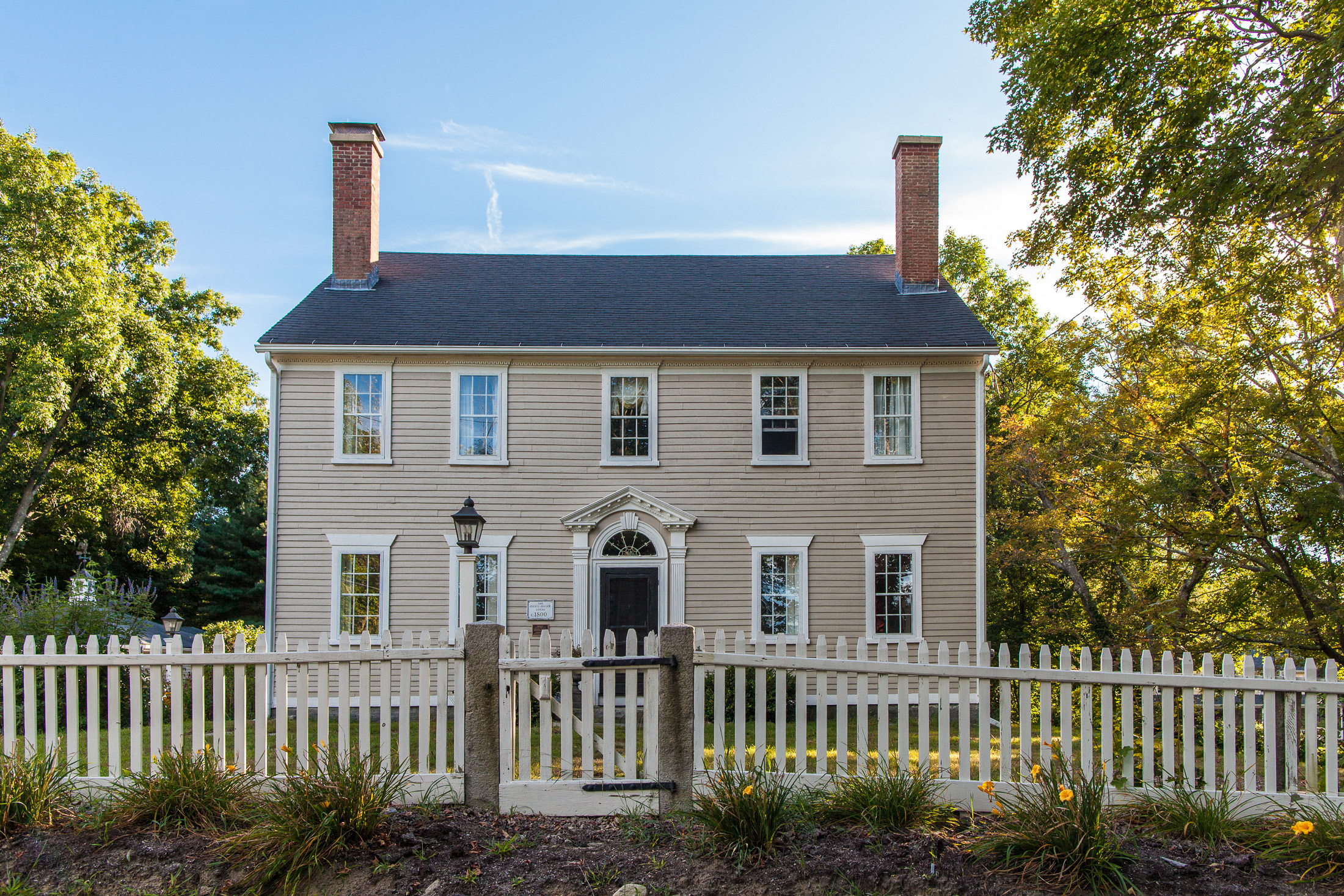
- Angell–Ballou House in 2013

- Location within Rhode Island Location within the United States
- Location: Smithfield, Rhode Island
- Coordinates: 41°53′42″N 71°30′5″W
- Area: 4.33 acres (1.75 ha)
- Built: 1800
- Architectural style: Federal
- NRHP reference No.: 04000196
- Added to NRHP: March 18, 2004

The Angell–Ballou House is an historic house at 49 Ridge Road in Smithfield, Rhode Island, United States. The 2 1/2-story wood-frame structure was built c. 1800 for Jonathan Angell, a farmer and wheelwright. It is a well-preserved example of Federal style, with some high-quality woodwork and design elements more typical of Federal-style houses in sophisticated urban settings, but also showing some vernacular departures from the style. The house was sold in 1854 to Peter Ballou, in whose family it remained well into the 20th century.

The house was listed on the National Register of Historic Places in 2004.

== See also ==
- National Register of Historic Places listings in Providence County, Rhode Island
