= Snake Den State Park =

State park in Providence County, Rhode Island

Snake Den/Dame Farm
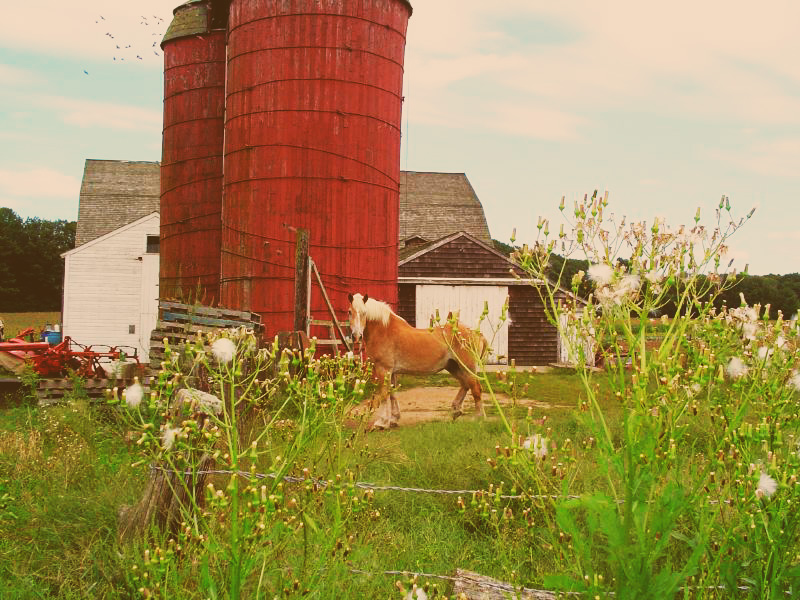
- Dame Farm at Snake Den State Park

- Location within Rhode Island
- Interactive map of Snake Den/Dame Farm
- Location: Johnston, Rhode Island, United States
- Coordinates: 41°50′50″N 71°31′31″W
- Area: 1,000 acres (4.0 km^{2})
- Elevation: 394 ft (120 m)
- Established: 1969
- Named for: A stony fissure
- Administrator: Rhode Island Department of Environmental Management, Division of Parks & Recreation
- Website: Official website
- Rhode Island State Parks

Snake Den State Park is a public recreation area occupying 1,000 acres (400 ha) on U.S. Route 6 in the town of Johnston, Providence County, Rhode Island. The park includes a working farm, Dame Farm, and is largely undeveloped with limited recreational opportunities. The Rhode Island Division of Parks and Recreation is headquartered in the former, 22-room Palazzi family farmhouse. The park is named for a canyon-like fissure on the park grounds.

== History ==
The farm was previously owned by the Steere and Dame families of Johnston. A Steere family cemetery lies within the park. The state purchased the property in 1969 from the Palazzi family, who had preserved the farm in a historic condition that dates back to the 18th century. The park was established to rescue open space in the greater Providence metropolitan area and to preserve part of the state's farming history. A 2005 plan by the state to develop a waterpark at the park was defeated by the citizens of Johnston over traffic concerns. Park plans call for the development of picnic areas and playing fields.

== Recreation ==
The park features walking trails that provide visitors with opportunities to view the farm, foliage, and wildlife.
