= Daniel Angell House =

Historic house in Rhode Island, United States

- U.S. National Register of Historic Places
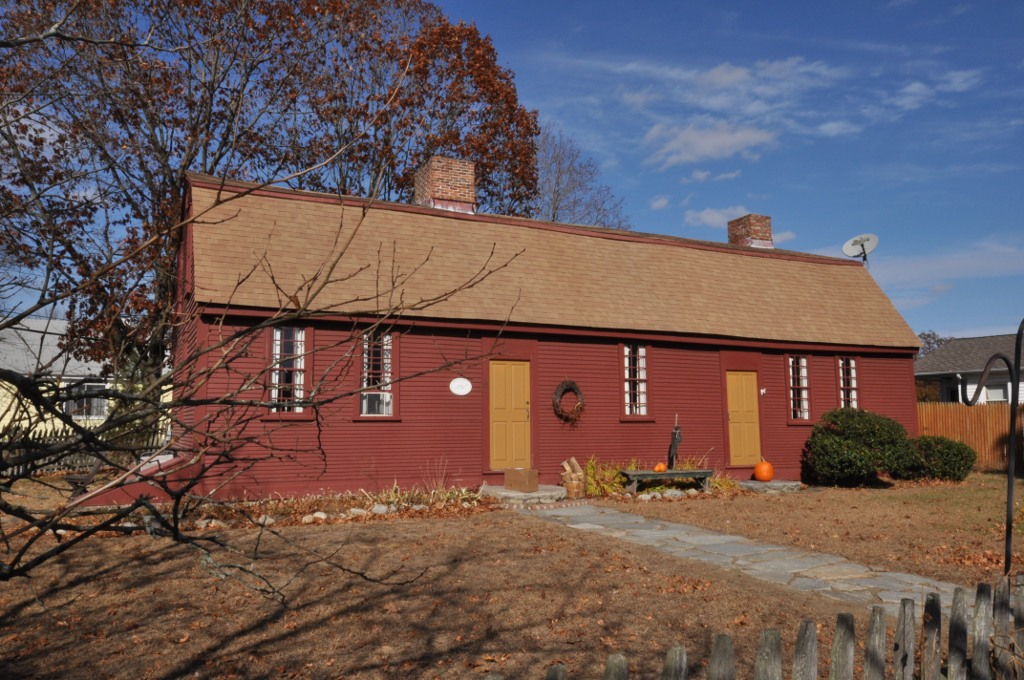

- Location within Rhode Island Location within the United States
- Location: Johnston, Rhode Island
- Coordinates: 41°52′46″N 71°30′1″W
- NRHP reference No.: 75000056
- Added to NRHP: April 21, 1975

The Daniel Angell House is a historic house at 15 Dean Avenue in Johnston, Rhode Island, United States. The oldest portion of this 1 1/2-story wood-frame structure was built c. 1725, although it was long attributed to Daniel Angell (1744-1810). The house has an irregular front facade, seven bays wide, with two doors occupying the third and fifth bays. The western part, likely the oldest portion of the house, has a large chimney centered on five bays. The relatively unusual construction practices used in the house's construction, as well its remarkable state of preservation, make it a valuable resource in the study of Rhode Island colonial architecture.

The house was listed on the National Register of Historic Places in 1975.

== See also ==
- National Register of Historic Places listings in Providence County, Rhode Island
