= Cumberland Hill, Rhode Island =

Census-designated place in Rhode Island, United States

- Census-designated place
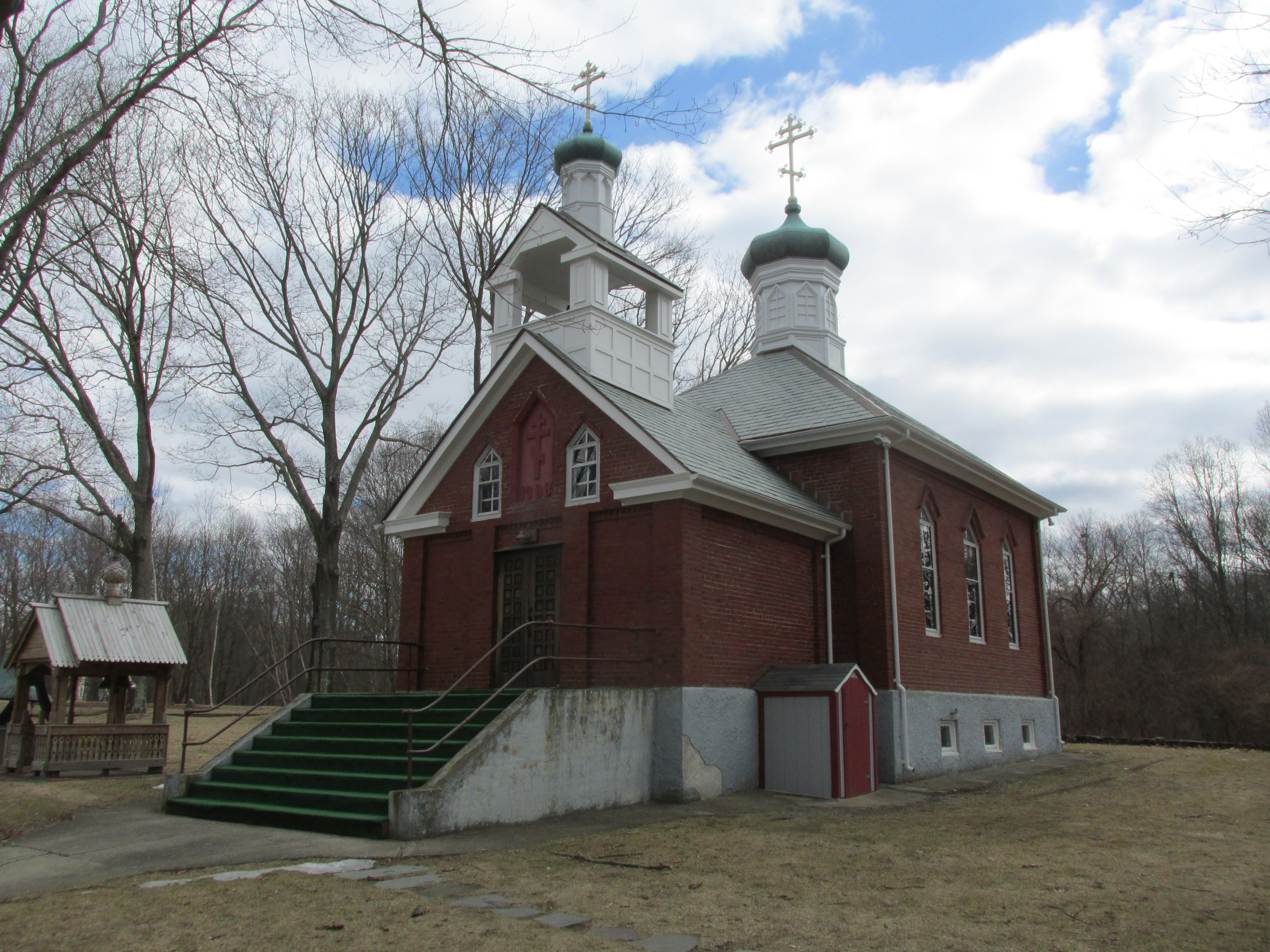
- Dormition of the Virgin Mary Parish

- Location in Providence County and the state of Rhode Island.
- Coordinates: 41°58′15″N 71°27′35″W
- Country: United States
- State: Rhode Island
- County: Providence

Area
  - Total: 3.38 sq mi (8.75 km^{2})
  - Land: 3.18 sq mi (8.24 km^{2})
  - Water: 0.20 sq mi (0.52 km^{2})
- Elevation: 217 ft (66 m)

Population (2020)
  - Total: 8,140
  - Density: 2,559/sq mi (988.1/km^{2})
- Time zone: UTC-5 (Eastern (EST))
  - Summer (DST): UTC-4 (EDT)
- FIPS code: 44-20260
- GNIS feature ID: 1218975

Cumberland Hill is a census-designated place (CDP) in the town of Cumberland, in Providence County, Rhode Island, United States. As of the 2020 census, Cumberland Hill had a population of 8,140.

== Geography ==
Cumberland Hill is located at 41°58′15″N 71°27′35″W (41.970798, -71.459718).

According to the United States Census Bureau, the CDP has a total area of 3.4 square miles (8.8 km^{2}), of which 3.2 square miles (8.3 km^{2}) is land and 0.19 square miles (0.5 km^{2}) (5.85%) is water.

== Demographics ==
Historical population
Census	Pop.	Note	%±
2020	8,140		—
U.S. Decennial Census

=== 2020 census ===
The 2020 United States census counted 8,140 people, 3,316 households, and 2,237 families in Cumberland Hill. The population density was 2,558.9 people per square mile (988.0 people/km^{2}). There were 3,393 housing units at an average density of 1,066.6 units per square mile (411.8 units/km^{2}). The racial makeup was 86.38% (7,031) white or European American (85.45% non-Hispanic white), 1.71% (139) black or African-American, 0.1% (8) Native American or Alaska Native, 5.34% (435) Asian, 0.01% (1) Pacific Islander or Native Hawaiian, 1.72% (140) from other races, and 4.74% (386) from two or more races. Hispanic or Latino of any race was 4.24% (345) of the population.

Of the 3,316 households, 30.7% had children under the age of 18; 53.5% were married couples living together; 25.7% had a female householder with no spouse or partner present. 27.5% of households consisted of individuals and 13.2% had someone living alone who was 65 years of age or older. The average household size was 2.7 and the average family size was 3.3. The percent of those with a bachelor's degree or higher was estimated to be 34.1% of the population.

20.6% of the population was under the age of 18, 7.4% from 18 to 24, 24.9% from 25 to 44, 29.9% from 45 to 64, and 17.2% who were 65 years of age or older. The median age was 42.6 years. For every 100 females, the population had 106.8 males. For every 100 females ages 18 and older, there were 111.7 males.

The 2016–2020 5-year American Community Survey estimates show that the median household income was $94,773 (with a margin of error of +/- $18,500) and the median family income was $110,654 (+/- $12,490). Males had a median income of $65,172 (+/- $10,675) versus $43,532 (+/- $4,974) for females. The median income for those above 16 years old was $55,053 (+/- $5,278). Approximately, 3.0% of families and 6.4% of the population were below the poverty line, including 10.1% of those under the age of 18 and 4.5% of those ages 65 or over.

=== 2000 census ===
As of the census of 2000, there were 7,738 people, 3,054 households, and 2,204 families residing in the CDP. The population density was 908.1 people/km^{2} (2,352 people/mi^{2}). There were 3,109 housing units at an average density of 364.9 units/km^{2} (945 units/mi^{2}). The racial makeup of the CDP was 96.89% White, 0.39% African American, 0.03% Native American, 1.28% Asian, 0.04% Pacific Islander, 0.53% from other races, and 0.85% from two or more races. Hispanic or Latino of any race were 1.25% of the population.

There were 3,054 households, out of which 33.7% had children under the age of 18 living with them, 60.8% were married couples living together, 8.5% had a female householder with no husband present, and 27.8% were non-families. 23.4% of all households were made up of individuals, and 10.7% had someone living alone who was 65 years of age or older. The average household size was 2.53 and the average family size was 3.01.

In the CDP, the population was spread out, with 24.6% under the age of 18, 5.0% from 18 to 24, 33.6% from 25 to 44, 21.7% from 45 to 64, and 15.0% who were 65 years of age or older. The median age was 38 years. For every 100 females, there were 93.3 males. For every 100 females age 18 and over, there were 89.5 males.

The median income for a household in the CDP was $57,697, and the median income for a family was $68,361. Males had a median income of $44,332 versus $31,650 for females. The per capita income for the CDP was $28,879. About 2.2% of families and 2.9% of the population were below the poverty line, including 1.1% of those under age 18 and 6.8% of those age 65 or over.
