= Valley Falls Mill =

- U.S. National Register of Historic Places
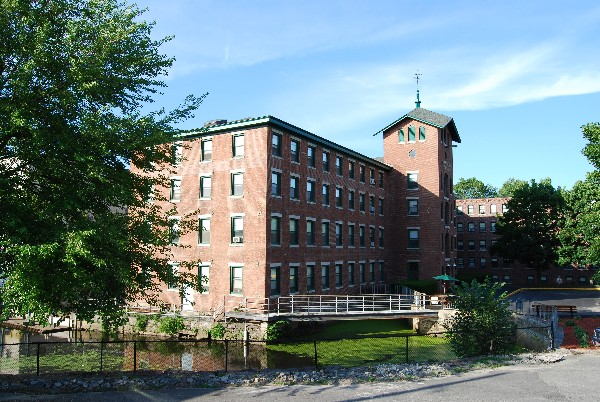

- Location within Rhode Island Location within the United States
- Location: 1359, 1361–63 Broad Street, Central Falls, Rhode Island
- Coordinates: 41°53′55″N 71°23′20″W
- Built: 1849; 177 years ago
- Architectural style: Italianate
- MPS: Central Falls MRA
- NRHP reference No.: 78000012 (original); 78000013 (increase)

Significant dates
- Added to NRHP: April 26, 1978
- Boundary increase: December 18, 1978

The Valley Falls Mill is a historic textile mill complex on Broad Street in Central Falls, Rhode Island. The complex consists of the primary mill building, a large Italianate brick four-story building erected in 1849, several outbuildings. a dam across the Blackstone River, and a portion of the original canal system which provided water power to the mill. The outbuildings include the gatehouse controlling waterflow into the canals, a small stuccoed office building now serving as a retail establishment, and a brick bathhouse built c. 1870 that stands just south of the mill race. The complex originally had a second mill building and power canal; that building was destroyed by fire, and its canal was filled in. The main mill building was developed as housing in the late 1970s, including a sympathetic replacement for the second mill building.

The complex was listed on the National Register of Historic Places in 1978.

== See also ==
- Valley Falls Company
- National Register of Historic Places listings in Providence County, Rhode Island
