= Cranston Public Library =

Public library system in Rhode Island, US

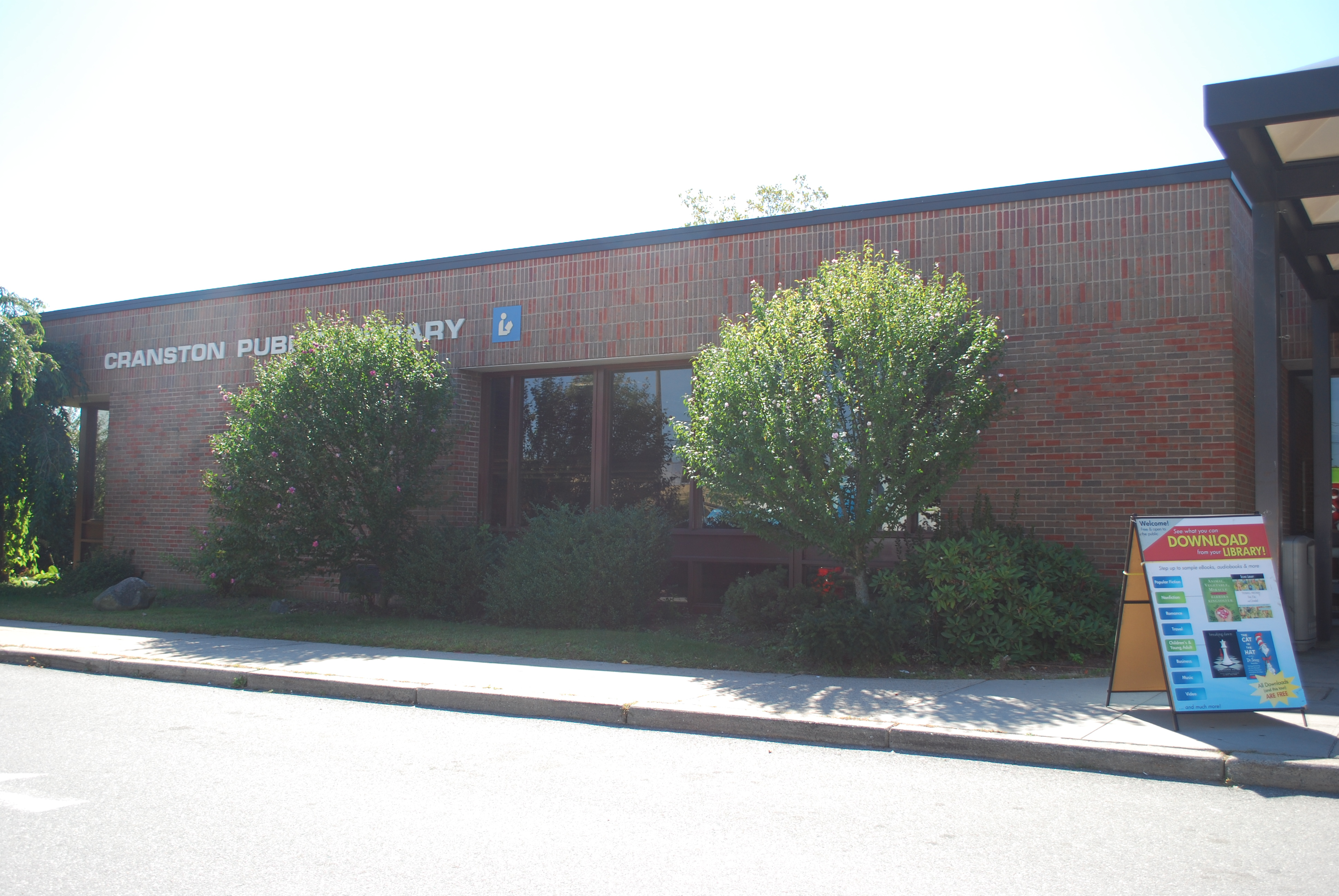
- The Cranston Public Library central branch in 2009
- 41.754378°N 71.456945°W
- Location: Cranston, Rhode Island
- Established: 1968 (system)
- Branches: 6

Collection
- Size: 337,681 (2016)

Access and use
- Circulation: 568,755 (2016)
- Population served: 81,034 (2016)
- Members: 38,057 (2016)

Other information
- Budget: $3,150,510 (2016)
- Director: Edward Garcia
- Employees: 103
- Website: www.cranstonlibrary.org

The Cranston Public Library is the public library system serving Cranston, the second largest city in Rhode Island. The first library in Cranston was formed in 1797, while the library system was formed in 1966 by the Cranston City Council. The present day library system formed in 1968 when six independent neighborhood libraries came together as one. There are six locations in the system, including a central library and five neighborhood branches. The library system is governed by a board of trustees consisting of seven members appointed by the Cranston City Council. Members serve staggered three-year terms. Meetings are open to the public.

In addition to traditional library services, the Cranston Public Library provides services such as tax preparation, 3D printing, analog-to-digital audio transferring, and educational programs among others. The system also provides mobile services to homebound residents.

== Locations ==
The public library system in Cranston began as multiple independent public libraries serving local neighborhoods. Today, the Cranston Public Library system still serves local communities through its central library and five neighborhood branches.

=== Cranston Central Library ===
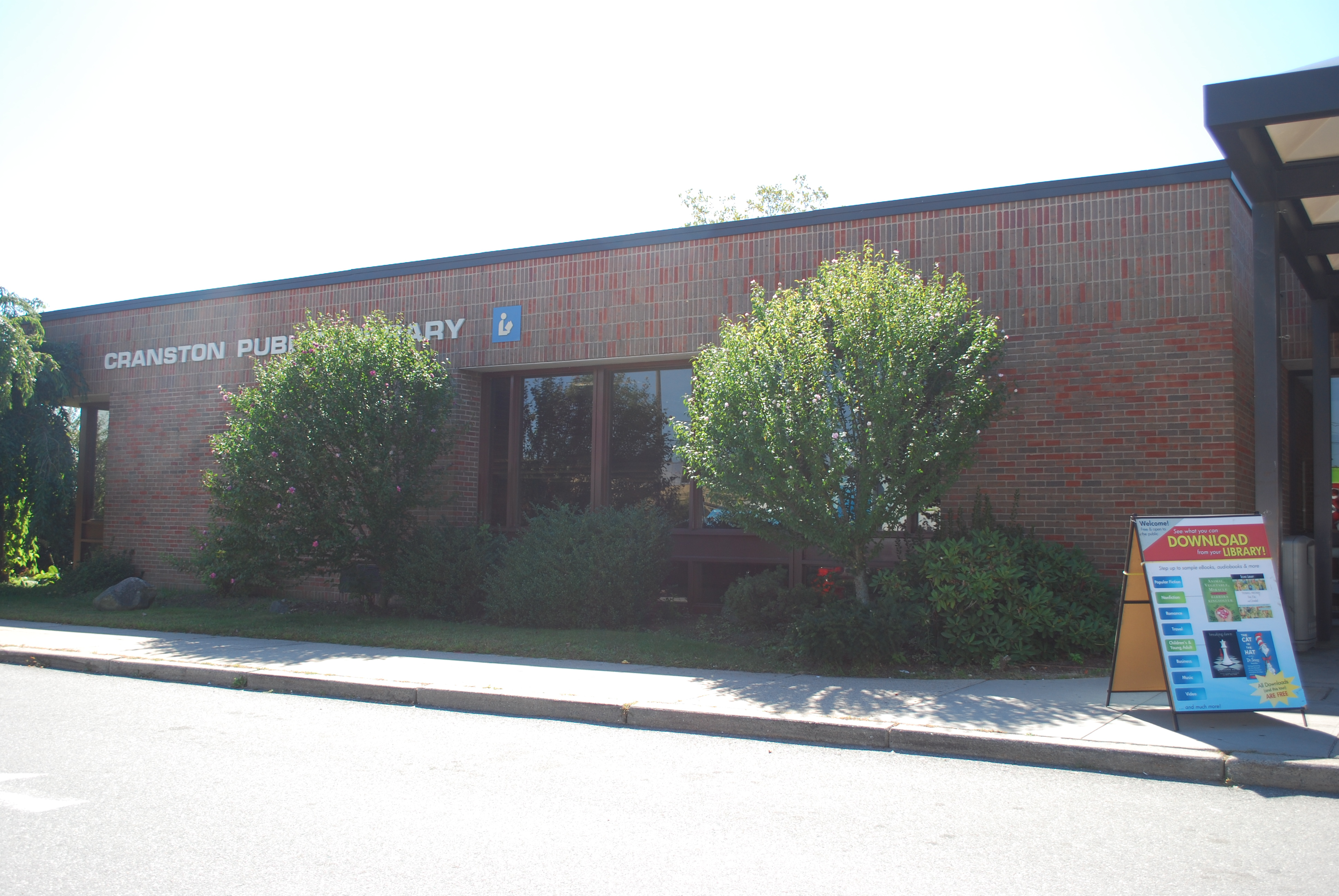
Cranston Central Public Library.

The Central Library of the Cranston Public Library system opened in April 1983. Since then, the Central Library has served as Cranston Public Library's reference and administrative center. The building originally boasted 22,500 square feet on three and a half acres of land, with a capacity for 110,000 volumes. The parking lot was expanded in 1992, and a 6,200 square foot addition was added in 1993/1994. The Central Library offers the community an inviting children's room, a teen space, public computers for all ages, and a range of programs and instructional technology classes.

=== Edward Costa Memorial Arlington Branch ===
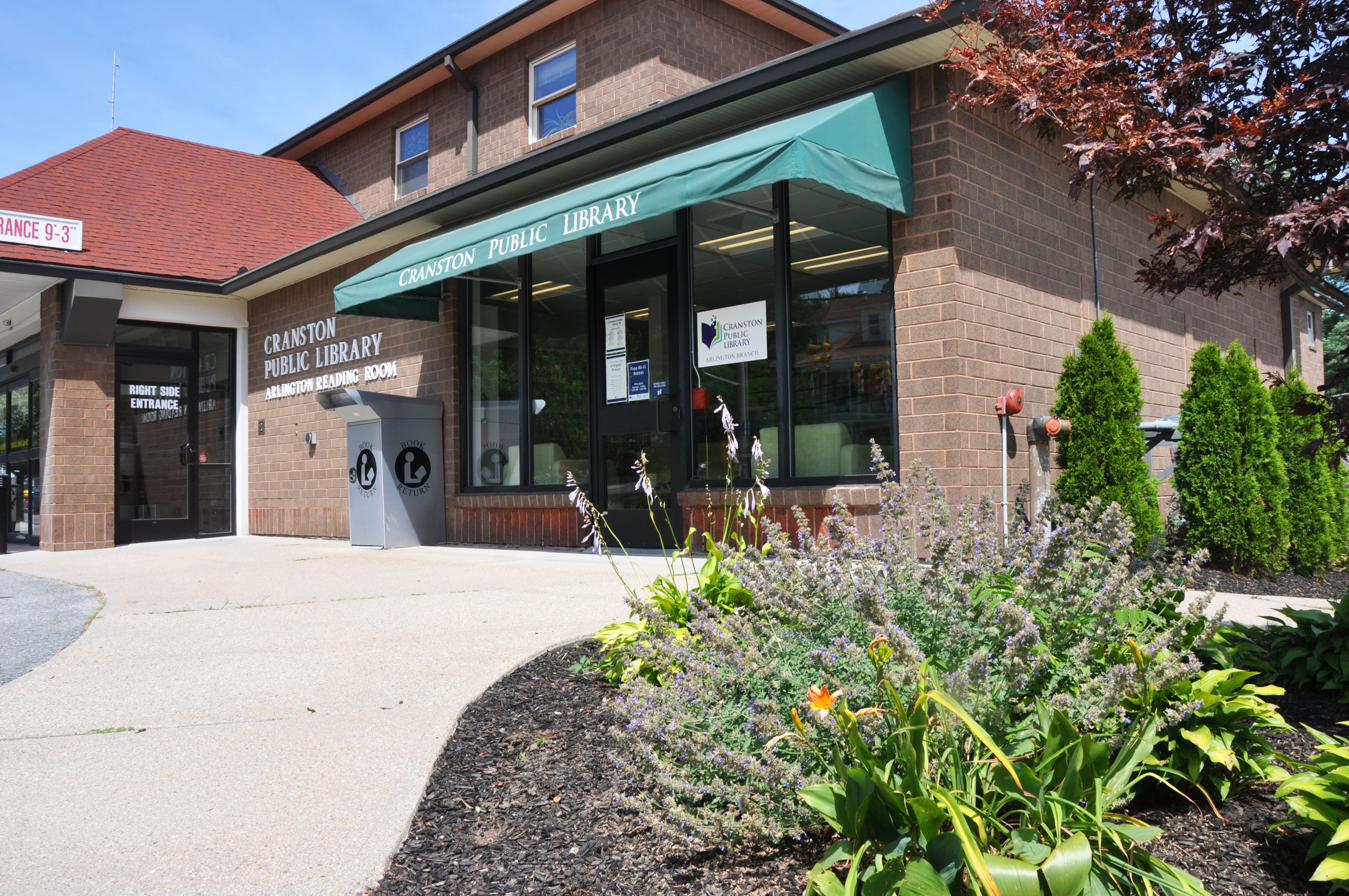
Arlington Branch

Located on the first floor of the Cranston Senior Center, the Edward Costa Memorial Arlington Branch, formerly named the Arlington Branch, the Arlington Library, and the Arlington Reading Room, is a popular stop for pedestrians in the Arlington neighborhood and those visiting the Senior Center.

This branch was initially founded by Henry O. Tripp and members of the Arlington Baptist Church. It was established in the neighborhood district hall in 1895 with a collection of 500 volumes. In 1907, the Arlington Library moved to a new building on Cranston Street. It also added a branch in the Cranston Print Works Brick Store, which lasted for 50 years until the building was demolished. In an agreement with the city of Cranston, the Arlington Library building on Cranston Street was turned over to the city and demolished to build a new Cranston Senior Center in 1987. The agreement called for the Arlington Reading Room to be inside the new center. In 2013, this Reading Room was renovated, with new collections and updated technology. It was reintroduced as the new Arlington Branch Library. In 2018, it was renamed the Edward Costa Memorial Arlington Branch, in honor of longtime trustee and library advocate Edward Costa.

=== Auburn Branch ===
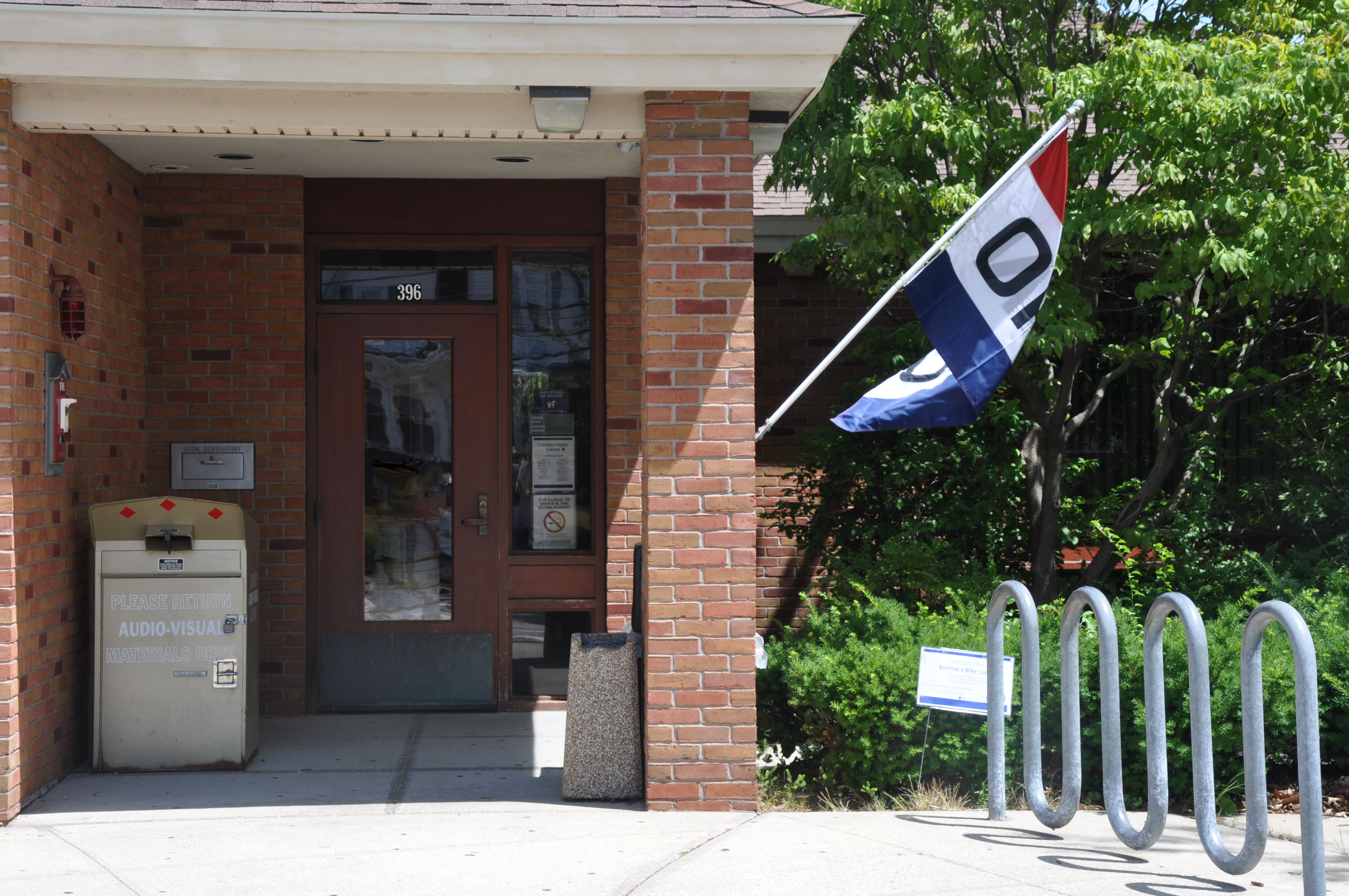
Auburn Branch

The Auburn Branch of the Cranston Public Library serves the Auburn neighborhood of Cranston. It was first established as the Auburn Reading Room in 1888. It opened in a little storefront on the northeast corner of Wellington Avenue. After moving to several temporary locations, the current Auburn Branch was built on Pontiac Avenue in 1991. At one point in time, the branch had a collection of Swedish materials for the Swedish immigrants who worked in the local mills.

The Auburn Branch currently operates Cranston Public Library's Books @ Home program, the library system's homebound delivery service. Books @ Home has been recognized as an innovative model program by the American Library Association in its "Keys to Engaging Older Adults @ your library" toolkit.

=== Knightsville Branch ===
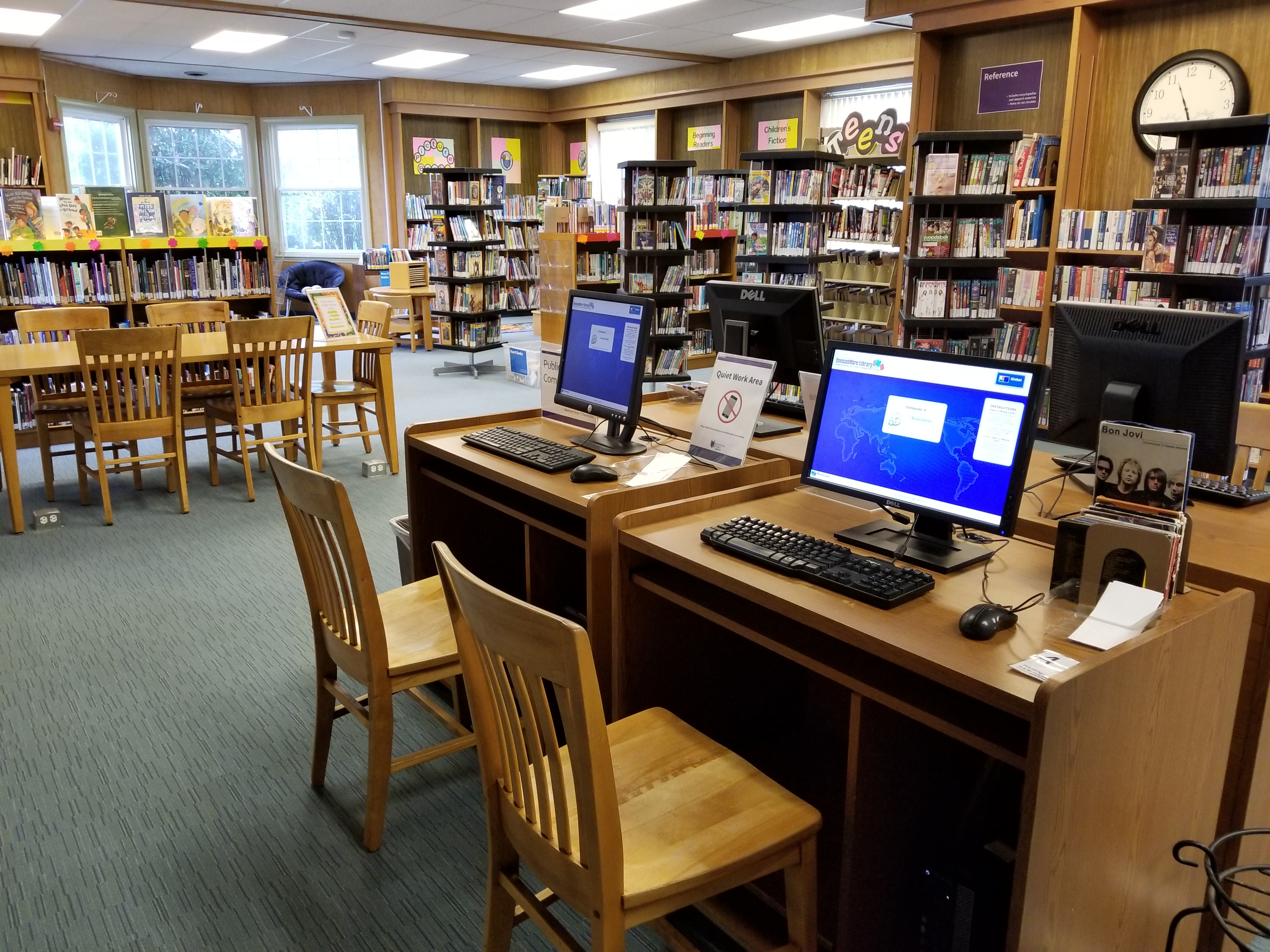
Knightsville Branch

The Knightsville Branch initially opened as the Knightsville Community Library in a storefront in 1926 in the Knightsville neighborhood of Cranston. The Honorable Jonathan F. Comstock and Richard Nixon, head of the local volunteer fire company, are credited with its establishment. The library moved to several locations along Cranston Street until a land donation, made in memory of Gerard Ruggieri, made the construction of the current location at 1847 Cranston Street possible.

=== Oak Lawn Branch ===
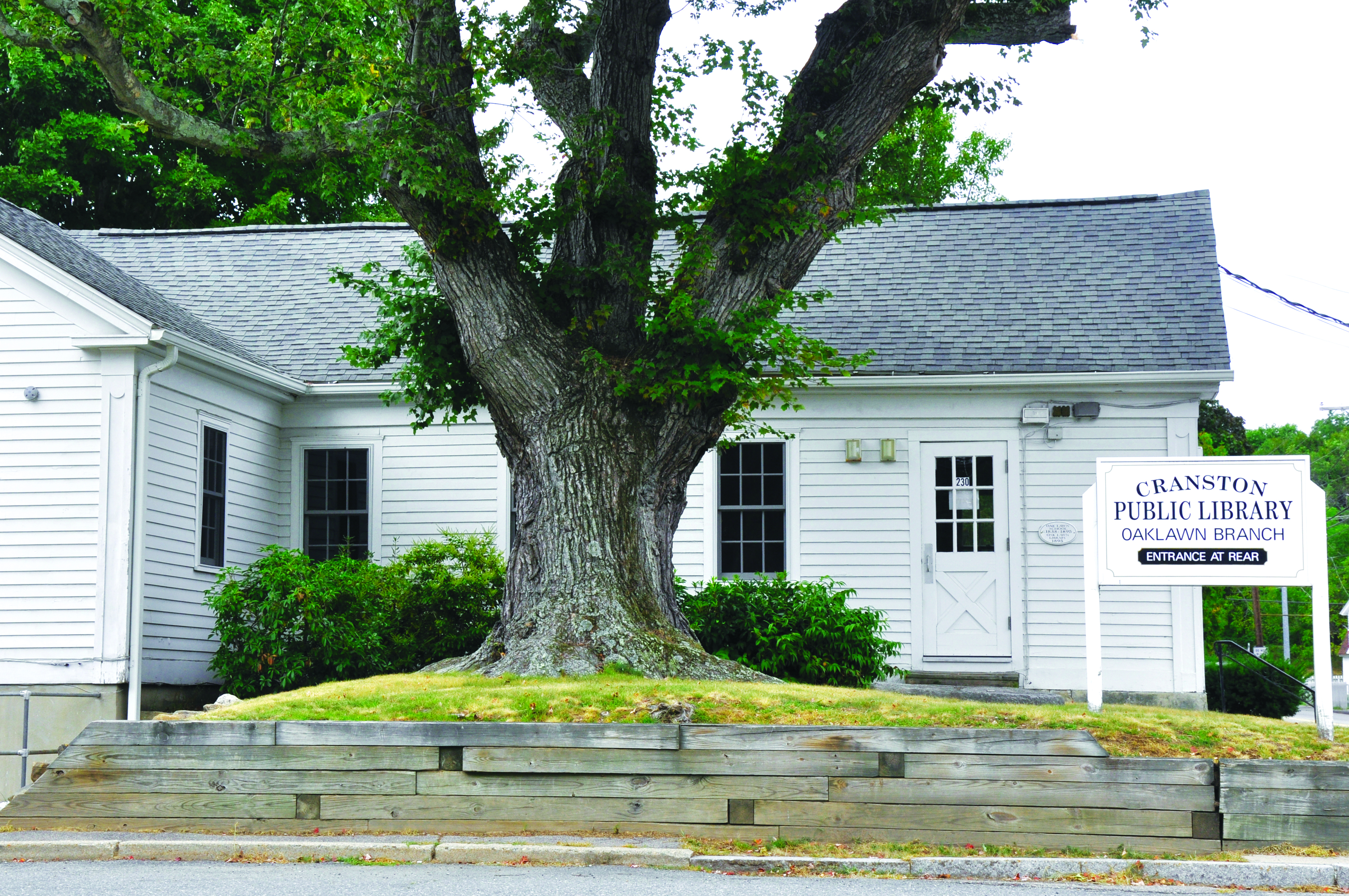
Oak Lawn Branch

The Oak Lawn Library began as a small collection of books housed in the old Quaker Meeting House, which was the social center of the community. The books were donated by members of the Oak Lawn Village neighborhood of Cranston, most notably Reverend William A. Briggs of the Oak Lawn Baptist Church, and were supplemented by government publications and materials purchased with funds raised by women in the village.

After struggling due to a lack of materials, funds, and a permanent home, Reverend Briggs acquired the school building on Wilbur Avenue, across the street from his church, and formed the Oak Lawn Free Public Library Association. The building had been built around 1830 and was moved to this site on Wilbur Avenue in 1840. It served as the village school until 1895. The collection, now 850 volumes, began to circulate in May 1896 with the continued support of families in the surrounding community, including many members of the Shaw family who served as librarians at the branch. The library is still at this location and is Cranston's oldest library building.

It underwent construction in 1965 to create space for a children's library, then again in 1990 for the addition of a new entrance and reading room.

=== William Hall Library ===
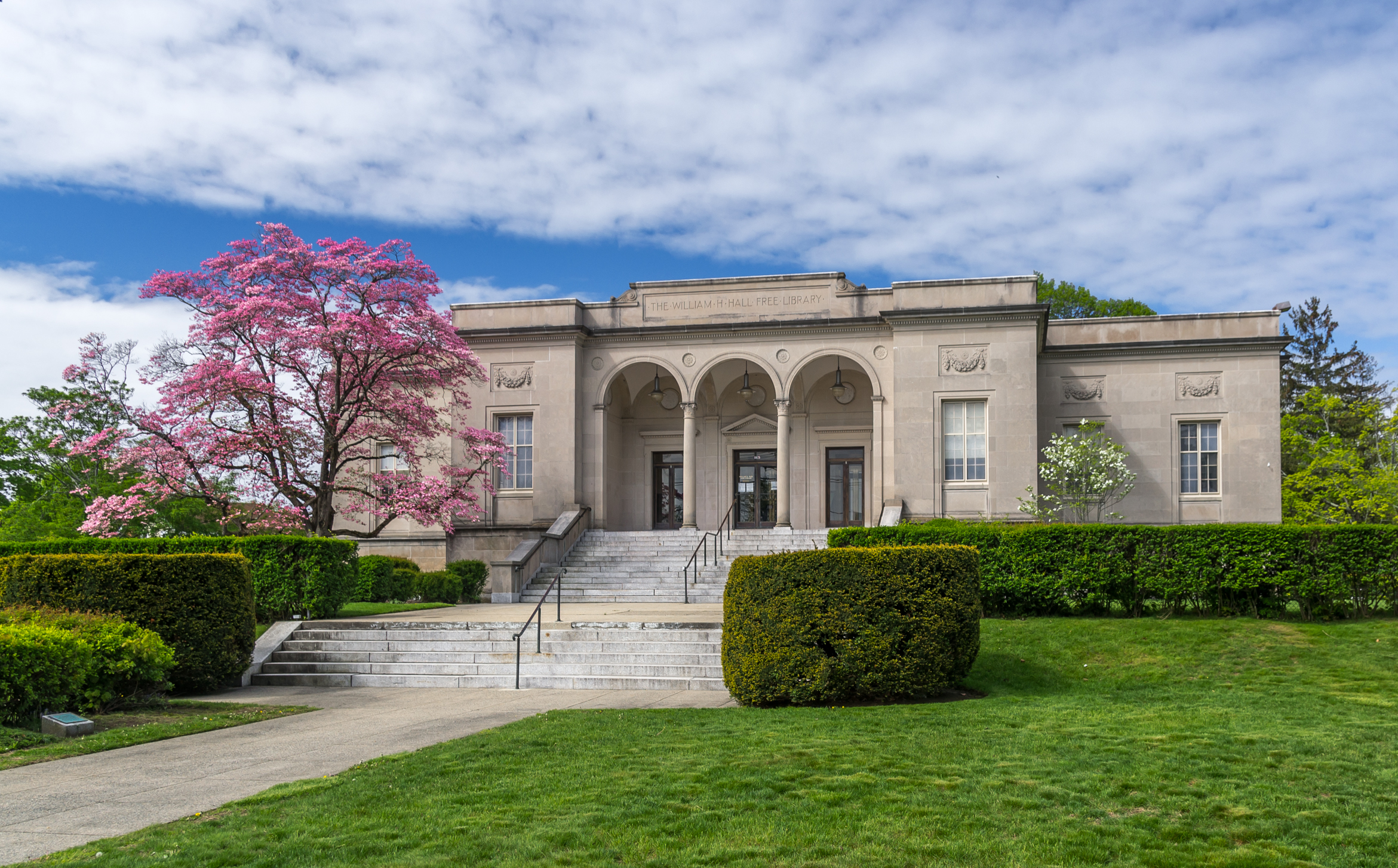
The William H Hall Free Library, in 2017.

The William Hall Library serves the neighborhood of Edgewood. The site was dedicated in 1895. It was incorporated in 1896 as the Edgewood Free Library and was renamed in 1921 after local businessman William H. Hall bequeathed part of his estate to its development.

The building was completed in 1927 and served as the administrative center for the newly unified Cranston Public Library system from 1966 to 1983. The library also served as a community center. At one point, the library had a branch in the Pawtuxet Volunteer Fire Company Hall on the corner of Sheldon and Commercial Streets.

== History ==
The Cranston Public Library system was formed in 1966, when six independent neighborhood libraries came together as one library system. The system currently has a central library and five neighborhood branches.

1700s

- In 1797, 37 men in the Western part of Cranston formed the Cranston Library Society. Records suggest that this society was still in operation as late as 1806.

1800s

- In 1824, twelve men were granted a petition by the General Assembly to establish “a library of useful books” in the Knightsville neighborhood of Cranston. The Knightsville Library Society met at the Inn of James Aldrich, and funds were raised to purchase a bookcase to house the 57 volumes in the collection.This library society operated until 1831.
- In 1840, the Harmony Freemason's Lodge 9 F. and A.M. in Pawtuxet Village organized the Pawtuxet Masonic Library Association for the lodge's members and their families.
- Around 1840, the village of Fiskeville and Jackson built a Reading Room on Main Street.
- The Auburn Public Library opened as the Auburn Public Library Association in 1888 in a little storefront on Wellington Avenue with a collection of between 500 and 1000 volumes.
- Arlington Library opened in 1895 in the Arlington neighborhood district hall with a collection of 500 volumes.
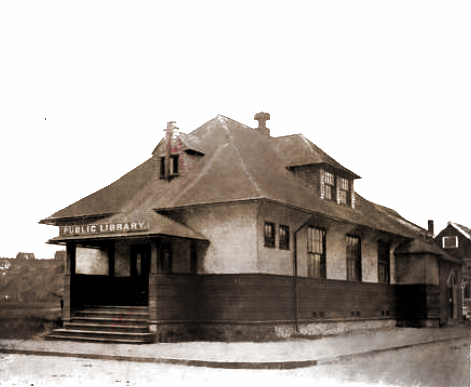
  Arlington Branch in 1901
- Oak Lawn Library opened in 1897 in a building that was formerly a schoolhouse.
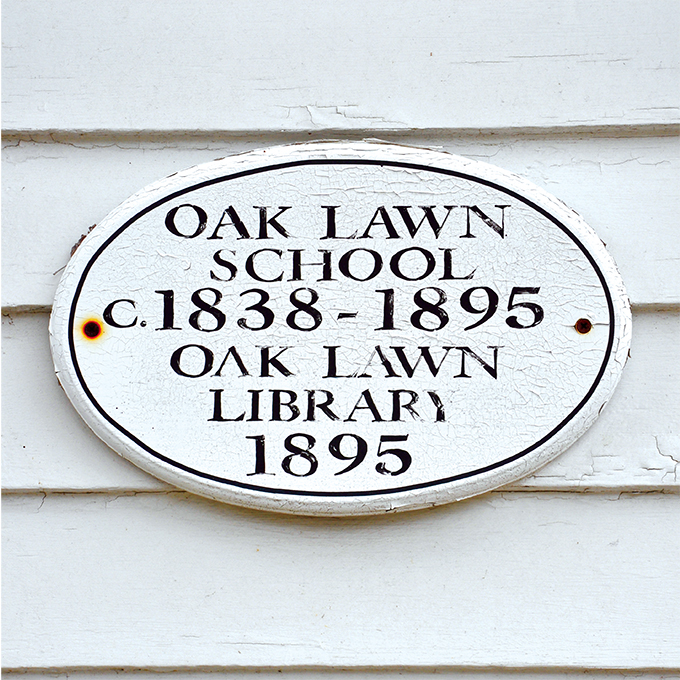
  Oak Lawn Historical Marker
- The Edgewood Public Library opened on March 13, 1897 with a collection of 800 volumes in a small school at Park and Warwick Avenues. On November 4, 1897, the library moved into a new building on Norwood Avenue near Broad Street.

1900s

- In 1907, the Arlington Library moved to the new Cranston Street building. Arlington also added a branch in the Cranston Print Works Brick Store, which lasted for 50 years until the building was demolished.

1920s

- A bookmobile made monthly visits to residents in Oaklawn Village and other villages in the Western part of Cranston in the 1920s.
- Knightsville Community Library opened in 1926 in a storefront on Cranston Street near the old town hall.
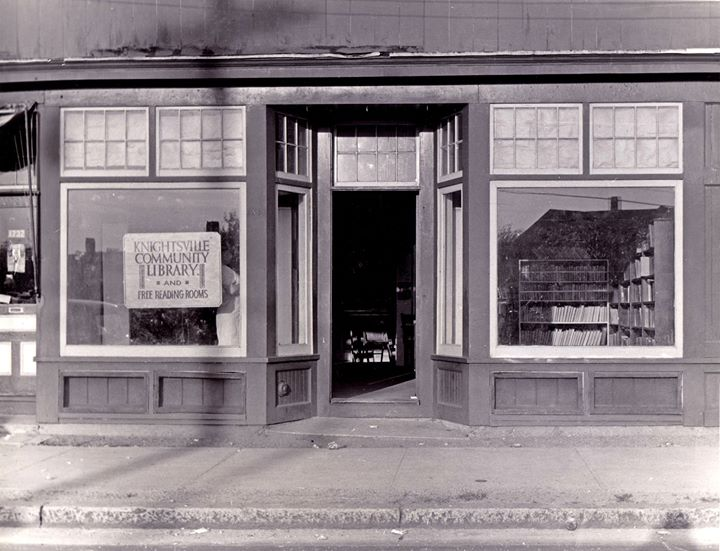
  Early Knightsville Branch
- The William H. Hall Free Library opened to the public November 13, 1927. The Hall Library replaced the Edgewood Public Library.
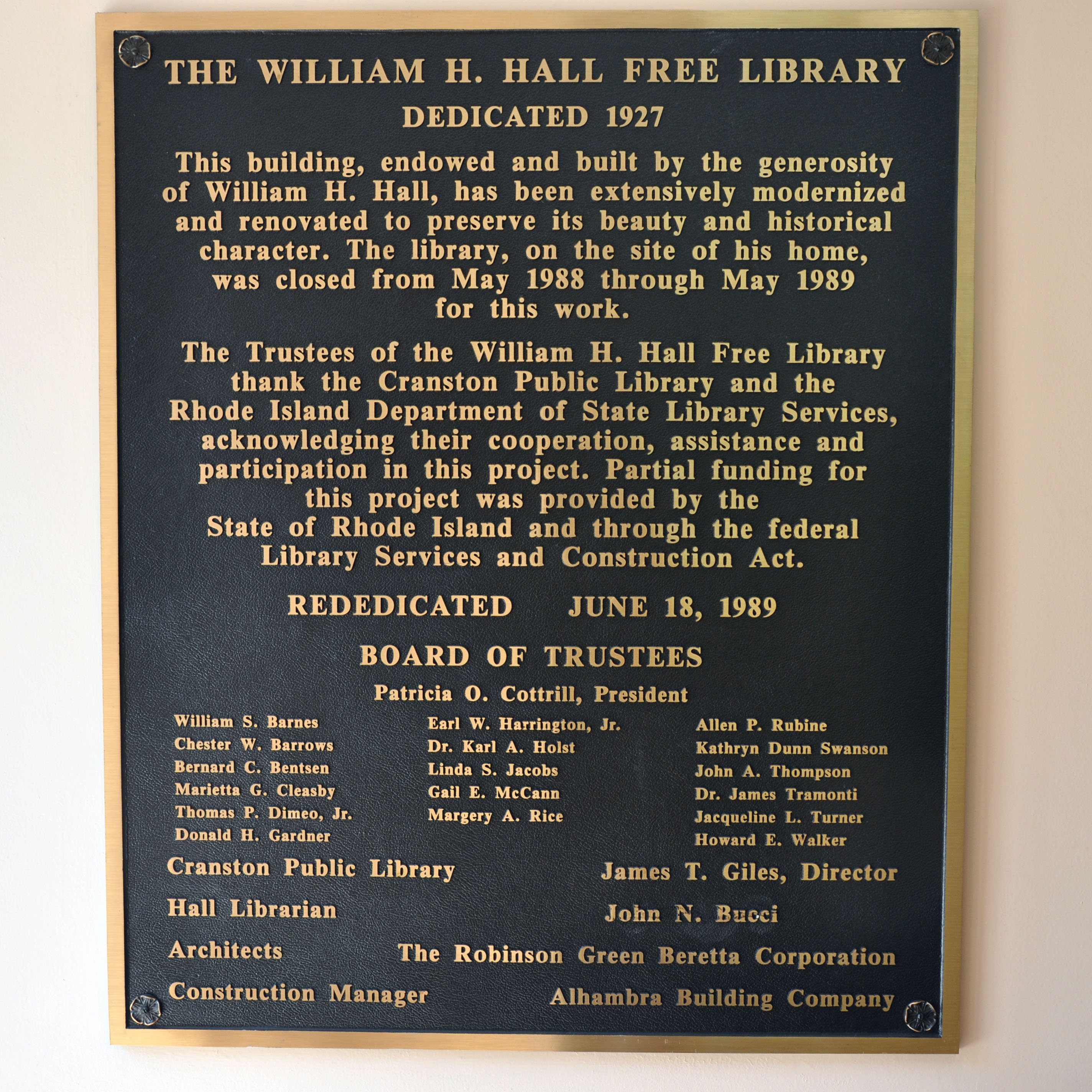
  William Hall Dedication Plaque

1930s

- In July 1932, residents of the Thornton neighborhood of Cranston formed the Thornton Community Free Public Library, which opened in a store front. The library would move several times over its history to different locations on Plainfield Pike.

1950s

- In 1952, the William Hall Library announced the opening of a branch on the second floor of the Pawtuxet Volunteer Fire Company Hall on the corner of Sheldon and Commercial Streets.

1960s

- The Cranston City Council commissioned a study by Kenneth Shaffer of Simmons College in 1965 to craft recommendations for library development in the city. Based on the Shaffer report and in accordance with Rhode Island law, the City Council established the Cranston Public Library system in 1966, and James Giles was appointed the first Library Director. The six neighborhood libraries were invited to join; Oak Lawn Library was the first to join in 1968.
- In 1962, Knightsville Library moved into its new location at 1847 Cranston Street on land donated by the estate of Gerard Ruggieri.
- An addition was put onto the Oak Lawn Library building in 1966 in celebration of its 77th anniversary.

1970s

- In 1972, CPL voted to create restricted library cards for minors which allowed parents to decide what kind of content their children could check out.
- The Thornton Library branch closed in 1977 due to budget cuts and low use of the branch. A new book van service was established to continue to serve residents of Thornton and other neighborhoods in western Cranston.

1980s

- Cranston's Central Library opened in 1983 on Sockanosset Cross Road and became the administrative center of the library system.
- In an agreement with the city of Cranston, the Arlington Library building on Cranston Street was turned over to the city and demolished to build a new Cranston Senior Center in 1987. The agreement called for the Arlington Reading Room to be inside the new center.
- The William Hall Library was renovated in 1989.

1990s

- The wave of library development in Cranston continued in the early 1990s: The Oak Lawn branch expanded and was renovated in 1990, a new Auburn branch building was constructed in 1991, and an addition to the Central Library was completed in 1993.
- James Giles retired in 1994 after 26 years as Library Director. David Macksam was appointed Library Director in 1995.

2000s

- In the 2000s, Cranston Public Library began offering free use of public computers and wireless Internet access.
- In 2006, a $900,000 bond initiative was passed to complete major infrastructure projects throughout the library system.

2010s

- In 2010, The Cranston Public Library received a Chinese collection from the Confucius Institute at the University of Rhode Island. The collection includes more than 1,100 historical, cultural, and artistic works in various media formats, in both English and Mandarin, and is valued at $30,000.
- In 2012, David Macksam retired as Library Director. Edward Garcia was appointed as Cranston Public Library's third Library Director.
- The Arlington Reading Room at the Cranston Senior Center was renovated, with new collections and updated technology, in 2013. It was reintroduced as the new Arlington Branch Library.
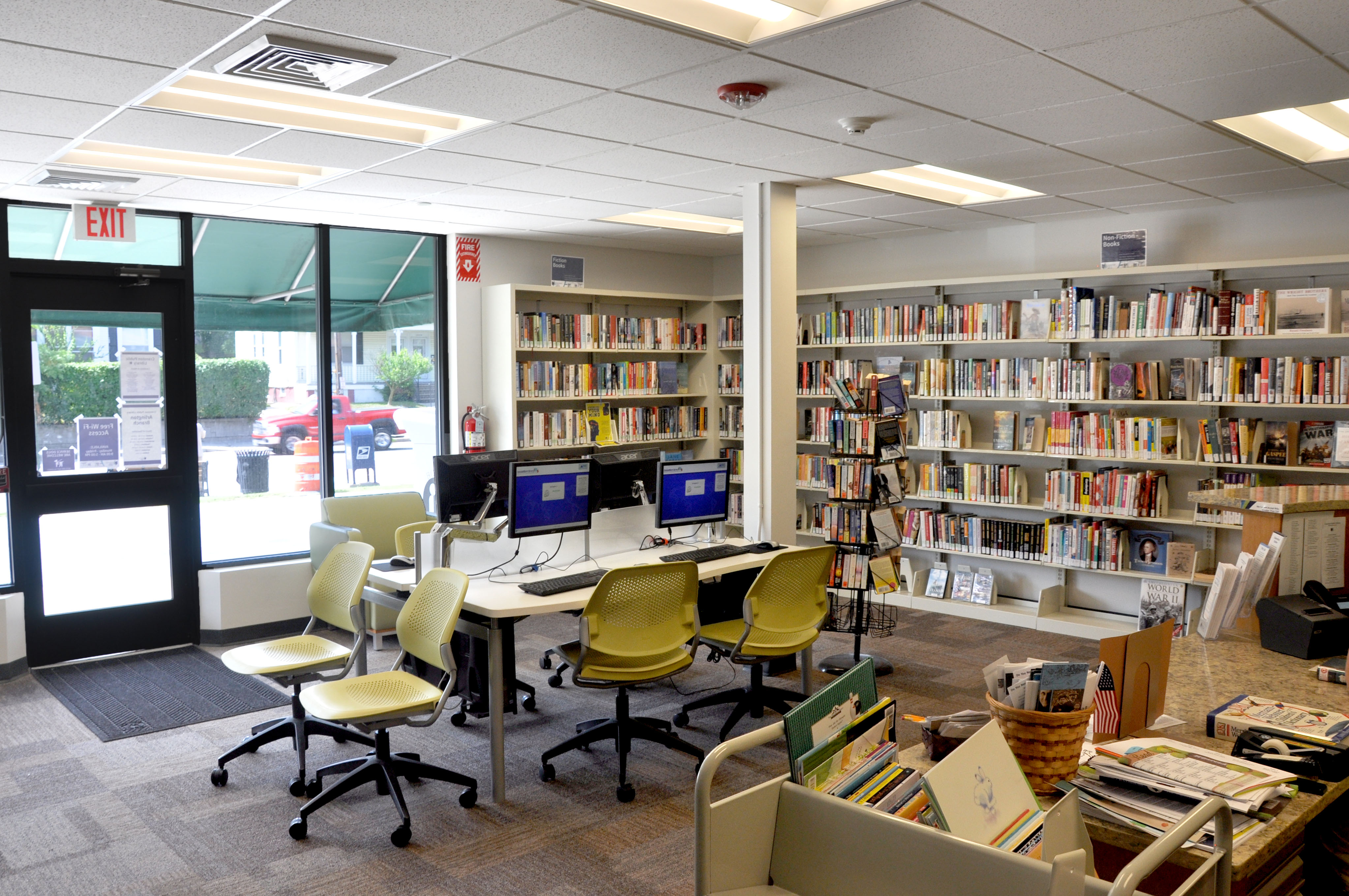
  Arlington Branch Interior
- In 2014, in response to Rhode Island's having the highest statewide unemployment rate in the nation, the Cranston Public Library, Providence Public Library, and adult education, assistive technology, digital literacy, and workforce development organizations received funding from the Institute of Museum and Library Services to develop Rhode Island Adult Lifelong Learning (ALL) Access. ALL Access is a computer training and workforce development program offered through the libraries to ensure access to education and workforce services for adults; develop and expand statewide resources for adult online learning and workforce development; create effective models to deliver and support education and workforce services for adults in the libraries; and build a data-driven case for libraries' role in providing adult education and workforce services.
- In 2015, the library received a collection of law books through a contribution from the Law Librarians of New England's “Outreach to Public Libraries” book drive.
- In 2015, Cranston Public Library was named Library of the Year by the University of Rhode Island's Graduate School of Library and Information Studies for its contributions to public library service.
- The Central Library renovated its reference department in 2015 and opened the “C-Lab," a multi-use digital media learning space, using funds from the Champlin Foundations.
- In 2016, Cranston Public Library was named the third-place recipient of the 2016 LibraryAware Community Award, given by Library Journal and underwritten by LibraryAware (a product of the NoveList division of EBSCO Information Services). The award was given in recognition of Cranston Public Library's efforts to bring library services to new immigrants moving into Cranston, RI. Cranston Public Library partnered with the Rhode Island Family Literacy Initiative (RIFLI) to offer free English-language and citizenship-preparation classes at the libraries.

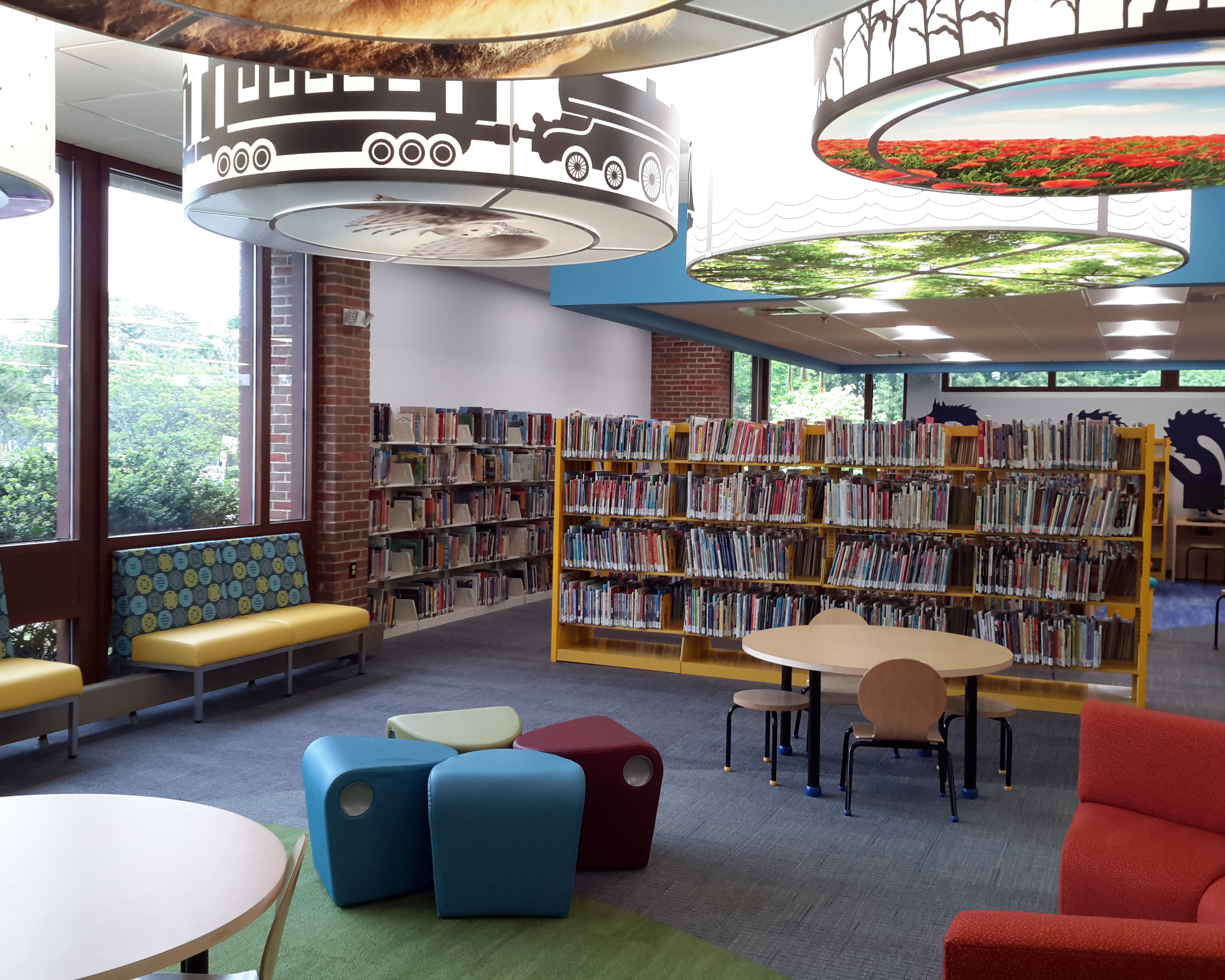
New Children's Room at the Central Library

- In 2017, Cranston's Central Public Library opened its remodeled Children's Room, which draws inspiration from classic stories like Alice's Adventures in Wonderland, The Chronicles of Narnia, Harry Potter, Where the Wild Things Are, and A Wrinkle in Time. This transformation was made possible by funds from the Champlin Foundations.
- In 2018, the Arlington Branch Library was renamed the Edward Costa Memorial Arlington Branch, in honor of longtime trustee and library advocate Edward Costa.
- In 2018, the Cranston Public Library System celebrated its 50th anniversary. The celebration began with a special ceremony to dedicate and rename the James T. Giles Community Room in honor of the first Library Director, James T. Giles.

== Collections ==
=== Physical collection ===
As of 2016, the Cranston Public Library's collection included 337,681 items, including 211,226 books, 33,400 periodicals, 16,527 CDs, and 19,897 movies. A special collection of books about autism were donated in 2011 by the Autism Project.

Cranston Public Library's online catalog allows members to browse and place holds on books, audiobooks, DVDs, CDs, and other materials. Through its membership in Ocean State Libraries (OSL), Rhode Island's statewide library consortium, members of Cranston Public Library have access to a diverse range of materials available at 70 other libraries across the state.

=== Digital collection ===
The library offers a variety of databases through Ocean State Libraries (OSL), Rhode Island's statewide library consortium. Patrons may access the databases at the library, from home, or on their mobile devices. Through Cranston Public Library's relationship with Ocean State Libraries, library members have access to downloadable ebooks, audiobooks, and streaming movies through OSL's eZone service

=== Local history collection ===
Local history collections across the system include town histories, maps, newspaper clippings, Cranston city phone directories, Cranston tax rolls, select Cranston High School yearbooks, and other resources. The library subscribes to the Rhode Island Historical Society magazine, Rhode Island History, and the Rhode Island Genealogical Society journal, RI Roots. The library also has extensive holdings of historical Cranston newspapers in print and on microfilm.

=== Cool tools ===
In 2017, Cranston Public Library introduced its Cool Tools collection, funded by a grant from the Taco/White Family Foundation. This collection comprises a stud finder, a thermal leak detector, a power meter, a Roku 2 streaming player, an infrared thermometer, and a ghost EMF meter.

== Services ==
=== Public programs ===
The Cranston Public Library hosts various programs, free and open to the public, every year. In 2015, Cranston Public Library offered 559 children's programs, 106 teen programs, 606 adult programs, and 181 family programs. Programs the library has held include a ghost tour of the Oak Lawn Branch, a screening of Chasing the Dragon: The Life of an Opioid Addict with a panel discussion on heroin and prescription drug abuse, citizenship programs, monthly craft and DIY programs for adults, free tax preparation, storytimes, book clubs for adults and children, summer reading programs for children and adults, a celebration of Rhode Island Library Day, a stop motion animation program, hands-on science programs for youth, a stuffed animal sleepover, and a mini Comic Con.

=== Meeting rooms ===
Meeting rooms at the various library branches are available to civic, cultural, and educational organizations during library hours. In 2016, community organizations held 425 programs in the Cranston Central Public Library meeting room. In 2018, in celebration of the 50th anniversary of the formation of the Cranston Public Library system, the meeting room at the Central Library was dedicated and renamed the James T. Giles Community Room in honor of the first Library Director, James T. Giles.

=== Museum passes ===
The Cranston Public Library system offers a museum membership program that allows library patrons discounted or free admission to several museums and cultural societies.

=== Educator services ===
Cranston Public Library offers a variety of services to local educators, including class visits for research help or introducing students to new technology, guest readers, access to online homework help, and resources for lessons or school projects. In 2016, Cranston Public Library partnered with the Cranston Public School Department to purchase Tutor.com for use by library cardholders. Tutor.com connects students to professional tutors for live, one-on-one tutoring and homework help. Children in school were able to sign up and resolve their fines and other issues using the "Fresh Start" program in 2017.

=== Homebound services ===
Cranston Public Library offers free homebound services for Cranston residents who are permanently homebound or temporarily unable to drive because of illness or injury. The Books @ Home Homebound Delivery Program delivered 4,657 Items in 2016. Books @ Home has been recognized as an innovative model program by the American Library Association in its "Keys to Engaging Older Adults @ your library" toolkit.

=== Technology access ===
All Cranston library locations offer free wifi and public computers with supported software applications for accessing the Internet, creating documents, printing, and offer scanning (up to 10 scans) and notary services at no charge. A variety of business services are available for a fee, including printing services (from the library's computers or the user's mobile device), fax services, and photocopying, as well as selling flash drives and earbuds.

==== C-Lab ====
The C-Lab offers structured classes, programs, one-on-one technology assistance (by appointment), and open hours where the public can drop in to learn, explore, and experiment with technology. Services and equipment available include a Makerbot Replicator 2X and Cube 2 3D printers; an Audio-Technica Stereo Turntable for vinyl to MP3 conversion; Roxio conversion software for VHS to DVD conversion; a Canon Selphy Photo Printer; a Canon VIXIA HFM500 HD Camcorder for film-making; and Dell laptops (Windows 7/8/10) for basic technology and computer assistance.

== Recognition and awards ==
Cranston Public Library has received regional and national coverage and recognition. The library's home delivery program, Books @ Home, has been recognized as an innovative model program by the American Library Association in its "Keys to Engaging Older Adults @ your library" toolkit. In 2014, in response to Rhode Island's having the highest statewide unemployment rate in the nation, the Cranston Public Library, Providence Public Library, and other organizations developed Rhode Island Adult Lifelong Learning (ALL) Access, a computer training and workforce development program offered through the libraries’ learning lounges, dedicated drop-in computer spaces staffed by an adult educator and volunteers. In the Spring of 2015, Cranston Public Library was named Library of the Year by the University of Rhode Island's Graduate School of Library and Information Studies for its contributions to public library service. In June 2015, Cranston Public Library was acknowledged by the Holocaust Education and Resource Center of Rhode Island (HERCRI) with a Mitzvah (or “Good Deeds”) Award in recognition of an ongoing collaboration between the two organizations. Cranston Public Library was also named a recipient of the 2016 LibraryAware Community Award for its efforts to bring library services to new immigrants moving into Cranston.

== Partnerships ==
The Cranston Public Public Library actively seeks to collaborate with community partners to better serve Cranston residents. Cranston Public Library is a member of Ocean State Libraries, the Greater Cranston Chamber of Commerce, the Rhode Island Genealogical Society, and the Rhode Island Family Literacy Initiative (RIFLI).

In 2016, the library partnered with the Cranston Senior Enrichment Center, local public and private schools, the RI Secretary of State, the Artists’ Exchange, the Cranston Herald, the RIFLI, the Cranston Police Department, the Cranston Substance Abuse Task Force, AARP, GameStop, Barnes & Noble, and Rhode Island Comic Con.

More recently, in 2017, the Cranston Public Library partnered with the Cranston Herald, the Cranston School Department, the Cranston Senior Center, and the Cranston Historical Society to create the Cranston Discovery Network, a series of 12 markers around the city to celebrate significant events, locations, and people in Cranston's history. The library has also partnered with the school district to share resources.

== See also ==
- List of libraries in Rhode Island
