= Knightsville =

The following places are named Knightsville:

- Knightsville, Indiana, United States
- Knightsville, Rhode Island, United States
- Knightsville, Utah, a ghost town in the United States
- Knightsville, Jamaica
