= Knightsville Meetinghouse =

Historic church in Rhode Island, United States

- U.S. National Register of Historic Places
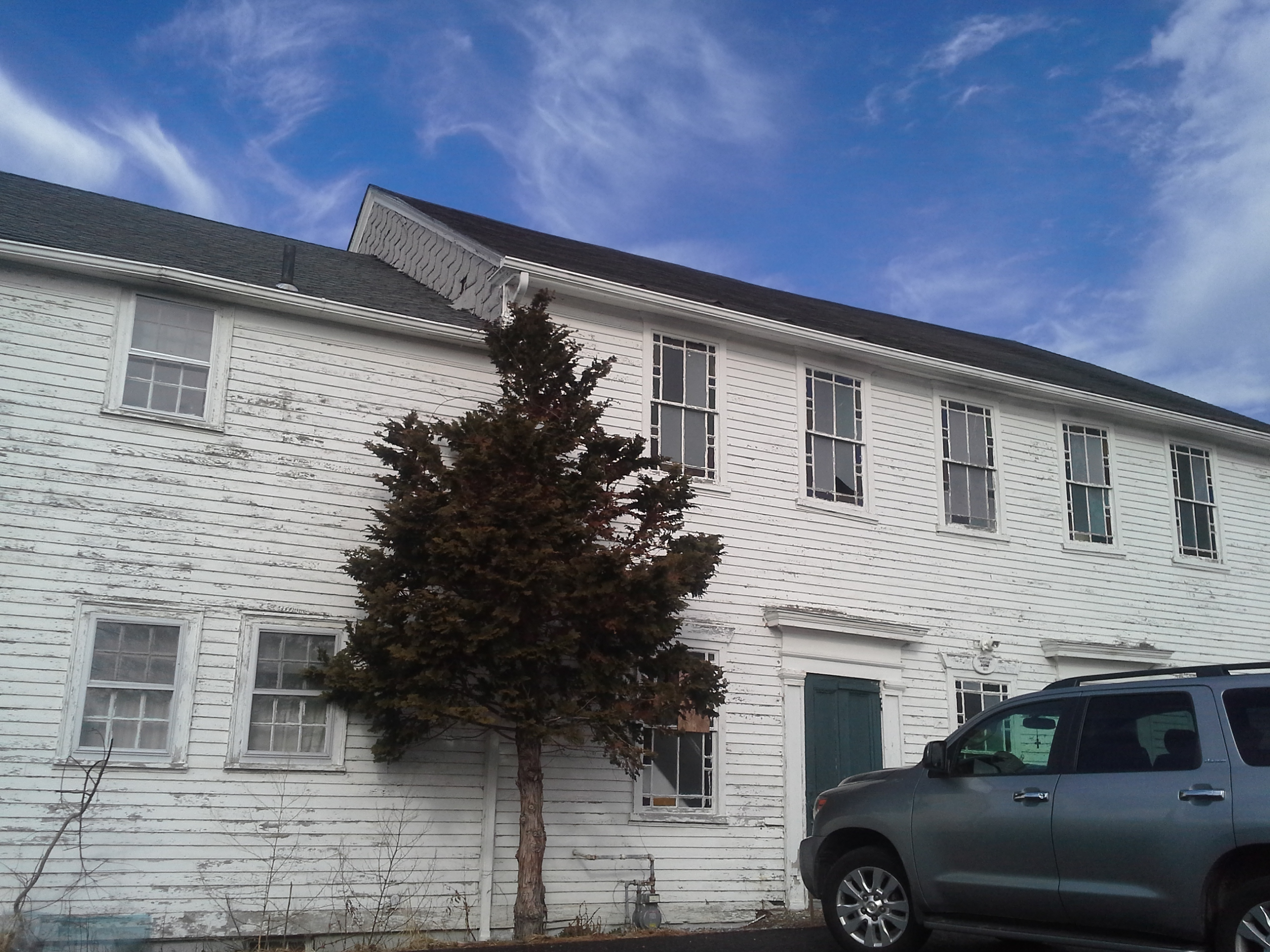

- Location within Rhode Island Location within the United States
- Location: Cranston, Rhode Island
- Coordinates: 41°46′54″N 71°28′8″W
- Built: 1807
- NRHP reference No.: 78000074
- Added to NRHP: March 8, 1978

The Knightsville Meetinghouse (also known as Knightsville-Franklin Congregational Church) was a historic church and meeting hall building at 67 Phenix Avenue within the village of Knightsville in Cranston, Rhode Island.

The meetinghouse was built in 1807 for the Benevolent Baptist Society. Town meetings were held in the building in the nineteenth century. Various Christian denominations also met in the building until 1864 when the Knightsville Mission Sabbath School, a large Sunday school began meeting in the building and desired to begin a formal church. A church was officially organized in the building in 1878 as a branch of the Union Congregational Church of Providence. The Providence and Knightsville churches remained affiliated until 1928 when the Knightsville branch broke off after Union merged with Plymouth. In 1967 Knightsville merged with the smaller Franklin Congregational Church. The Kinghtsville Meeting House was added to the National Register of Historic Places in 1978. The congregation was affiliated with the United Church of Christ, but in 2006 the handful of remaining members voted to leave the United Church of Christ and join the National Association of Congregational Christian Churches. After several decades declining funding and dwindling membership, the church closed in October 2009 and was subsequently demolished in 2015.

== See also ==
- National Register of Historic Places listings in Providence County, Rhode Island
