= Riverzedge =

Non-profit arts organization, providing arts education underserved youth

- Formation: 2002; 24 years ago
- Founded at: Woonsocket, Rhode Island
- Type: Non-profit
- Purpose: Arts and public service
- Location: Woonsocket, Rhode Island
- Website: riverzedgearts.org

Riverzedge is a non-profit arts organization centered on providing arts education and programming for underserved youth in the Woonsocket area.

Riverzedge was founded in 2002. In 2014, the organization moved into its Second Avenue Studio Complex, in the building of a closed elementary school, and purchased that building, from the city of Woonsocket for $10 in 2017. In 2018, Riverzedge received three grants to renovate their Second Avenue Studio Complex: $249,000 from the Rhode Island State Council on the Arts, Champlin Foundation, and the June Rockwell Levy Foundation.

Riverzedge offers arts programs throughout the year, including an Arts and Entrepreneurship for teens, the Woonsocket Parent Leadership Training Institute, and a mobile studio that visits Woonsocket schools.

Riverzedge has become a model for after school arts programs. In 2009, the Afterschool Alliance analyzed Riverzedge statistics, noting that 100% or Riverzedge students graduated in Woonsocket, a city with a 35% graduation rate. After In 2013, Riverzedge was featured as a case study for after school arts programs in The Wallace Foundation's publication, "Something to Say: Success Principles for Afterschool Arts Programs From Urban You and Other Experts."

== Awards ==
- 2009 Afterschool Innovator Award, Afterschool Alliance and the Metlife Foundation
- 2010 National Arts and Humanities Youth Program
