= Saint Paul School =

Coordinates: 41°46′36.21″N 71°24′0.57″W

St. Paul School, Cranston

Location
- 1789 Broad Street; Cranston, Rhode Island, 02905; United States

Information
- Motto: "In Service to God since 1922."
- Established: September 1922
- Principal: Cindy Richard
- Faculty: 13 full-time
- Enrollment: 155, co-educational
- Colors: Navy and yellow
- Athletics: Basketball, volleyball, and cross country
- Mascot: N/A
- Affiliation: Roman Catholic
- Website: Official website

Saint Paul School is a Catholic, co-educational, elementary school in Cranston, Rhode Island, United States. It serves students from the cities of Cranston, Warwick and Providence in Rhode Island, USA.

Originally staffed by the Sisters of the Immaculate Heart of Mary, it is now led by a community of lay teachers, staff, parents, alumni, and parishioners of Saint Paul Church. The school is guided by the teachings of the Roman Catholic Church and the Diocese of Providence, Rhode Island.

In 2006, the school renamed its renovated auditorium for Jean Patterson, the principal of St. Paul School from 1994 to 2005. Under Patterson's leadership, enrollment increased, curricula were updated, sports teams were established, and major renovations to the school were completed.

== Information ==
Saint Paul School, under the direction of Principal Cindy Richard and St. Paul Church Pastor Father Thomas Woodhouse, serves students in grades pre-kindergarten through 8. The school has athletic teams, a computer lab and an after-school program. The oldest Catholic school in Cranston, it opened its doors in 1922.
