= Meshanticut, Rhode Island =

Neighborhood in Rhode Island, United States

Coordinates: 41°46′00″N 71°28′08″W

Meshanticut is a neighborhood in Cranston, Rhode Island, United States.

Meshanticut is a residential neighborhood on the western side of Cranston. Meshanticut, which is a Narragansett Indian word meaning "place of woods" features an eclectic array of housing styles including Victorian homes, cottages, and capes. The focal point of the neighborhood is Meshanticut State Park which surrounds Meshanticut Lake, a small lake popular for fishing in the summer and ice skating in winter. A road that encircles the lake is popular for walking and jogging.

It was gifted to the Metropolitan Parks Commission of Cranston by John Dean in 1910. It has previously been a parcel of the Dean estates since the 1870s, when the Dean family owned this section of Cranston west of Garden City.

Located in this area is Cranston High School West (CHSW), which also includes the Cranston Area Career and Technical Center (CACTC).
