= Edgewood (Cranston) =

Neighborhood in Cranston, Rhode Island, United States

Coordinates: 41°46′52″N 71°23′49″W

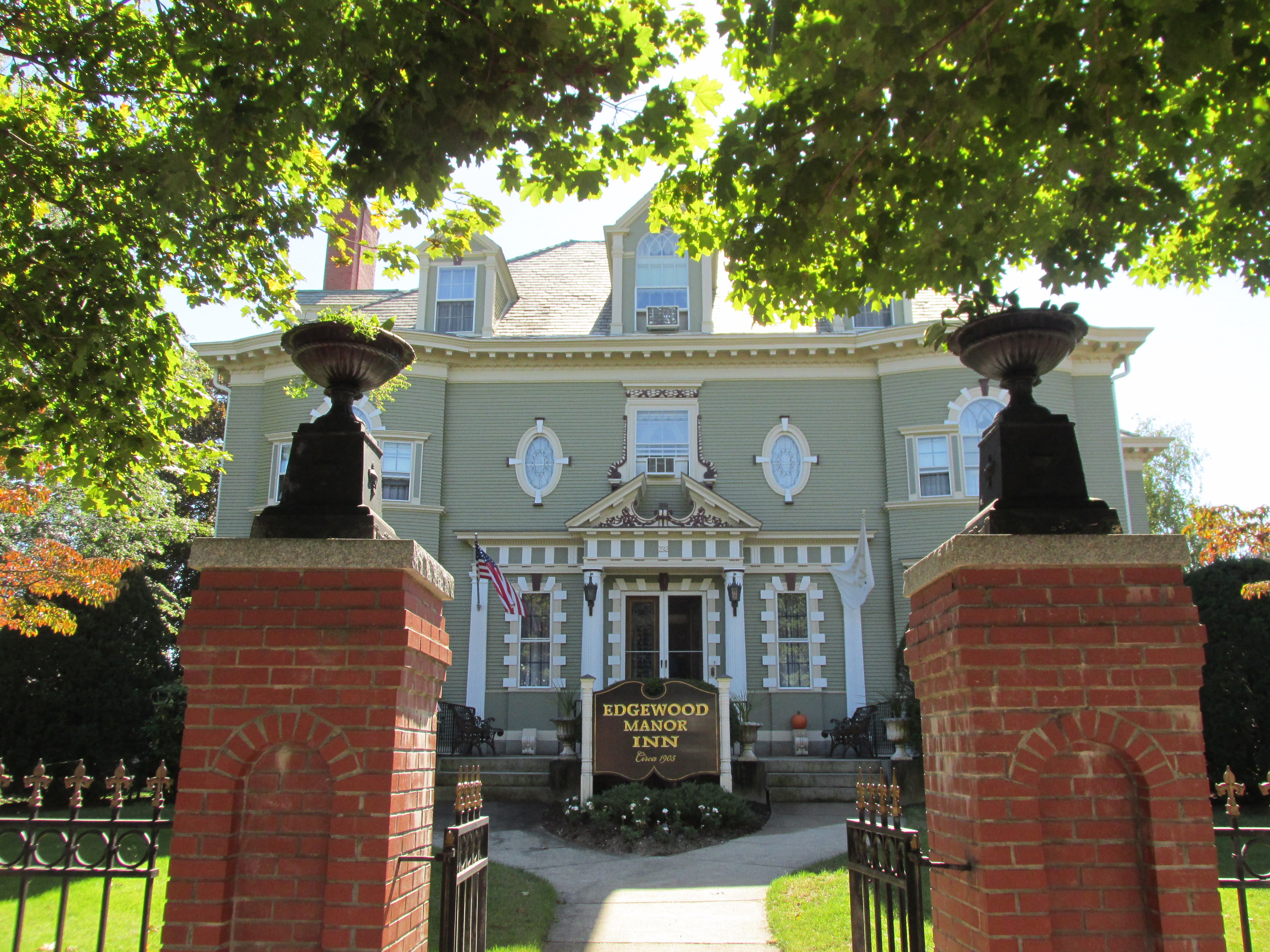
Edgewood Manor Inn

Edgewood is located in eastern Cranston, Rhode Island. It is three miles away from Providence.

Edgewood is a suburban neighborhood bordering Providence's Washington Park. The area of Edgewood has several National Historic districts. One of the grandest is the Norwood Avenue Historic District . The neighborhood features broad, tree-lined streets. The area is known for its many large and beautiful Victorian homes. Edgewood is also home to Nationally recognized inns, Edgewood Manor Inn (The Samuel Priest House c 1905) and the Charles Newhall House Inn (c 1892). Edgewood Yacht Club, Rhode Island Yacht Club, Port Edgewood, and the Pawtuxet Cove Marinas are all within the borders of Edgewood, Rhode Island.
