= Cranston, Rhode Island =

City in Rhode Island, United States

- City
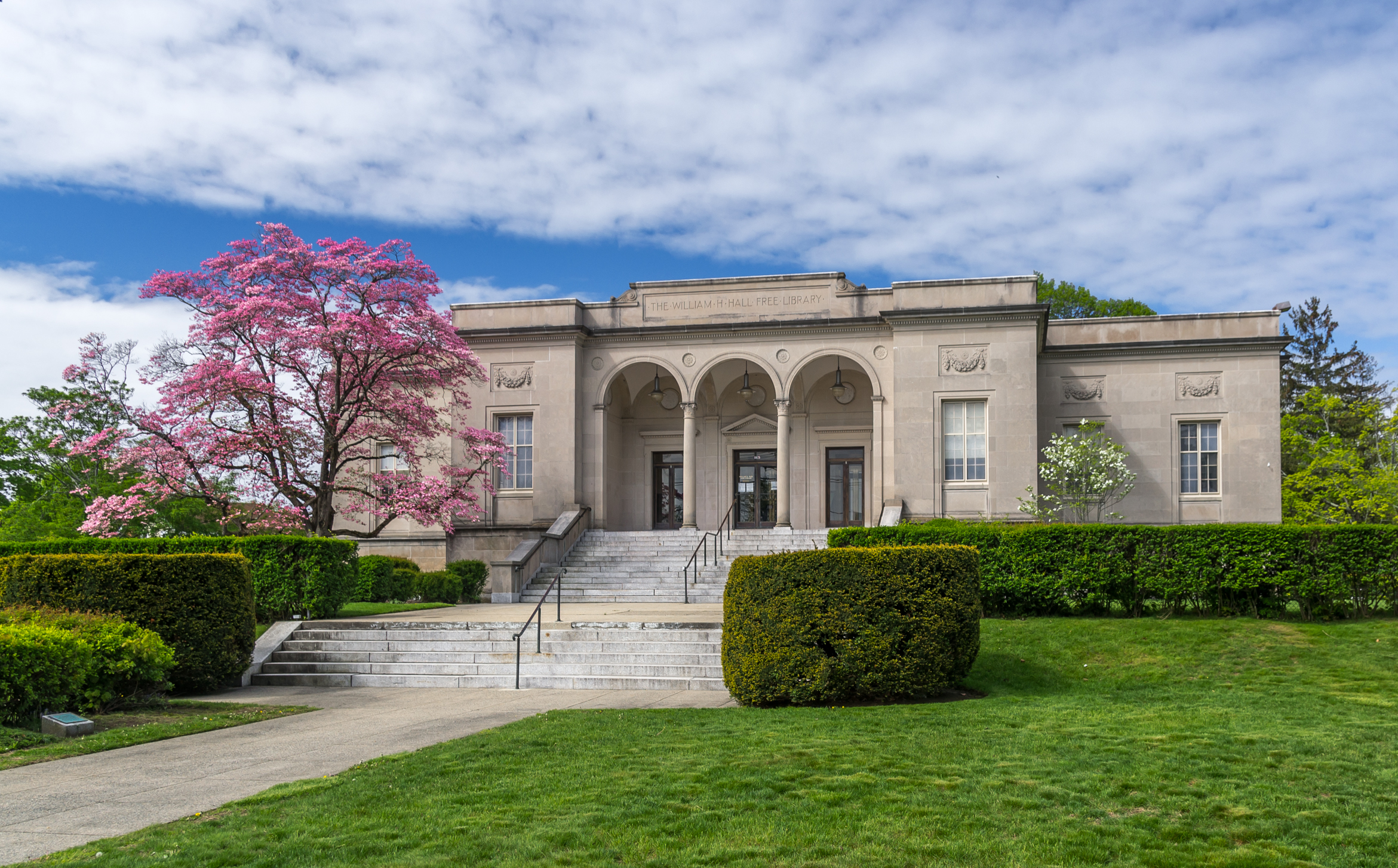
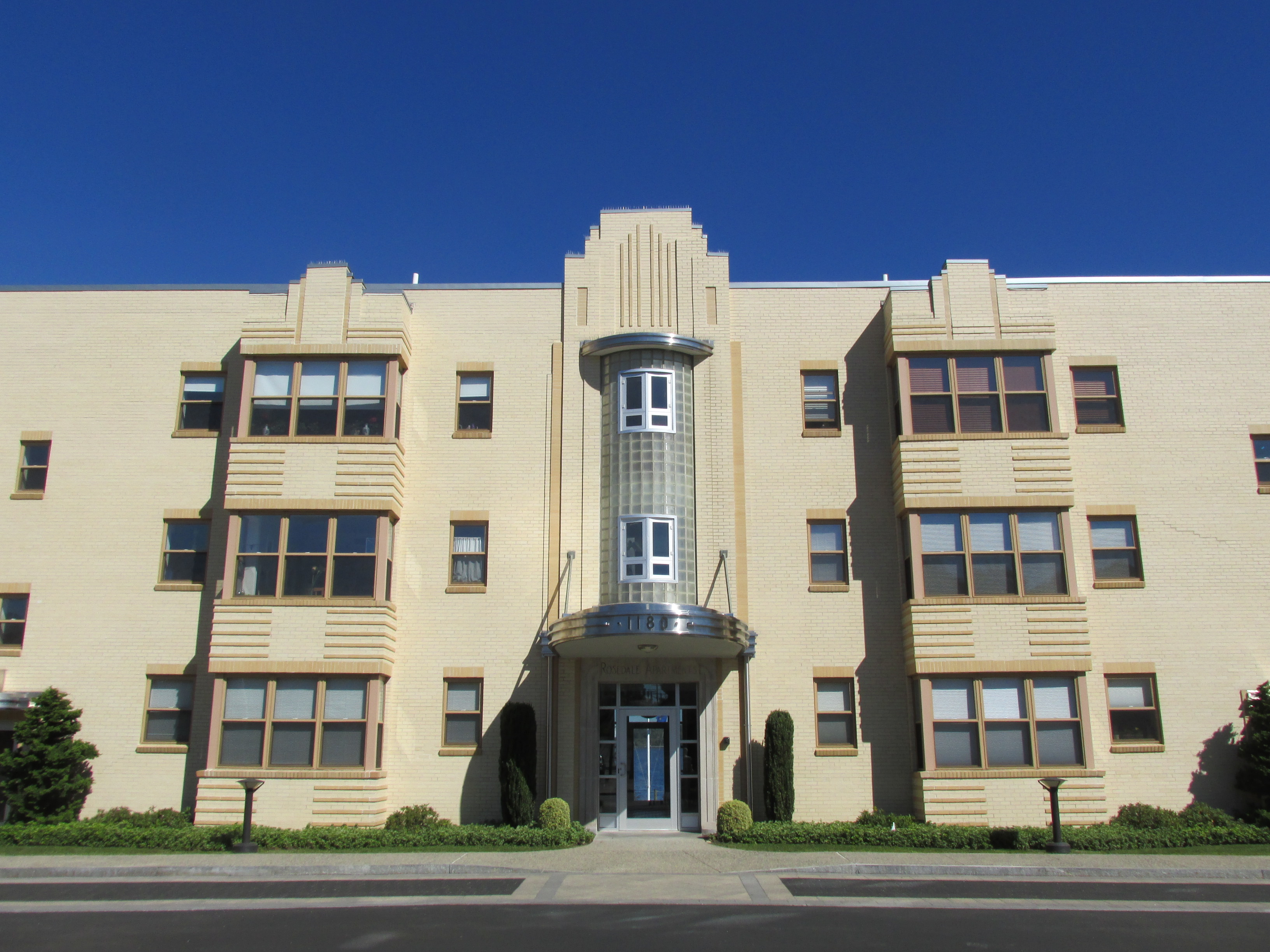
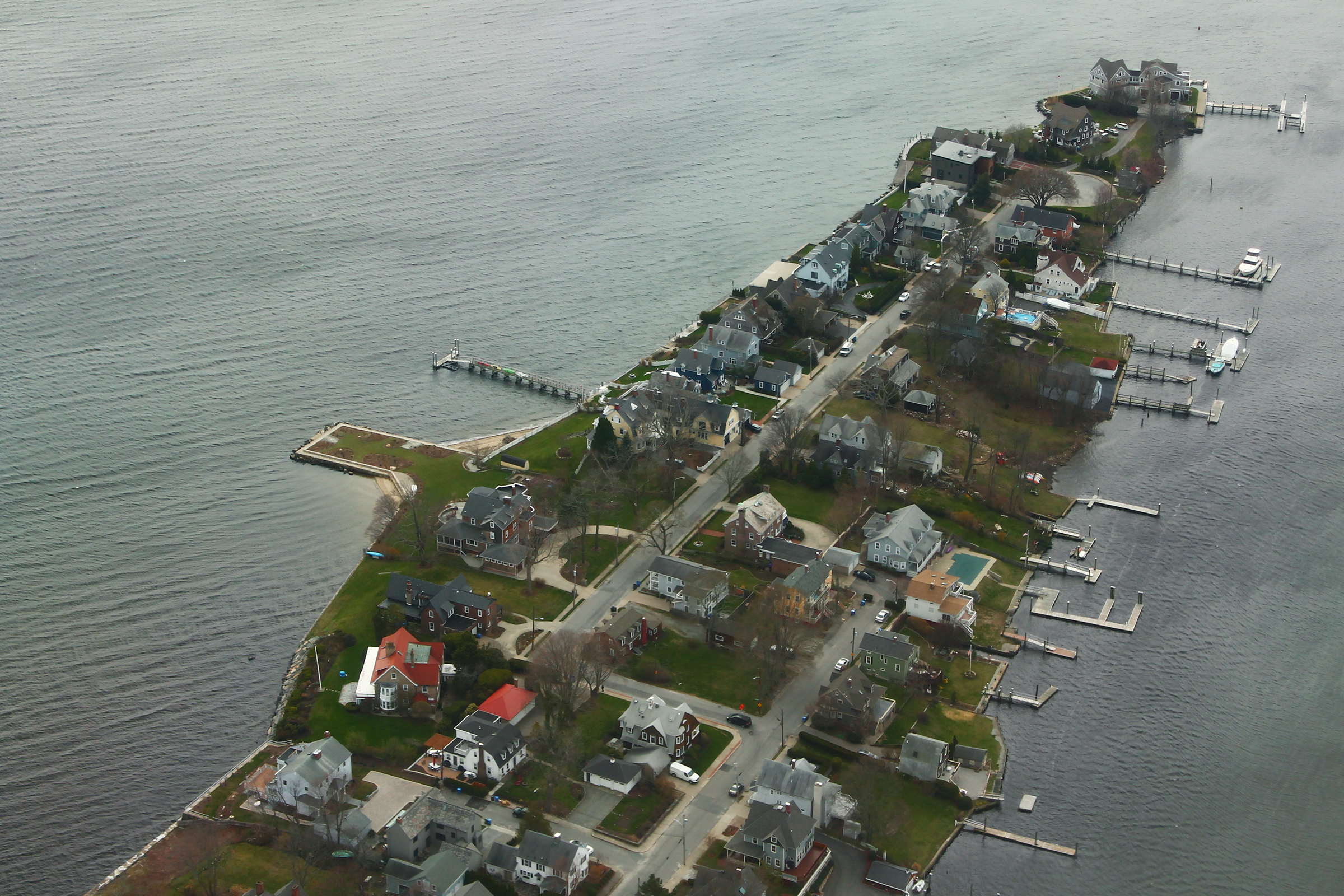
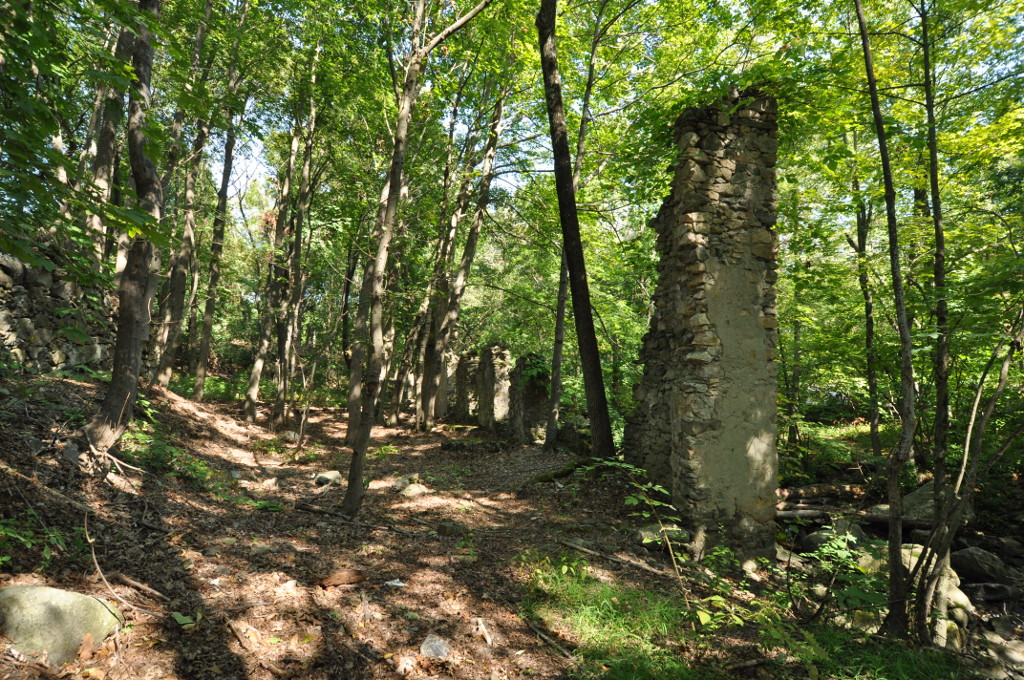
- The William Hall Library, Rosedale Apartments, Pawtuxet Village, the Furnace Hill Brook Historic and Archeological District

- Seal

- Location in Providence County and the state of Rhode Island.
- Coordinates: 41°46′N 71°27′W
- Country: United States
- State: Rhode Island
- County: Providence
- Incorporated (town): 1754
- Incorporated (city): 1910

Government
  - Type: Mayor-council
  - Mayor: Kenneth Hopkins (R)
  - City Council: Emilia Vaziri (D); Richard D. Campopiano (R); Christopher E. Buonanno (R); Bridget R. Graziano (D); Kristen E. Haroian (D); Andy M. Andujar (D); Frank J. Ritz, Jr. (R); Michael A. Traficante (R); Daniel Wall (D)

Area
  - Total: 30.02 sq mi (77.75 km^{2})
  - Land: 28.34 sq mi (73.41 km^{2})
  - Water: 1.67 sq mi (4.33 km^{2})
- Elevation: 66 ft (20 m)

Population (2020)
  - Total: 82,934
  - Density: 2,925.9/sq mi (1,129.68/km^{2})
- Time zone: UTC−5 (EST)
  - Summer (DST): UTC−4 (EDT)
- ZIP Codes: 02823, 02831, 02905, 02907, 02909–02910, 02920–02921
- Area code: 401
- FIPS code: 44-19180
- GNIS feature ID: 1218689
- Website: www.cranstonri.gov

Cranston, formerly known as Pawtuxet, is a city in Providence County, Rhode Island, United States. Its official population in the 2020 United States Census was 82,934, making it the second-largest city in the state. The center of population of Rhode Island is located in Cranston; it is a part of the Providence metropolitan area.

The Town of Cranston was created in 1754 from a portion of Providence north of the Pawtuxet River. After losing much of its territory to neighboring towns and the city of Providence, Cranston became a city on March 10, 1910.

== History ==
Much of the land was purchased by Roger Williams from the Narragansett Indians in 1638 as part of the Pawtuxet Purchase, and the first settler in the area was William Arnold, who was followed shortly by William Harris, William Carpenter, and Zachariah Rhodes. Stephen Arnold, a brother-in-law of Rhodes and William Arnold's, built a gristmill on the Pawtuxet Falls, and laid out the Arnold Road (modern-day Broad Street) connecting it to the Pequot Trail leading to Connecticut. Arnold's son Benedict Arnold became the first governor of Rhode Island under the charter of 1663. Residents could not agree on a name for a new town for decades, and the Town of Cranston was eventually created by the General Assembly in 1754 from a portion of Providence north of the Pawtuxet River. Historians debate whether the town was named after Governor Samuel Cranston, the longest-serving Rhode Island governor, or his grandson Thomas Cranston, who was serving as speaker of the Rhode Island House of Representatives when the town was created. In the early 1770s, town meetings were held at the taverns of Caleb Arnold and Nehemiah Knight, where residents voted in favor of a resolution opposing the British Parliament's Coercive Acts; the town heavily supported the Patriot cause during the Revolutionary War. The town lost much of its territory to neighboring towns and the city of Providence over the 19th century, and Cranston became a city on March 10, 1910.

Many Italian Americans in Cranston are descended from immigrants of Itri, Italy, who settled mainly in the Knightsville section of Cranston during the early 1900s. Cranston is known for its St. Mary's Feast, inspired by the Feast of the Madonna della Civita celebrated in Itri. Since 1905, the St. Mary's Feast has been a week-long festival celebrated in July with vendors, a carnival, fireworks, and a religious procession from St. Mary's Church on Sunday. In 2000, Cranston and Itri became sister cities.

For many years, Cranston was the third-largest city in Rhode Island, after Providence and Warwick, both of which it borders, but in 2017, it surpassed Warwick to take second place. Though Cranston's overall population density was already much greater than the geographically larger Warwick, a major factor contributing to its growth has been a large and semirural section west of Interstate 295, which has seen a high volume of housing development in recent years; Warwick has significantly less open land available for development.

=== Flood of 2010 ===
The Pawtuxet River overflowed in March 2010 after an overwhelming amount of rain. This caused many major sites to be shut down and repaired, such as the Warwick Mall, Contour Dental Laboratories, and the CLCF Building.

== Geography ==
According to the United States Census Bureau, the city has a total area of 29.9 square miles (77 km^{2}), of which 1.4 square miles (3.6 km^{2}) (4.54%) are covered by water. The city occupies roughly 3% of Rhode Island's total land mass.

These neighborhoods and villages are located in Cranston:

- Alpine Estates
- Apple Hill Estates
- Arlington
- Bellefonte
- Castleton Estates
- Auburn
- Dean Estates
- Eden Park
- Edgewood
- Fiskeville (also in Scituate)
- Forest Hills
- Friendly Community
- Garden City
- Garden Hills
- Glen Woods
- Hillside Farms
- Howard
- Jackson (also in Scituate)
- Knightsville
- Laurel Hill
- Meshanticut
- Oak-Hill Terrace
- Oak Lawn
- Orchard Valley Estates
- Pawtuxet Village (also in Warwick)
- Pontiac
- Stadium
- Thornton (this includes part of Johnston)
- Webster
- Westend
- Western Hills Village
- Woodridge

== Demographics ==
Historical population
Census	Pop.	Note	%±
1790	1,990		—
1800	1,644		−17.4%
1810	2,161		31.4%
1820	2,274		5.2%
1830	2,653		16.7%
1840	2,902		9.4%
1850	4,311		48.6%
1860	7,500		74.0%
1870	4,822		−35.7%
1880	5,940		23.2%
1890	8,099		36.3%
1900	13,343		64.7%
1910	21,107		58.2%
1920	29,407		39.3%
1930	42,911		45.9%
1940	47,085		9.7%
1950	55,060		16.9%
1960	66,766		21.3%
1970	74,287		11.3%
1980	71,992		−3.1%
1990	76,060		5.7%
2000	79,269		4.2%
2010	80,387		1.4%
2020	82,934		3.2%
U.S. Decennial Census

=== Racial and ethnic composition ===
Cranston city, Rhode Island – racial and ethnic composition Note: the US Census treats Hispanic/Latino as an ethnic category. This table excludes Latinos from the racial categories and assigns them to a separate category. Hispanics/Latinos may be of any race.
Race / Ethnicity (NH = Non-Hispanic)	2020	2010	2000	1990	1980
White alone (NH)	65.7% (54,454)	77.2% (62,055)	87.2% (69,104)	93.8% (71,323)	98.2% (70,709)
Black alone (NH)	4.9% (4,048)	4.5% (3,654)	3.2% (2,574)	2.2% (1,657)	0.8% (549)
American Indian alone (NH)	0.3% (212)	0.2% (200)	0.3% (211)	0.2% (133)	0% (21)
Asian alone (NH)	6.9% (5,693)	5.1% (4,110)	3.3% (2,591)	1.7% (1,324)	0.3% (246)
Pacific Islander alone (NH)	0% (22)	0% (33)	0% (23)		
Other race alone (NH)	0.6% (509)	0.3% (242)	0.2% (174)	0.1% (91)	0.1% (55)
Multiracial (NH)	3.5% (2,929)	1.7% (1,384)	1.2% (979)	—	—
Hispanic/Latino (any race)	18.2% (15,067)	10.8% (8,709)	4.6% (3,613)	2% (1,532)	0.6% (412)

=== 2020 census ===
As of the 2020 census, Cranston had a population of 82,934, 32,676 households, and 19,522 families, and the median age was 41.2 years; 19.0% of residents were under 18, 8.6% were 18 to 24, 26.9% were 25 to 44, 27.3% were 45 to 64, and 18.2% were 65 or older. For every 100 females, there were 95.3 males, and for every 100 females 18 and over, there were 94.0 males age 18 and over. About 99.4% of the residents lived in urban areas, while 0.6% lived in rural areas. The population density was 2,925.9 per square mile (1,129.7/km^{2}). The 34,182 housing units had an average density of 1,205.9 per square mile (465.6/km^{2}). Of the 32,676 households in Cranston, 27.9% had children under 18 living in them, 43.7% were married-couple households, 17.6% were households with a male householder and no spouse or partner present, and 31.1% were households with a female householder and no spouse or partner present; about 30.0% of all households were made up of individuals, and 13.7% had someone living alone who was 65 or older. Of the 34,182 housing units, 4.4% were vacant, with a homeowner vacancy rate of 1.0% and a rental vacancy rate of 3.7%. The 2016–2020 five-year American Community Survey estimates reported the average household size was 2.5 and the average family size was 3.2. The percent of those 25 and older with a bachelor's degree or higher was estimated to be 25.0% of the population. The 2016–2020 ACS estimates show that the median household income was $74,425 (with a margin of error of +/- $3,217) and the median family income was $89,180 (+/- $3,837). The median income for those above 16 years old was $42,882 (+/- $1,971). About 4.1% of families and 7.4% of the population were below the poverty line, including 8.2% of those under 18 and 8.8% of those 65 or over. The racial makeup was 68.14% White (65.66% non-Hispanic White), 5.65% Black or African American, 0.58% Native American or Alaska Native, 6.99% Asian, 0.05% Pacific Islander or Native Hawaiian, 9.99% from other races, and 8.59% (7,126) from two or more races]. Hispanics or Latinos of any race were 18.17% (15,067) of the population.

Racial composition as of the 2020 census
Race	Number	Percentage
White	56,514	68.1%
Black or African American	4,683	5.6%
American Indian and Alaska Native	485	0.6%
Asian	5,799	7.0%
Native Hawaiian and other Pacific Islander	45	0.1%
Some other race	8,282	10.0%
Two or more races	7,126	8.6%
Hispanic or Latino (of any race)	15,067	18.2%

The most reported ancestries in 2020 were:

- Italian (24.7%)
- Irish (16.1%)
- English (10.7%)
- Dominican (7.4%)
- French (6.2%)
- Portuguese (5.8%)
- German (4.7%)
- Puerto Rican (2.9%)
- Cambodian (2.6%)
- Guatemalan (2.5%)

The most common Hispanic background in Cranston is Dominican American and Puerto Rican, reflective of Rhode Island's Latino population as a whole. Also, a relatively large Cambodian American population is centered around Park and Pontiac Avenues in the center of the city. Italian Americans are still the predominant ethnicity throughout Cranston, numbered at 38% of the population. This gives Cranston one of the largest Italian-American communities in the United States, similar to neighboring Johnston and North Providence, Rhode Island.

== Economy ==
Companies with corporate headquarters in Cranston include jewelry maker Alex and Ani and Coastway Community Bank. The first Del's Lemonade stand was opened in Cranston in 1948. Its headquarters are currently located off of the Oak-Hill Terrace neighborhood.

== Arts and culture ==
=== Sites ===
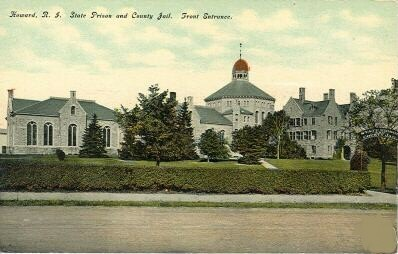
Howard Prison in Cranston, c. 1900

The first automobile race track in the country, Narragansett Park, (Note: Not to be confused with Narragansett Park, a Thoroughbred horse track, located in Pawtucket, RI, which closed in 1978) located off Park Avenue, opened at present-day Stadium Ball Field in 1867 as a trotting track.

The Budlong Pool, located at 198 Aqueduct Road, off Reservoir Avenue (part of RI 2), is the city's only public pool. Budlong, which is much larger than an Olympic-sized swimming pool, was built in the 1930s as a Works Progress Administration project. The pool was closed in 2019 after an architect's report stated that the pool was "close to the end of its serviceable life” and would cost $2 million to repair. The pool has since become a subject of political debate in the city. Mayor Ken Hopkins proposed in 2023 to completely replace the aging structure with a new, $3.5-million redesign, which at 7,000 square feet, would be one-third the current size. About 2,000 Cranston residents signed a petition opposing the project.

Sprague Mansion, an 18th-century homestead, is listed on the National Register of Historic Places. The Thomas Fenner House, built around 1677, is one of the oldest houses in Rhode Island. Edgewood Yacht Club has long been popular among local sailors, and is an historic landmark located on the Providence River.

== Sports ==
=== Little League ===
- 1996 United States Champions (CWLL)
- 2015 New England Champions (CWLL)

== Government ==
Cranston city vote by party in presidential elections
Year	GOP	DEM	Others
2024	45.67% 18,638	51.88% 21,168	2.45% 1000
2020	42.22% 17,313	56.12% 23,039	1.71% 701
2016	43.30% 15,934	50.99% 18,763	5.70% 2,099
2012	37.20% 13,008	61.16% 21,388	1.64% 574
2008	37.72% 13,981	60.76% 22,520	1.51% 561
2004	40.95% 14,471	57.54% 20,331	1.51% 532
2000	31.00% 10,420	63.09% 21,204	5.90% 1,984
1996	26.71% 9,098	61.37% 20,901	11.92% 4,059
1992	31.45% 12,450	46.96% 18,589	21.59% 8,549
1988	46.33% 17,129	53.32% 19,711	0.35% 128

The Rhode Island Department of Corrections has its headquarters and its adult prison facilities in Cranston. The Rhode Island Department of Children, Youth & Families operates the Rhode Island Training School, a juvenile correctional facility, in Cranston. The Rhode Island Division of Motor Vehicles is headquartered in Cranston.

The City of Cranston operates under a mayor-council form of government. General city elections are held on the first Tuesday after the first Monday in November in even-numbered years. Terms for elected officials begin on the first Monday in January of the year following their election. The city council consists of nine members, one representing each of the city's six wards, and three city-wide representatives. Council members are elected to a two-year term, and are limited to five consecutive terms. The current Cranston city council president is Daniel Wall. The council elected for the 2025–2027 term has a 5–4 Democratic majority.

The current mayor, Kenneth J. Hopkins, was sworn in on January 6, 2025, following his re-election to a second four-year term in November 2024. Hopkins succeeded Mayor Allan Fung, the state's first Asian-American mayor, who served four terms from 2009 to 2021. As of 2012, mayors may be elected to no more than two consecutive four-year terms.

In the Rhode Island Senate, Cranston is split into four senatorial districts, all represented by Democrats: Todd M. Patalano (District 26), Hanna M. Gallo (District 27), Lammis J. Vargas (District 28), and Matthew LaMountain (District 31). The city is divided into all or parts of nine Rhode Island House of Representatives districts, including Districts 14, 15, 16, 17, 18, 19, 20, 41, and 42. At the federal level, Cranston is a part of Rhode Island's 2nd congressional district and is currently represented by Democrat Seth Magaziner.

In presidential elections, Cranston is reliably Democratic, as no Republican presidential nominee has won the city in over three decades. Donald Trump was the first Republican since George W. Bush in 2004 to cross 40%, as well as having the best showing in 2024.

== Education ==
The school district is Cranston School District.

Public high schools:

- Cranston High School East
- Cranston High School West

Public middle schools:

- Western Hills Middle School
- Hugh B. Bain Middle School
- Park View Middle School
- Hope Highlands Middle School

Public elementary schools:

- Arlington Elementary School
- Chester Barrows Elementary School
- William R. Dutemple Elementary School
- Eden Park Elementary School
- Edgewood Highlands Elementary School
- Garden City Elementary School
- Gladstone Elementary School
- Glen Hills Elementary School
- Oak Lawn Elementary School
- Orchard Farms Elementary School
- George J. Peters Elementary School
- Edward S. Rhodes Elementary School
- Stadium Elementary School
- Stone Hill Elementary School
- Daniel D. Waterman Elementary School
- Woodridge Elementary School

Other public schools:

- Cranston Area Career and Technical Center

Private schools:

- Immaculate Conception Catholic Regional School (Roman Catholic Diocese of Providence)
- Saint Paul School

== Infrastructure ==
=== Transportation ===
Four freeways travel through Cranston: I-95, I-295, RI 10 (the Huntington Expressway), and RI 37. Other state-numbered roads in Cranston are US 1, US 1A, RI 2, RI 5, RI 12, RI 33, RI 51, RI 115, and RI 117.

Cranston is served by Rhode Island Public Transit Authority buses. Amtrak's Northeast Corridor passes through, but has no station in the city. The MBTA's Providence/Stoughton Line also passes through, but does not include a station in Cranston, but a station stop has been proposed. Currently, the nearest MBTA stations are in Providence and Warwick at T.F. Green Airport, the former which is also served by Amtrak.

== In popular culture ==
- Quahog, Rhode Island, the primary setting of the animated sitcom Family Guy, is modeled after Cranston according to the show's creator Seth MacFarlane.

== Sister city ==
- Itri, Lazio, Italy

== Friendship cities ==
- Stepanakert, Artsakh
