= Fiskeville, Rhode Island =

Village in Rhode Island, United States

Coordinates: 41°44′03″N 71°32′53″W

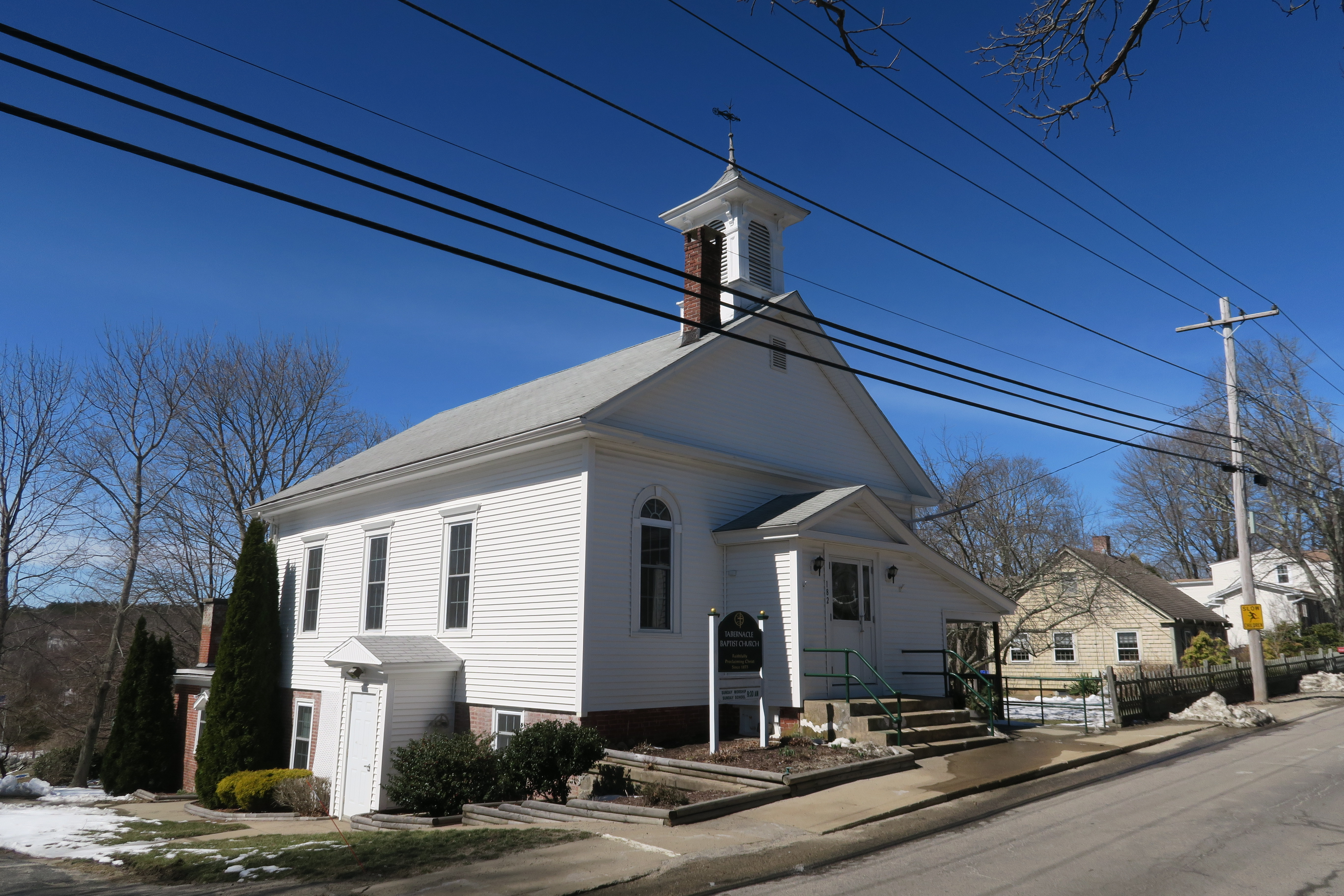
Tabernacle Baptist Church

Fiskeville is a small village in the south west corner of Cranston, Rhode Island, United States, the south east corner of the Town of Scituate, Rhode Island and across the northern side of Coventry, Rhode Island. The village's Main Street forms the border between Cranston and Scituate. Fiskeville grew up as one of several mill towns along the Pawtuxet River in the mid-1800s. The Fiskeville textile mill was formed by Dr. Caleb Fiske, a Revolutionary War doctor turned businessman in 1812. The village became home to those who worked in the mill, mostly immigrants from Portugal, France, Italy and England. Fiskeville is usually associated with Cranston rather than with Scituate as most of the original buildings including Dr. Fiske's residence were in Cranston. Although the mill and about a dozen nearby mill houses were in Scituate. Poets Karen Haskell and Darcie Dennigan both grew up, a few doors down from each other, in the 1970s and 1980s on Main Street in Fiskeville.

Fiskeville is the only Cranston neighborhood that is not provided normal mail delivery by the United States Postal Service, as residents are only eligible for a Post Office Box at the one-room Fiskeville Post Office. On April 22, 2024, the Cranston City Council voted unanimously to request that USPS establish regular mail delivery for Fiskeville residents, following decades of complaints to city officials about undeliverable mail, difficulties registering to vote, and other quality of life issues resulting from Fiskeville residents' street addresses not being recognized by USPS.
