= Edgewood Yacht Club =

- Burgee
- Short name: EYC
- Founded: 1889
- Location: Cranston, Rhode Island
- Owner: Privately owned along with Brown University

Edgewood Yacht Club is a historic yacht club in Cranston, Rhode Island at 3 Shaw Avenue.

The Edgewood Yacht Club was founded in 1889 and incorporated in 1902.

== Clubhouses ==
- Edgewood Yacht Club
- U.S. National Register of Historic Places
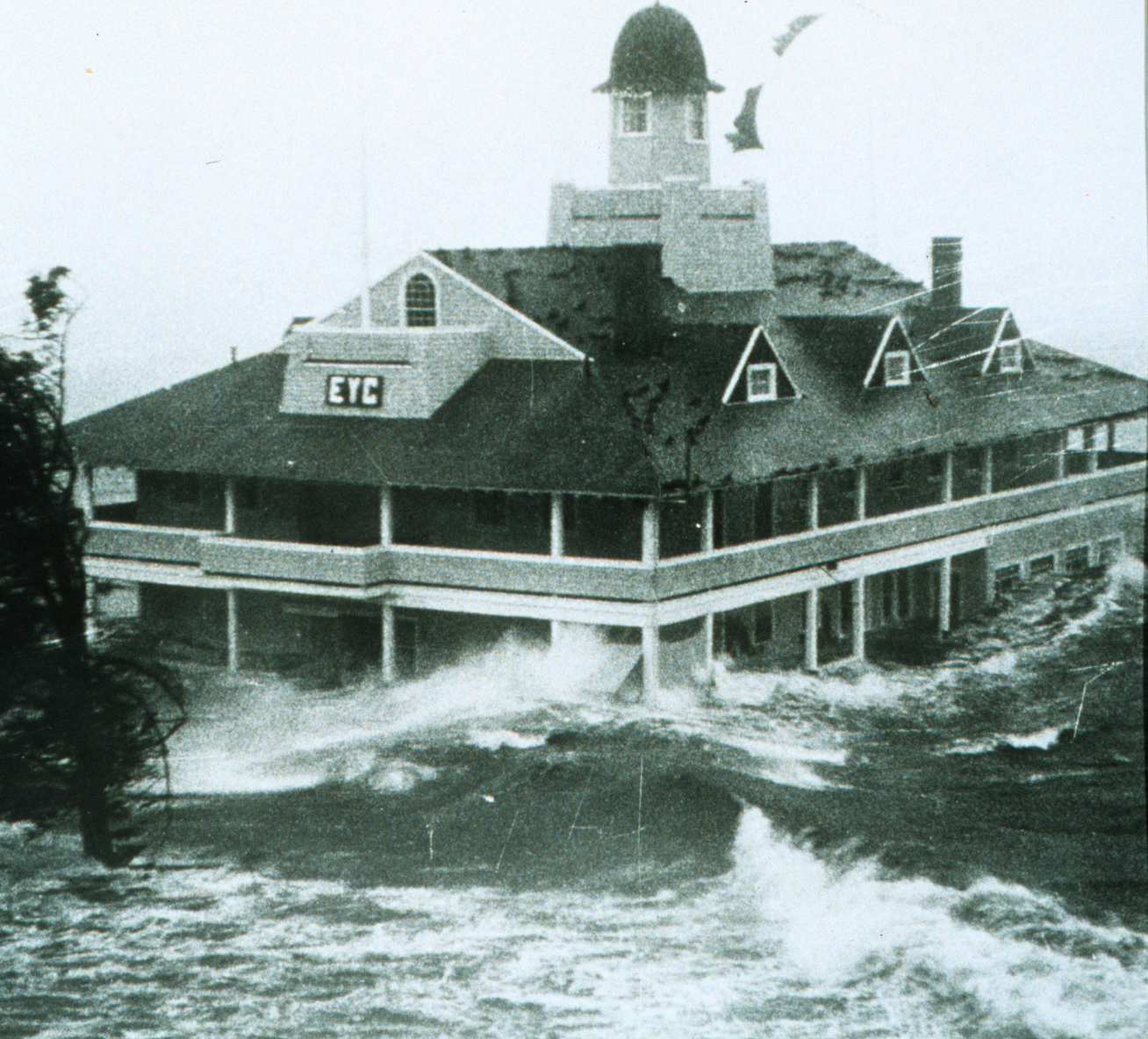
- The EYC during the height of the 1954 storm surge

- Location within Rhode Island Location within the United States
- Location: Cranston, Rhode Island
- Coordinates: 41°46′34″N 71°23′26″W
- Built: 1908
- Architect: Murphy, Hindle & Wright
- Architectural style: Shingle Style
- NRHP reference No.: 89000072
- Added to NRHP: February 23, 1989

A fire in 1908 destroyed the original building, and the structure was rebuilt that same year. The club was constructed by Murphy, Hindle & Wright in 1908 in a shingle style. The building was constructed on pilings over the Providence River, and is especially notable for having survived the storm surge that accompanied the 1938 Hurricane, as well as the one that occurred during Hurricane Carol in 1954. The clubhouse was added to the National Register of Historic Places on February 23, 1989. The entire building was destroyed again by fire during the early morning hours of Wednesday, January 12, 2011. The fire began shortly after 4:00 am EST by lightning during an intense snowstorm; by 5:30 am, the building was gone. No one was injured, and officers said they plan to rebuild. What was left of the building was razed, save for the pilings, which supported a wooden dock until the club was rebuilt. The slips and mooring field remained operational. Rebuilding of the new building started in March 2016 and was completed and opened in the Spring of 2018, just in time for the next sailing season. The new building was designed by Donald Richardson and resembles key architectural elements of the original building.

The Edgewood Yacht Club building also houses the Ted Turner Sailing Pavilion, which is home to Brown University's Sailing Team. The Pavilion is named after CNN's founder, Ted Turner, an avid sailor, America's Cup defender in 1977 and a Brown Alumnus.

== See also ==
- National Register of Historic Places listings in Providence County, Rhode Island
