= Knightsville, Rhode Island =

Neighborhood in Rhode Island, United States

Coordinates: 41°47′N 71°28′W

Knightsville is an urban neighborhood in the city of Cranston, Rhode Island.

== History ==
Knightsville is named after local inn keeper and U.S. Congressman Nehemiah Knight (1746–1808). The Knights were descendants of early English immigrants who were some of the earliest settlers in the area. Early town meetings in the 18th century were held in Caleb Arnold's tavern, Nehemiah Knight's tavern (currently on the site of present city building), and the old Knightsville Meetinghouse. In 1843 Amasa Sprague, a textile entrepreneur, was beaten to death near what is now St. Ann Cemetery. His alleged murderer, John Gordon, was the last person executed in Rhode Island. By the turn of the 20th century, the city was home to various thriving businesses and industries, attracting large numbers of European immigrants. Many residents are now Italian-American, with many able to trace their lineage to Itri, a small Italian village approximately halfway between Rome and Naples.

== Cultural attractions ==
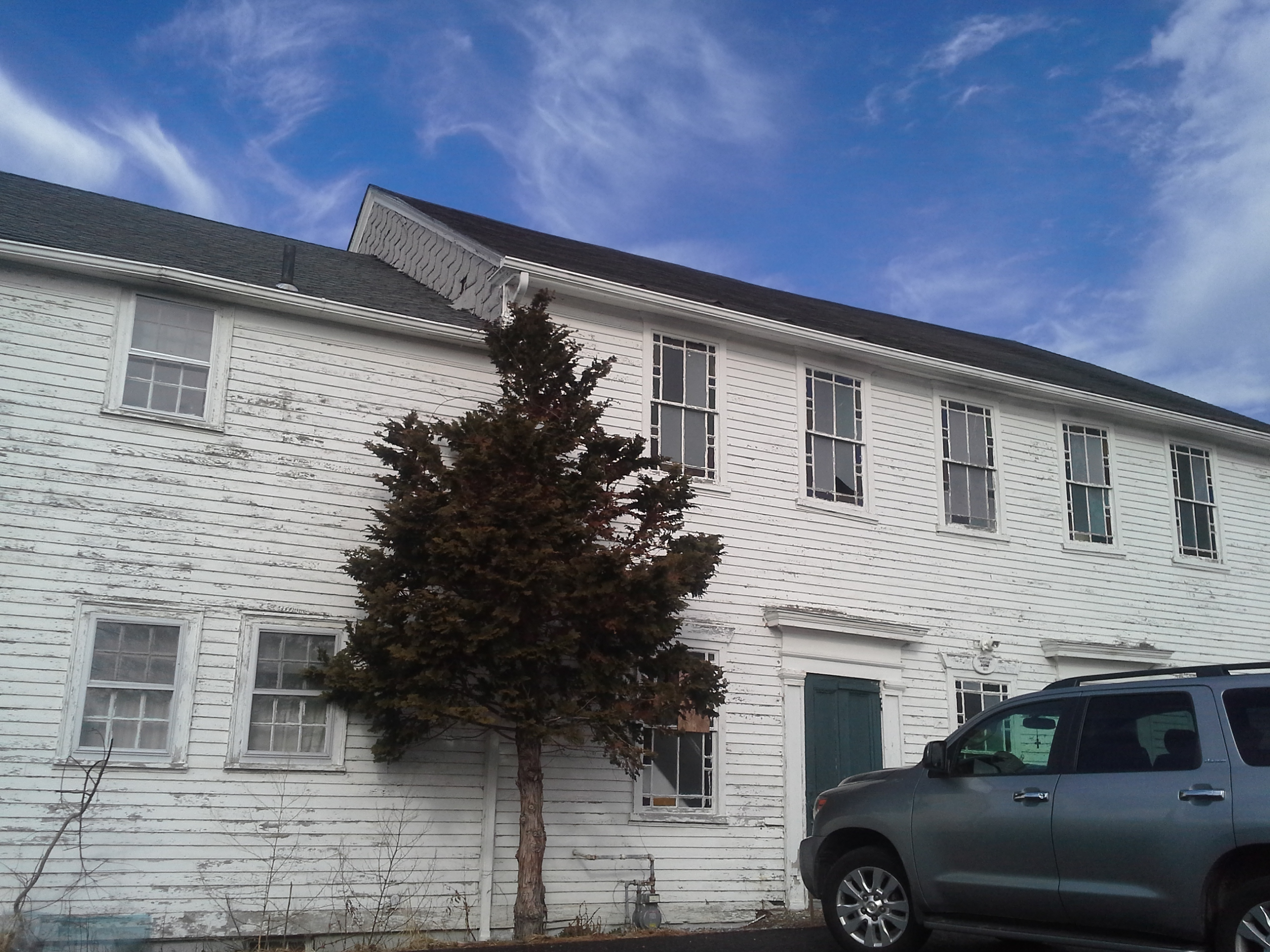
The historic Knightsville Meetinghouse, built in 1807.

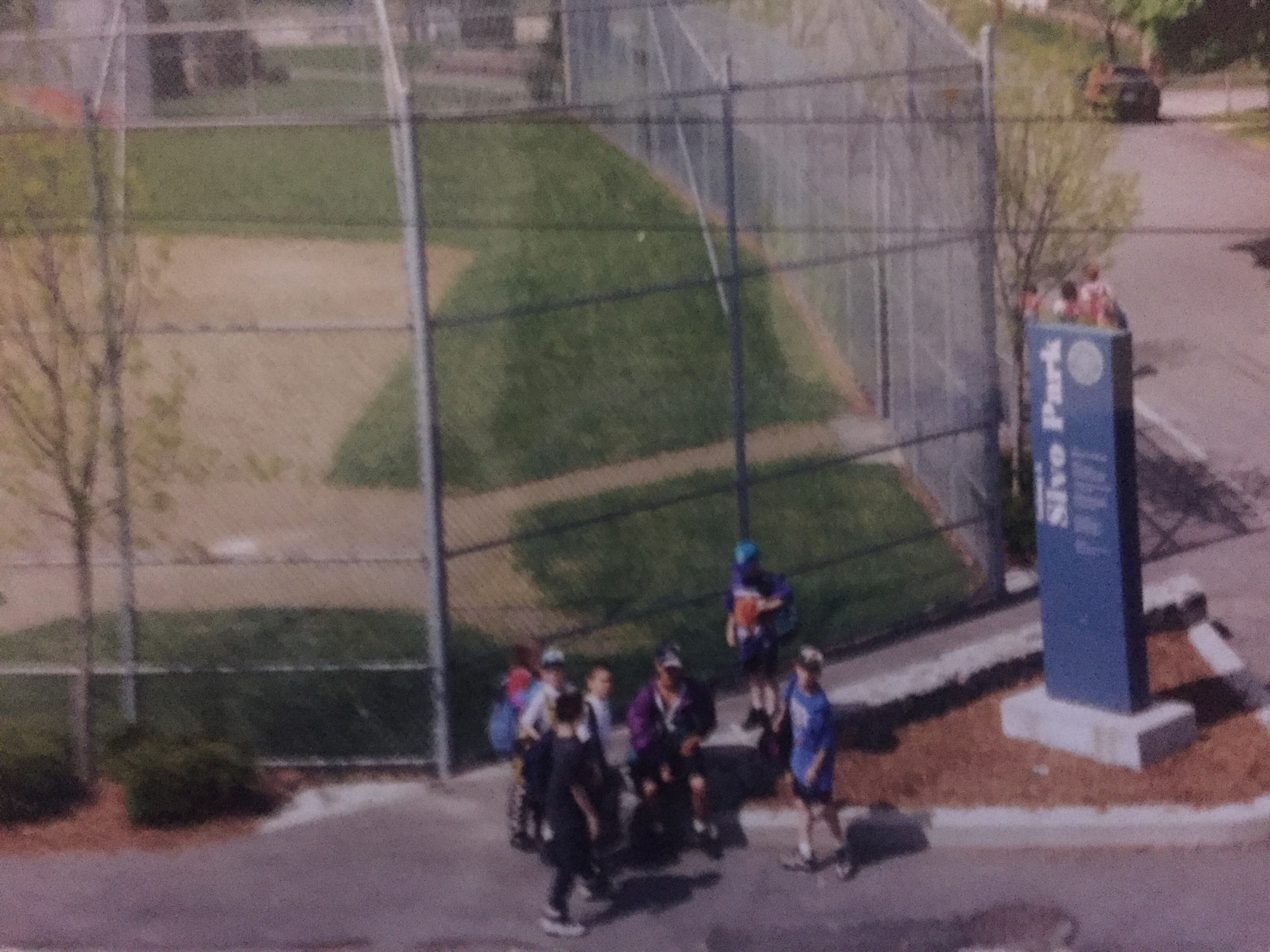
Anthony J. Sivo Park in the early 1990s.

The historic Knightsville Meetinghouse, built in 1807, was located within the village but demolished in December 2015. The neighborhood also features church celebrations including the Feast of Saint Mary, under the title of Maria Santissima della Civita (or la Madonna della Civita), a week-long celebration featuring a carnival, fireworks, and a religious procession. It is held every July and attracts thousands of visitors. The actual feast day is July 21, and is celebrated the closest weekend to that date. Knightsville is home to several churches, including St. Mary's, St. Ann's, and Knightsville-Franklin Congregational Church. The neighborhood also has a public library, The Knightsville Branch. Knightsville is also the home of PFC Anthony J. Sivo, who was killed in action in Vietnam in 1968. Anthony J. Sivo Park was built in his honor on November 11, 1991.

== See also ==
- Cranston, Rhode Island
- Nehemiah Knight
- Knightsville Meeting House
