= Champlin Foundations =

Oldest philanthropic organization groups in Rhode Island

The Champlin Foundations are private foundations that make direct grants to tax exempt organizations and are one of the oldest philanthropic organization groups in Rhode Island. The majority of grants are made to organizations located in Rhode Island. The majority of grants are for capital needs. Capital needs may consist of equipment, construction, renovations, the purchase of real property and reduction of mortgage indebtedness. PNC Bank/Delaware is the trustee of each foundation.

== News ==
- 100 acres added to protected forest
- USS Saratoga Museum Foundation
- VNA of Care New England Receives Grant from The Champlin Foundations
- Friends of Hearthside receives grant to fix roof and portico
- Providence Athenaeum receives grant to renovate the bound periodical and rare book area
- $544K grant funds new Knight Memorial Library facade
