= Jackson, Rhode Island =

Unincorporated community in Rhode Island

Coordinates: 41°44′19″N 71°32′58″W

Jackson, Rhode Island is an unincorporated area outlying, to the northwest of West Warwick.
