= National Register of Historic Places listings in Smithfield, Rhode Island =

This is a list of Registered Historic Places in Smithfield, Rhode Island.

Contents: Counties in Rhode Island

Bristol | Kent | Newport | Providence (Pawtucket | Providence (city) | Woonsocket) | Washington

This National Park Service list is complete through NPS recent listings posted May 1, 2026.

	Name on the Register	Image	Date listed	Location	City or town	Description
1	Allenville Mill Storehouse	Allenville Mill Storehouse	January 20, 1972 (#72000033)	5 Esmond St. 41°52′41″N 71°30′09″W	Smithfield	
2	Angell–Ballou House	Angell–Ballou House	March 18, 2004 (#04000196)	49 Ridge Rd. 41°53′42″N 71°30′05″W	Smithfield	
3	Georgiaville Historic District	Georgiaville Historic District	October 3, 1985 (#85002734)	Roughly bounded by Stillwater Rd., Cross St., Whipple Ave., and Farnum Pike; 41°53′18″N 71°30′26″W	Smithfield	
4	Saint Thomas Episcopal Church and Rectory	Saint Thomas Episcopal Church and Rectory	July 2, 1987 (#87000993)	Putnam Pike; 41°52′16″N 71°33′12″W	Smithfield	
5	Smith–Appleby House	Smith–Appleby House	May 1, 1974 (#74000005)	Stillwater Rd. southeast of its junction with Capron Rd. 41°54′07″N 71°31′06″W	Smithfield	
6	Smithfield Exchange Bank	Smithfield Exchange Bank	April 19, 2006 (#06000295)	599 Putnam Pike; 41°52′26″N 71°33′12″W	Smithfield	
7	Ira B. Sweet House	Ira B. Sweet House	January 15, 2010 (#08000715)	38 Esmond St. 41°52′31″N 71°30′13″W	Smithfield	
8	Waterman–Winsor Farm	Waterman–Winsor Farm	June 27, 1980 (#80000012)	79 Austin Ave. 41°52′55″N 71°33′45″W	Smithfield	
9	Stephen Winsor House	Stephen Winsor House	October 6, 1975 (#75000004)	113 Austin Ave. 41°53′08″N 71°33′55″W	Smithfield	Listed at 93 Austin Ave.
10	Woonasquatucket River Site (RI-163)	Woonasquatucket River Site (RI-163)	November 1, 1984 (#84000364)	near Farnum Pike; 41°54′33″N 71°32′21″W	Smithfield	

== See also ==
- National Register of Historic Places listings in Providence County, Rhode Island
- List of National Historic Landmarks in Rhode Island
