= Nathan B. Sprague =

Nathan Brown Sprague

Speaker of the Rhode Island House of Representatives
- In office October 1826 – October 1827
- Preceded by: Samuel W. Bridgham
- Succeeded by: Job Durfee

Personal details
- Born: April 7, 1787 Johnston, Rhode Island
- Died: April 17, 1864 (aged 77) Greenville, Rhode Island
- Spouse: Sarah Smith (m. 1813; died 1864)
- Children: 5
- Parent(s): Daniel Sprague Jr. Hannah Brown

Nathan Brown Sprague (April 7, 1787 – April 17, 1864) was a Rhode Island farmer and politician.

== Early life ==
Sprague was born on April 7, 1787, in Johnston, Rhode Island. He was a son of Daniel Sprague Jr. (1752–1816) and Hannah (née Brown) Sprague (1756–1815).

His paternal grandparents were also named Daniel Sprague (son of Ebenezer Sprague) and Hannah (née Brown) Sprague. His maternal grandparents were Gideon Brown Sr. and Ruth (née Rutenburg) Brown.

== Career ==
Sprague was a member of the Rhode Island House of Representatives for eleven years, and served as the Speaker of the House from October 1826 to October 1827. In 1828, he served as a presidential elector.

In 1811, he was a charter trustee of the Greene Academy. In 1822, he was one of the original incorporators of the Smithfield Exchange Bank, which provided services to farmers and small businesses throughout northwestern Rhode Island, and of which he was the first president. He was also an incorporator of Saint Thomas Episcopal Church in the village of Greenville in Smithfield, Rhode Island.

== Personal life ==
On April 15, 1813, Sprague was married to Sarah Smith (1788–1875), a daughter of Anna and Darius Smith, in Glocester. Together, they were the parents of:

- Esther Sprague (1814–1834), who died unmarried.
- Daniel Sprague (1816–1855), who married Abigail A. Farnum.
- John Smith Sprague (1827–1903), who married Lolotini Phetteplace, a daughter of George Thornton Phetteplace, in 1860.
- Hannah Brown Sprague (1819–1888), who died unmarried.

Sprague died on April 17, 1864, in Greenville, Rhode Island.
