= Greenville Public Library (Rhode Island) =

Public library in Rhode Island, United States

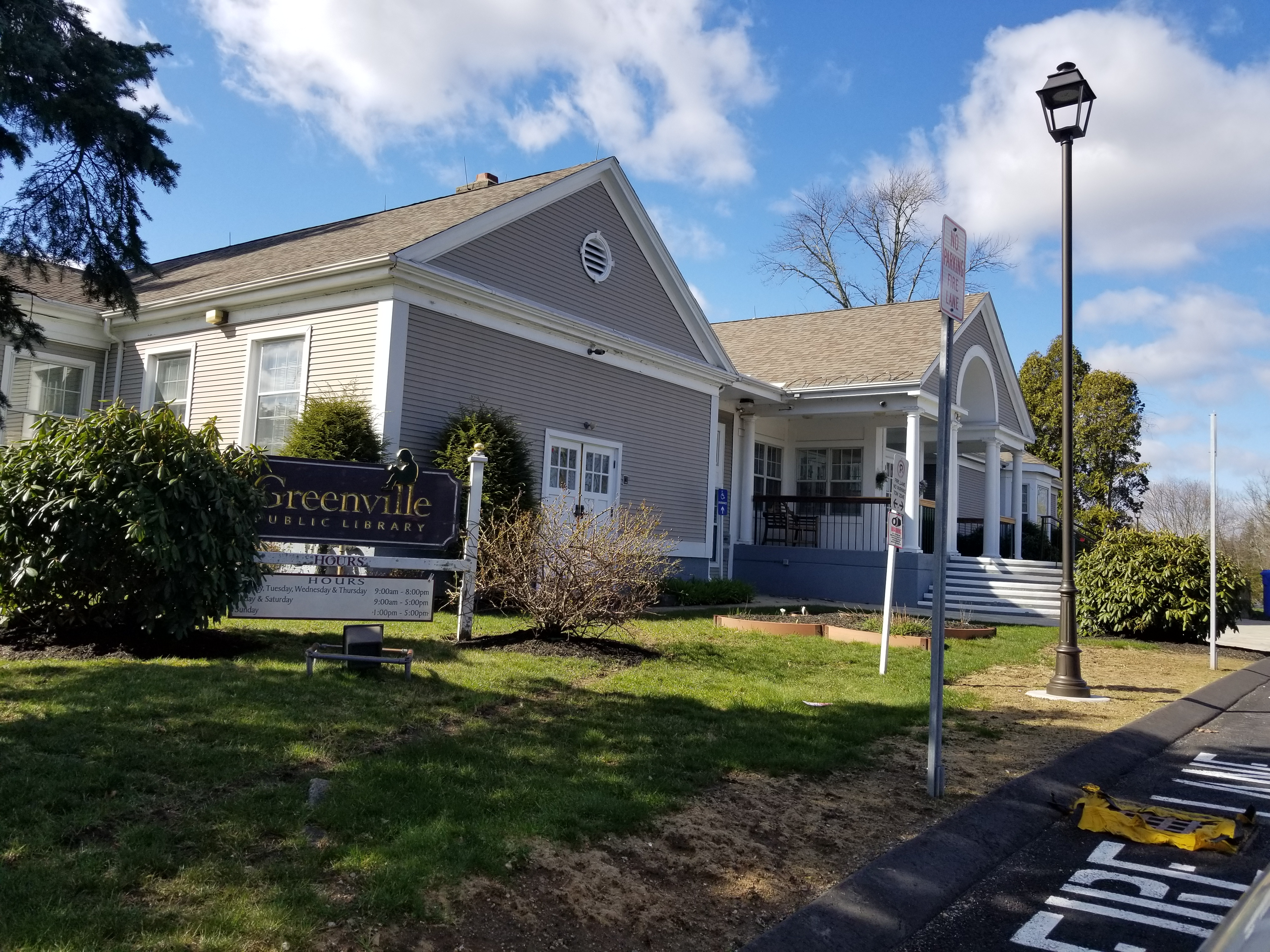
- 41.8711°N 71.5492°W
- Location: Village of Greenville in Smithfield, Rhode Island, United States of America
- Type: Public Library
- Branches: 1

Collection
- Size: 115,574

Access and use
- Circulation: 151,307
- Population served: 21,000

Other information
- Website: http://www.yourlibrary.ws/

Greenville Public Library is a public library at 573 Putnam Pike in the village of Greenville in the town of Smithfield, Rhode Island.

== History ==
The Greenville Public Library was founded in 1882 and was originally located on the Greenville Common near St. Thomas Church and Greenville Baptist Church and served Smithfield and the surrounding towns. In 1883 William Winsor, one of the original Library incorporators, donated the library collection of the Lapham Institute, a former Free Baptist school founded in 1839, to the Greenville Public Library. In 1956 the library moved up the hill from its original downtown Greenville location into a new building onto which two large additions were constructed in the late twentieth century.

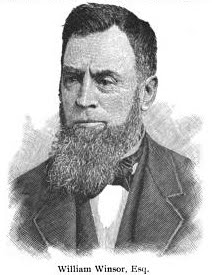
William Winsor, was a co-founder and donor of a large collection of books to the library in 1883

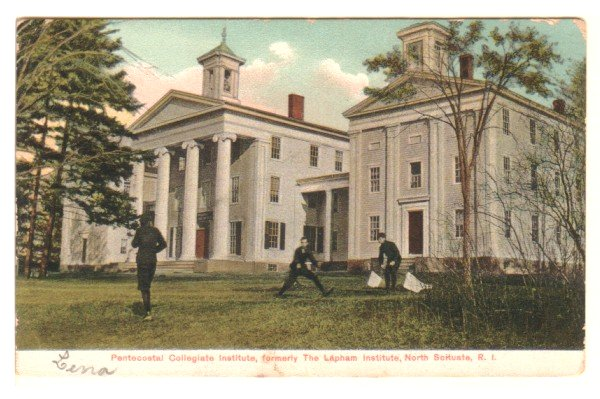
The Lapham Institute (1839) in Scituate where much of the original library collection originated in 1883

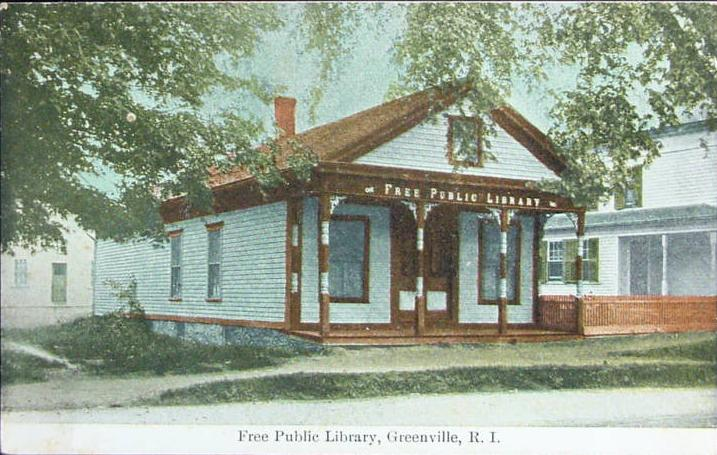
Old Greenville Public Library building, in downtown Greenville.

== See also ==
- East Smithfield Public Library
- List of libraries in Rhode Island
