= John Steer =

John Steer may refer to:

- John Steer (merchant) (1824–1918), English-born Canadian merchant and politician
- John Steer (politician) (1919–1968), Australian politician
- John Steer (art historian) (1928–2012), English art historian

== See also ==
- John Steere
