= William Winsor (banker) =

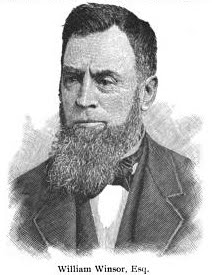
William Winsor of Greenville in Smithfield, Rhode Island

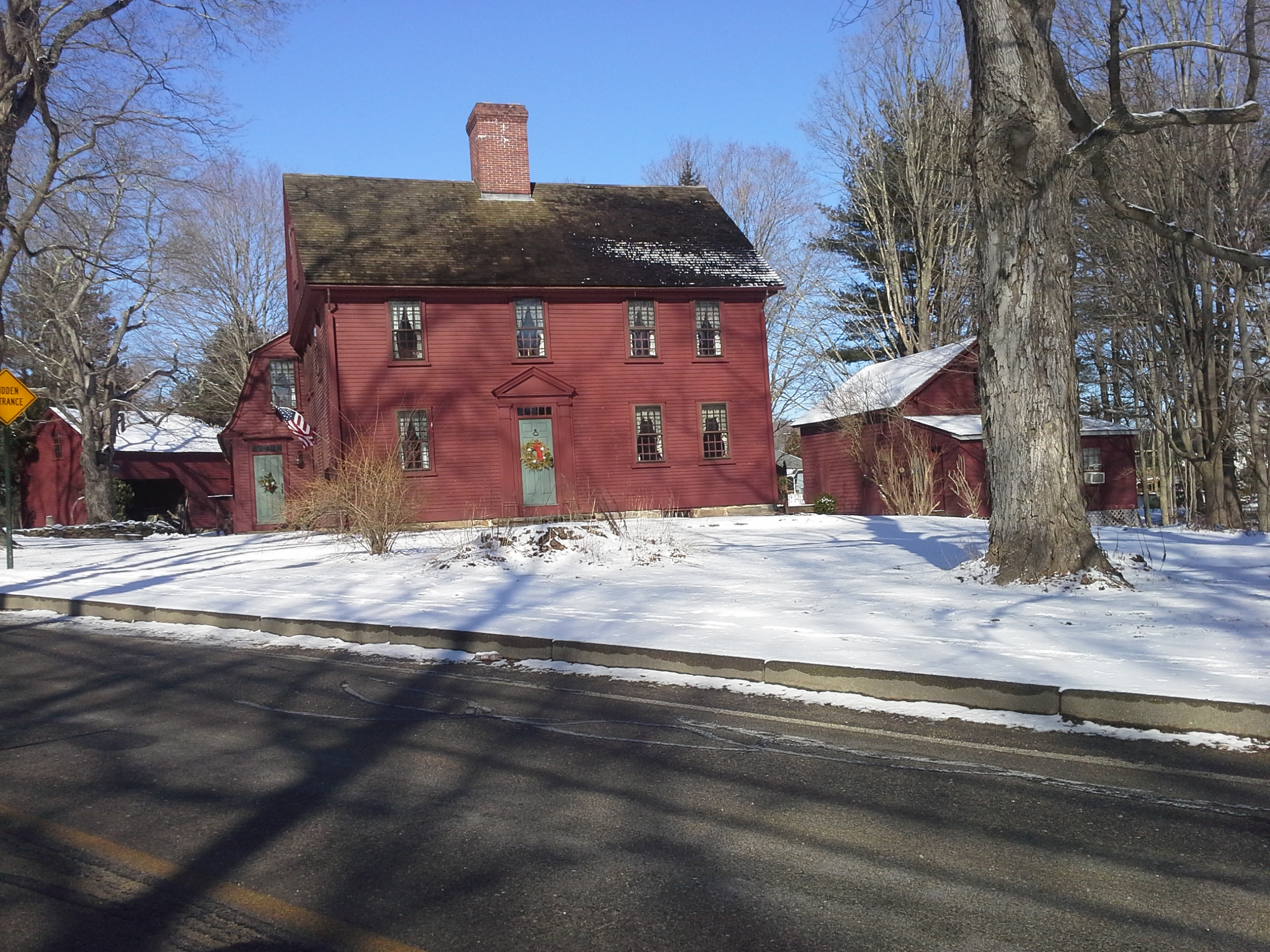
the Waterman–Winsor Farm

William Winsor (1819–1904) was a philanthropist, town treasurer, bank officer, farmer, supporter of education, and co-founder of the Greenville Public Library. He was from Smithfield, Rhode Island where the William Winsor School was named after him.

William Winsor was born in Greenville, Rhode Island in 1819 and grew up working on the family's farm. Winsor was a direct descendant of some of the early settlers who purchased Smithfield from the Native Americans and who built the Waterman–Winsor Farm. Winsor attended the Smithville Seminary in Scituate from 1841 to 1842 and after graduation taught school in the District schools in the Smithfield area. William Winsor married Harriet Steere in 1844 and then had one son, Nicholas Winsor. In 1845 he replaced his uncle as cashier of the Smithfield Exchange Bank in Greenville and later became cashier of the National Exchange Bank, and then he eventually became treasurer of the Smithfield Savings Bank. During the American Civil War Winsor was appointed to a committee to provide bounties to Smithfield men who enlisted to fight for the Union cause. In 1881 he was one of the original incorporators of the Greenville Public Library and donated the library collection of the Lapham Institute to the Public Library. Winsor was an active member of Greenville Free Will Baptist Church and donated greatly to Free Will Baptist educational organizations including the Lapham Institute in Scituate, Bates College in Maine, and Storer College, a school for freed slaves in West Virginia founded after the Civil War. He also served as Smithfield's town treasurer.

In 1933 the William Winsor School opened on Putnam Pike in Greenville, after the PTA asked the School committee to name the school after William Winsor because of all he had given to support education locally and nationally.
