= East Smithfield Public Library =

Public library in Esmond, Rhode Island, United States

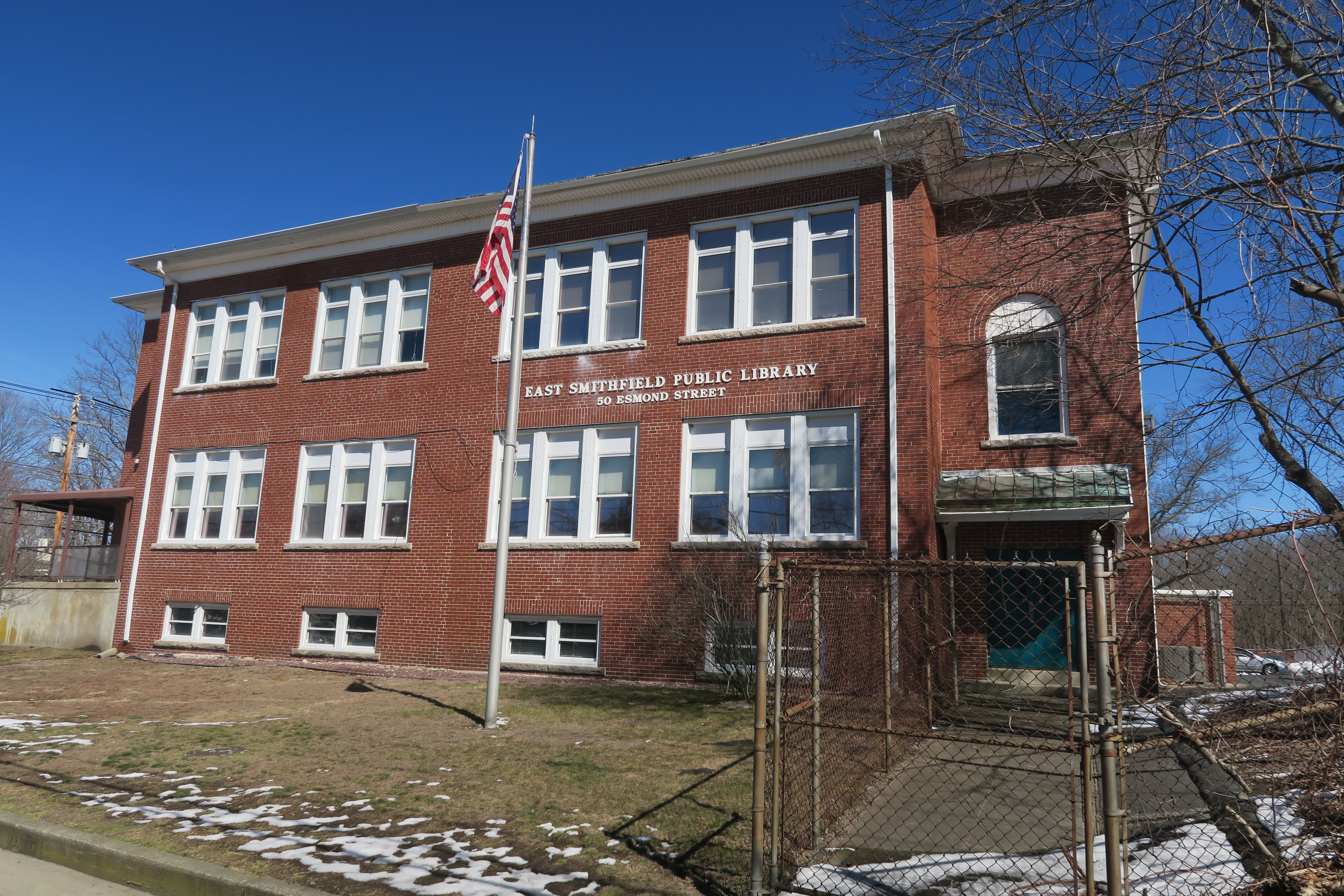
- 41.8742°N 71.5045°W
- Location: Smithfield, Rhode Island, United States of America
- Type: Public Library
- Established: 1869

Collection
- Size: 69,118

Access and use
- Population served: 20,613

Other information
- Director: Patrick Lyons
- Website: myespl.org

The East Smithfield Public Library is a public library in the village of Esmond, Rhode Island in the town of Smithfield.

== Services ==
Library services include:

- Books, audio books, DVDs, CDs, magazines, passes to Providence Children's Museum and Roger Williams Park Zoo, puzzles, games, and other materials,
- Online information services and databases, such as Live Homework Help RI, the online World Book Encyclopedia, and a multitude of online research guides and databases, WorldBook Discover, Ebscohost through http://www.askri.org/
- Download-able audio books and e-books through Ocean State Libraries E-Zone and Inter-Library Loan
- Public computers with Internet access, and WiFi
- Copy Machine, Fax, Laminating, Conference room, and Display cases
- Programming for children, young adults, and adults including Summer Reading Programs for Teens and Children and Storytimes

== History ==
The current-day East Smithfield Public Library began as two separate libraries: The Bernon Library and the Esmond Library. Both libraries were originally established by local manufacturing companies, a reflection of Smithfield's industrial past.

East Smithfield Public Library today The Bernon Library was founded in the village of Georgiaville in 1872 by the Bernon Manufacturing Company. It closed after about ten years, but was reopened in 1903 through the cooperation of interested citizens and the Manville-Jenckes Company. It eventually moved to the gallery of a former Baptist Church, and in 1919 it moved again to a refurbished grocery store.

The Esmond Library was established in 1916, when Esmond Mills contributed space and funding for a library. Esmond Mills closed in 1946 due to labor troubles, and the library closed along with it. Numerous books were destroyed when water pipes burst in the abandoned building. The Rhode Island–based conglomerate Textron eventually acquired the building, and after considerable time and effort the Smithfield Recreational Association persuaded Textron to deed the building to the town for recreational purposes. The Smithfield Recreational Association rejuvenated the library, and Elodie Blackmore was appointed librarian in 1954. She catalogued and prepared approximately 2,500 books for circulation. Today, the library's collection totals approximately 70,000 books.

The East Smithfield Public Library was born in 1967, when the boards of the Bernon and Esmond libraries decided to consolidate. Bernon Library was designated as a reading center, and one librarian managed both buildings. Sadly, in 1973, budget cuts forced the decision to close the Bernon reading center and transfer its collection to the East Smithfield Public Library.

In 1982, the library was asked to submit a proposal to the Town Council on the feasibility of renovating and utilizing part of the former Dorothy T.P. Dame School as a possible solution to the overcrowding that came as a result of combining both libraries. The Board of Trustees and library staff jumped at the opportunity to secure almost three times more operating space. The Town Council granted the use of the first floor to the library in August 1982, and finally, in 1985, after a tremendous volunteer effort by the entire Smithfield community, the contents of the library were moved to its present location at 50 Esmond Street.

During the past 25 years – with help from the Champlin Foundations and the Town of Smithfield – the library has renovated the second floor to provide much needed space for a computer area, media room and storage space, conference room, administration offices, and technical services work area. The library continues to thrive and serve the greater Smithfield community with services and resources for all ages.

== See also ==
- Greenville Public Library (Rhode Island)
- List of libraries in Rhode Island
