= Greenville, Rhode Island =

Census-designated place in Rhode Island, United States

- Census-designated place
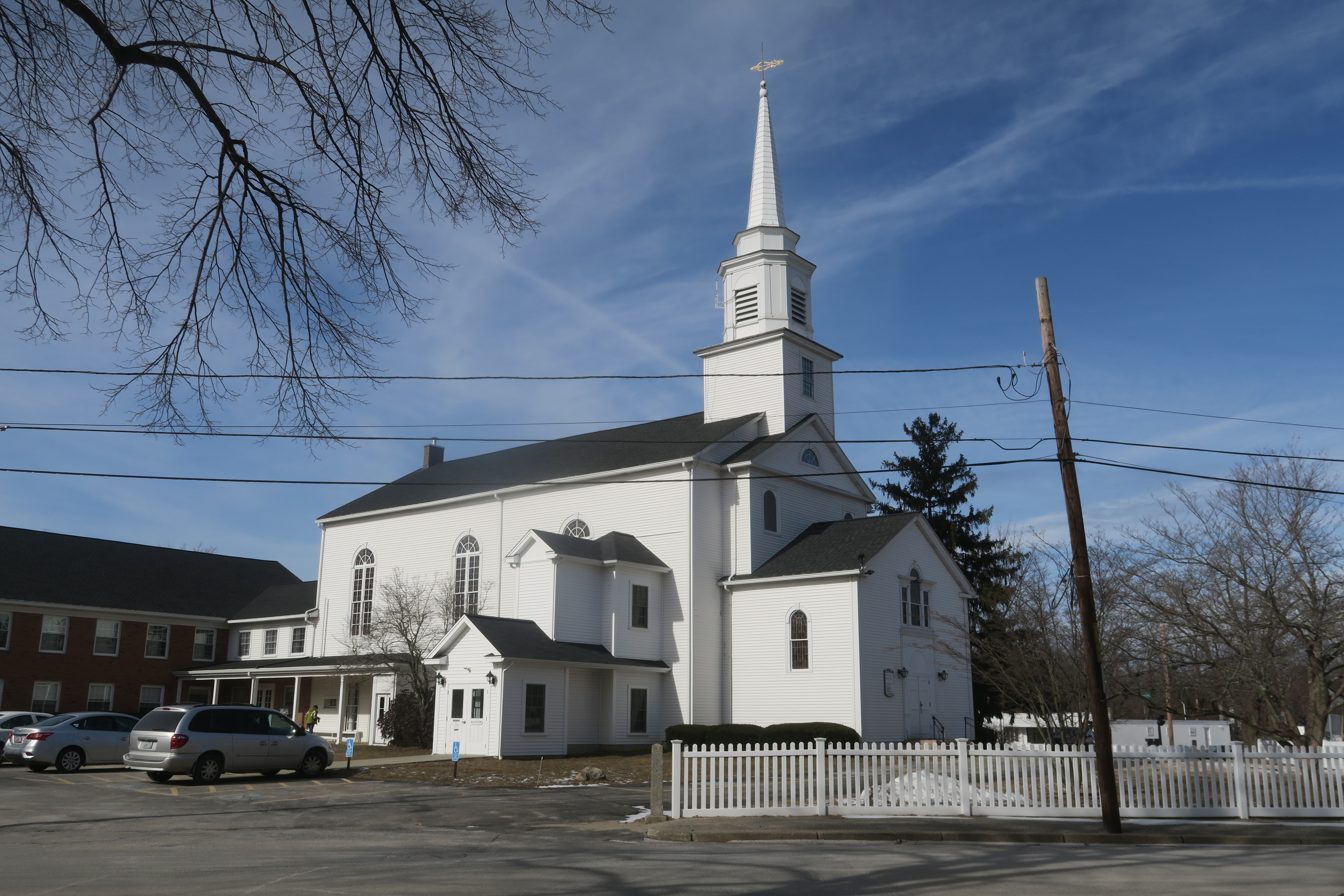
- Greenville Baptist Church

- Location in Providence County and the state of Rhode Island.
- Coordinates: 41°52′36″N 71°33′12″W
- Country: United States
- State: Rhode Island
- County: Providence

Area
  - Total: 6.13 sq mi (15.88 km^{2})
  - Land: 5.56 sq mi (14.40 km^{2})
  - Water: 0.57 sq mi (1.48 km^{2})
- Elevation: 285 ft (87 m)

Population (2020)
  - Total: 9,061
  - Density: 1,630.2/sq mi (629.42/km^{2})
- Time zone: UTC−5 (Eastern (EST))
  - Summer (DST): UTC−4 (EDT)
- ZIP Code: 02828
- Area code: 401
- FIPS code: 44-31600
- GNIS feature ID: 1218665

Greenville Bank

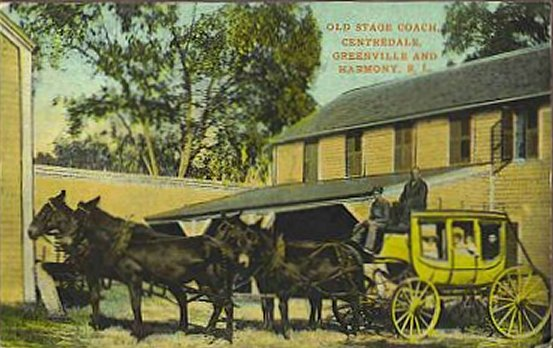
Stagecoach on Putnam Pike around the start of the 20th century outside Greenville Tavern

Greenville is a village and census-designated place (CDP) in the town of Smithfield, Rhode Island, United States. As of the 2020 census, Greenville had a population of 9,061. The CDP is centered on the village of Greenville but also encompasses the nearby villages of West Greenville and Spragueville, as well as the Mountaindale Reservoir and beach.

The village of Greenville is named after Revolutionary War general Nathanael Greene, who was born in Rhode Island in 1742. The location, however, was first settled in the 17th century. The village contains the Greenville Baptist Church (American Baptist Churches, USA), Greenville Public Library, and William Winsor School, and there are many apple orchards in the surrounding area. The area was active in the Free Will Baptist movement in the 19th century, and the Smithville Seminary, a Free Baptist institution, was nearby. U.S. Route 44, known locally as "Putnam Pike", runs through the center of Greenville.

== Geography ==
Greenville is located at 41°52′36″N 71°33′12″W (41.876749, −71.553375).

According to the United States Census Bureau, the CDP has a total area of 14.9 km^{2} (5.8 sq mi), of which 13.5 km^{2} (5.2 sq mi) is land and 1.4 km^{2} (0.54 sq mi) (9.39%) is water. Bodies of water in Greenville include Waterman Reservoir and Slack's Pond.

=== Distinct villages in Greenville CDP ===
- Greenville
- West Greenville
- Spragueville
- Mountaindale (also Mountain Dale)—the location of Mountaindale Beach. Mountaindale was home to the Mountain Dale Hosiery Mill owned by J.P. and J.G. Ray.

=== Climate ===
Climate data for Greenville, Rhode Island
Month	Jan	Feb	Mar	Apr	May	Jun	Jul	Aug	Sep	Oct	Nov	Dec	Year
Mean daily maximum °F (°C)	35.7 (2.1)	37.6 (3.1)	45.2 (7.3)	58.1 (14.5)	68.9 (20.5)	77.2 (25.1)	86.4 (30.2)	79.9 (26.6)	72.6 (22.6)	63.7 (17.6)	51.1 (10.6)	38.4 (3.6)	59.2 (15.1)
Mean daily minimum °F (°C)	18.6 (−7.4)	19.3 (−7.1)	26.9 (−2.8)	36.4 (2.4)	45.5 (7.5)	54.6 (12.6)	60.7 (15.9)	58.8 (14.9)	51.6 (10.9)	42.2 (5.7)	33.3 (0.7)	21.9 (−5.6)	39.1 (3.9)
Average precipitation inches (mm)	3.2 (81)	3.4 (86)	3.7 (94)	3.9 (99)	3.6 (91)	3.4 (86)	3.4 (86)	4.2 (110)	4.0 (100)	3.7 (94)	5.4 (140)	4.3 (110)	46.2 (1,170)
Source: Weatherbase

== Demographics ==
Historical population
Census	Pop.	Note	%±
2020	9,061		—
U.S. Decennial Census

=== 2020 census ===
The 2020 United States census counted 9,061 people, 3,370 households, and 2,326 families in Greenville. The population density was 1,630.3 people per square mile (629.5 people/km^{2}). There were 3,489 housing units at an average density of 627.7 units per square mile (242.4 units/km^{2}). The racial makeup was 92.78% (8,407) white or European American (91.84% non-Hispanic white), 0.73% (66) black or African-American, 0.24% (22) Native American or Alaska Native, 1.63% (148) Asian, 0.0% (0) Pacific Islander or Native Hawaiian, 1.49% (135) from other races, and 3.12% (283) from two or more races. Hispanic or Latino of any race was 3.33% (302) of the population.

Of the 3,370 households, 28.8% had children under the age of 18; 55.0% were married couples living together; 26.4% had a female householder with no spouse or partner present. Of households, 25.7% consisted of individuals and 15.3% had someone living alone who was 65 years of age or older. The average household size was 2.4 and the average family size was 3.0. The percent of those with a bachelor's degree or higher was estimated to be 30.1% of the population.

Of the population, 17.3% was under the age of 18, 7.3% from 18 to 24, 18.7% from 25 to 44, 29.0% from 45 to 64, and 27.7% who were 65 years of age or older. The median age was 50.6 years. For every 100 females, the population had 118.8 males. For every 100 females ages 18 and older, there were 123.1 males.

The 2016–2020 five-year American Community Survey estimates show that the median household income was $90,048 (with a margin of error of +/- $5,682) and the median family income was $105,227 (+/- $7,813). Males had a median income of $52,063 (+/- $5,193) versus $43,971 (±$11,464) for females. The median income for those above 16 years old was $50,018 (+/- $6,118). Approximately, 1.4% of families and 2.2% of the population were below the poverty line, including 0.7% of those under the age of 18 and 5.4% of those ages 65 or over.

=== 2000 census ===
As of the census of 2000, there were 8,626 people, 3,302 households, and 2,314 families residing in the CDP. The population density was 639.3 people /km^{2} (1,656 people/mi^{2}). There were 3,418 housing units at an average density of 253.3 units /km^{2} (656 units/mi^{2}). The racial makeup of the CDP was 98.47% White, 0.28% African American, 0.20% Native American, 0.51% Asian, 0.02% Pacific Islander, 0.06% from other races, and 0.46% from two or more races. Hispanic or Latino of any race were 0.58% of the population.

There were 3,302 households, out of which 30.0% had children under the age of 18 living with them, 59.3% were married couples living together, 7.9% had a female householder with no husband present, and 29.9% were non-families. Of all households, 27.0% were made up of individuals, and 17.1% had someone living alone who was 65 years of age or older. The average household size was 2.49 and the average family size was 3.05.

In the CDP, the population was spread out, with 21.7% under the age of 18, 5.4% from 18 to 24, 25.4% from 25 to 44, 25.2% from 45 to 64, and 22.3% who were 65 years of age or older. The median age was 44 years. For every 100 females, there were 86.2 males. For every 100 females age 18 and over, there were 80.1 males.

The median income for a household in the CDP was $56,036, and the median income for a family was $66,832. Males had a median income of $49,671 versus $31,545 for females. The per capita income for the CDP was $24,770. About 1.6% of families and 3.2% of the population were below the poverty line, including 1.7% of those under age 18 and 8.1% of those age 65 or over.

== Notable sites and historic places in Greenville ==
- Saint Thomas Episcopal Church and Rectory (1852)
- Smithfield Exchange Bank (1822)
- Stephen Winsor House (1850)
- Waterman-Winsor Farm (1774)

== Notable people ==
- Arthur Steere (1865–1943), senator, businessman
- John Steere (1634–1724), early settler, farmer
- Thomas Angell, Baptist scholar at Bates College
- William Winsor (1819–1904), philanthropist, supporter of education
- Margaret Bingham Stillwell (1887–1984), bibliographer, librarian
- Bernard Hawkins, American politician

== Images ==
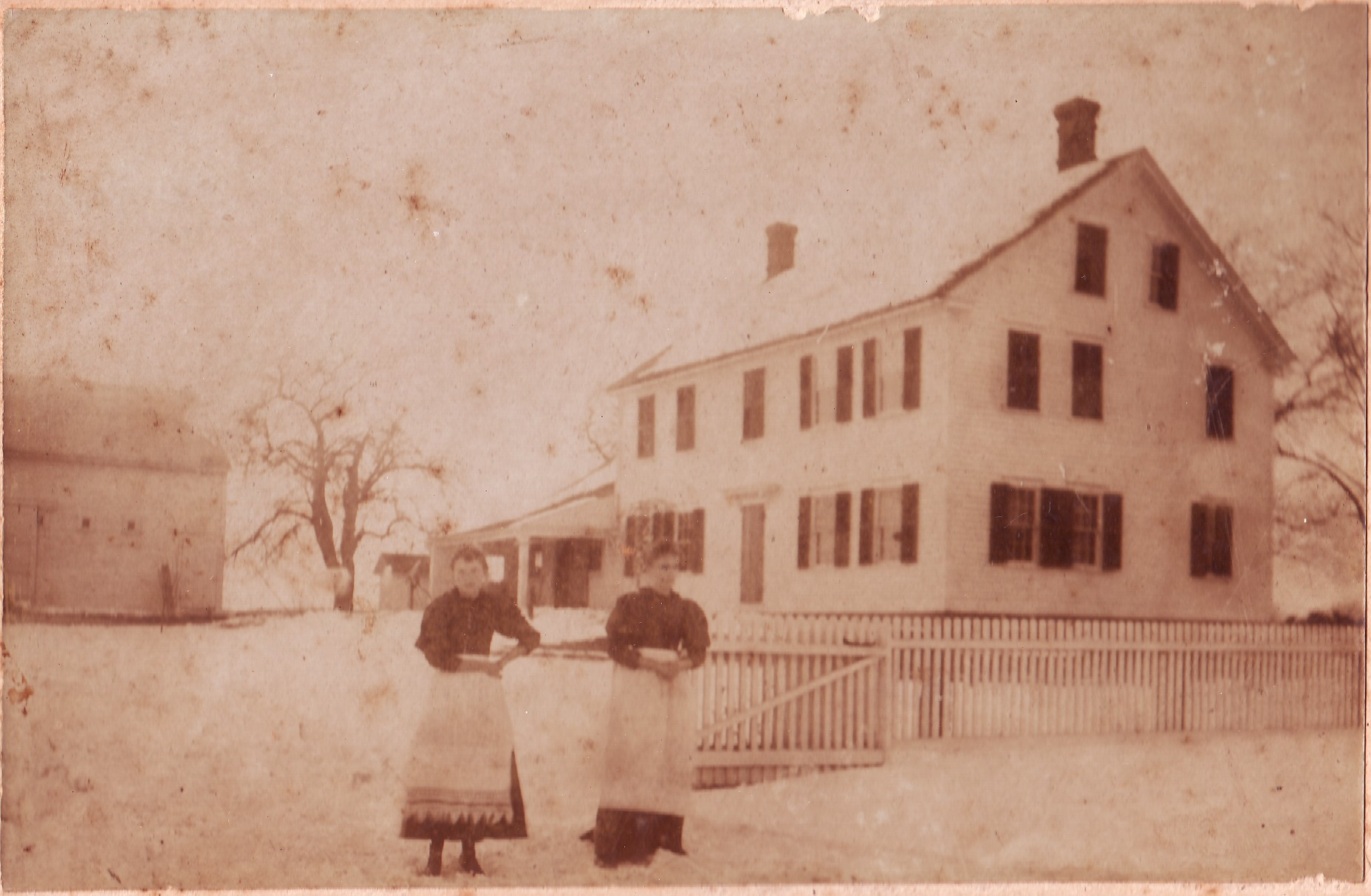
The farm of Greenville resident Arthur Steere at the start of the 20th century

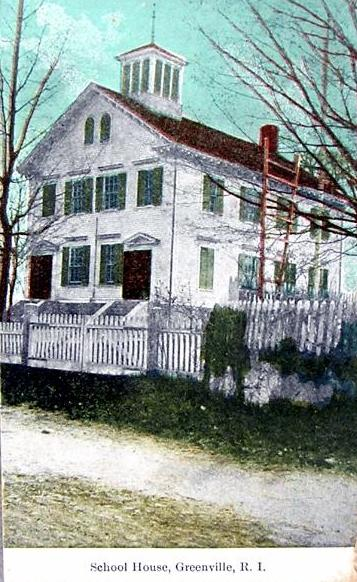
Greenville School House, formerly near the site of Greenville's post office

Greenville Finishing Company at the start of the 20th century

Slacks Pond in Greenville

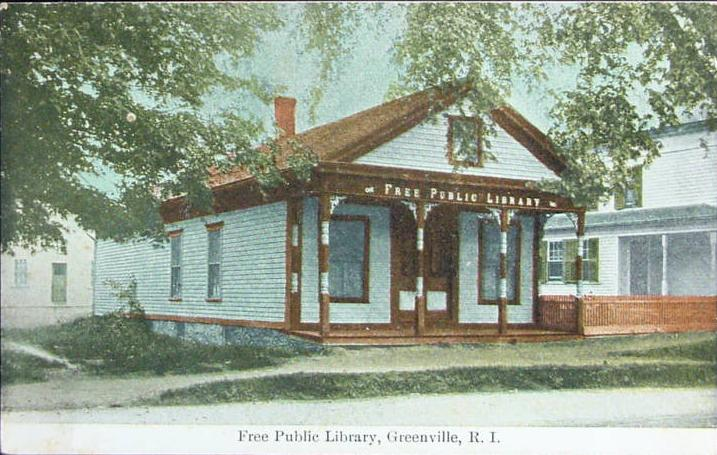
Old Greenville Public Library, originally in downtown Greenville in between the Baptist and Episcopal churches

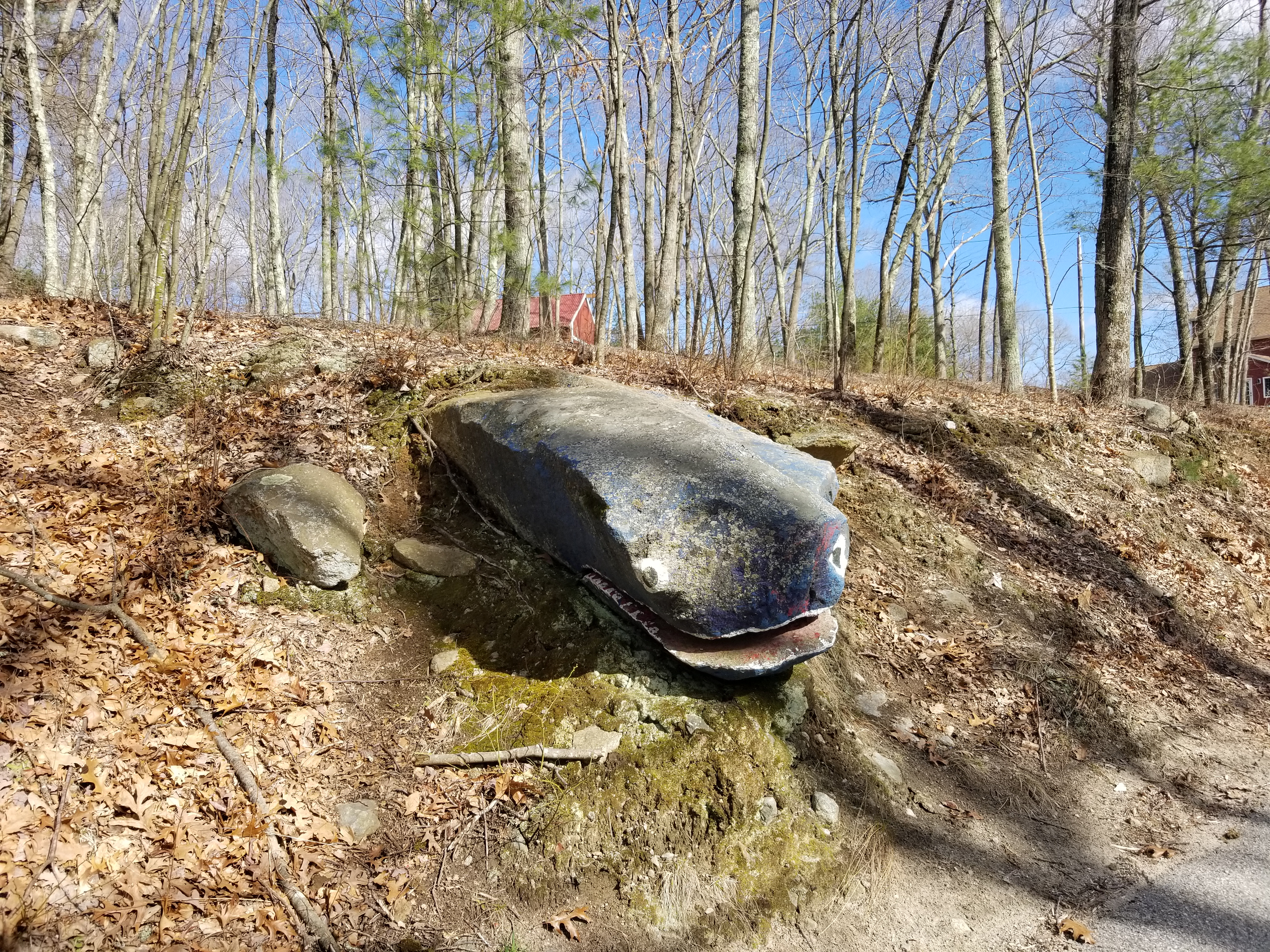
Whale Rock on Mapleville Road, a local landmark

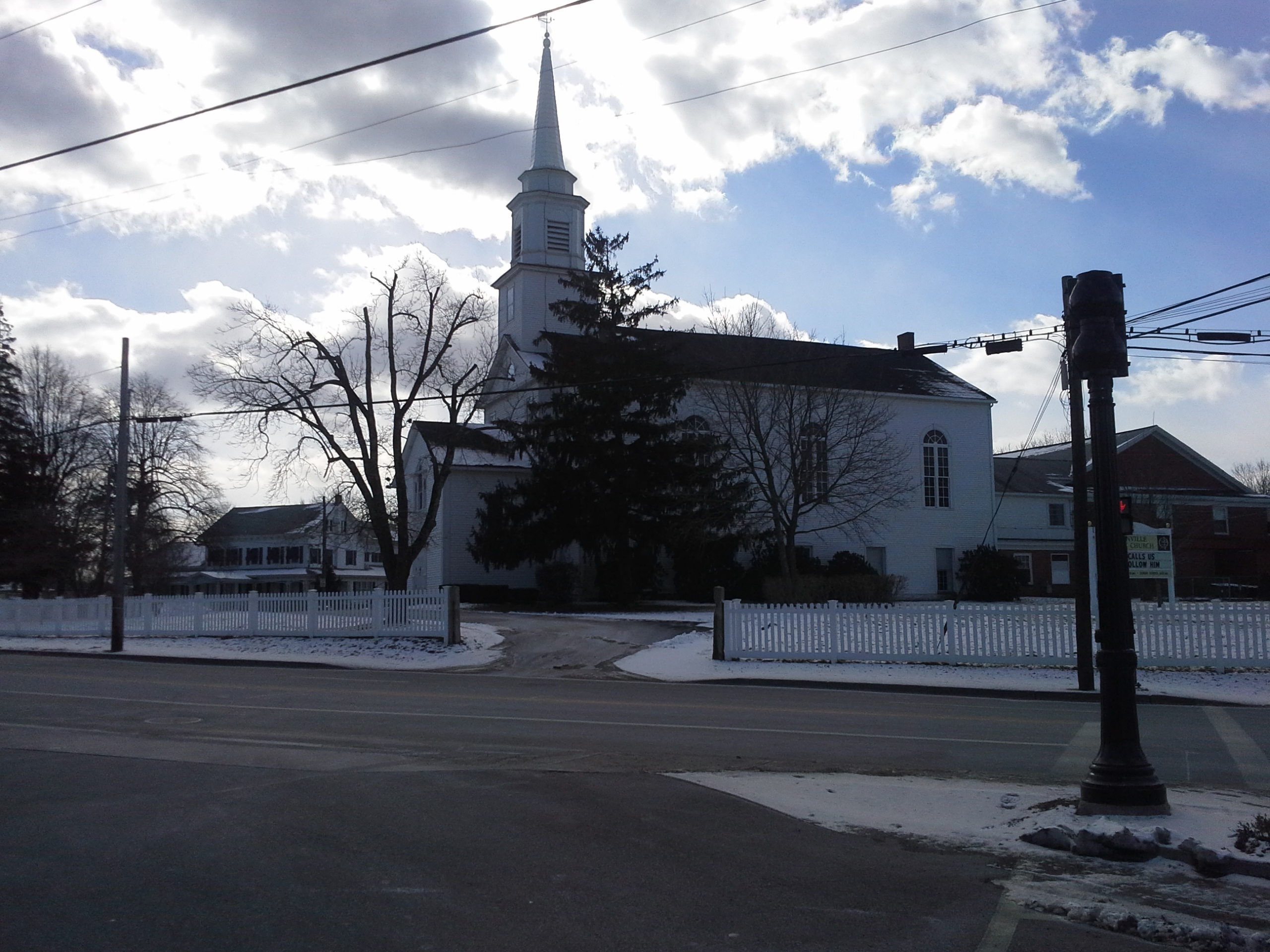
Greenville Baptist Church

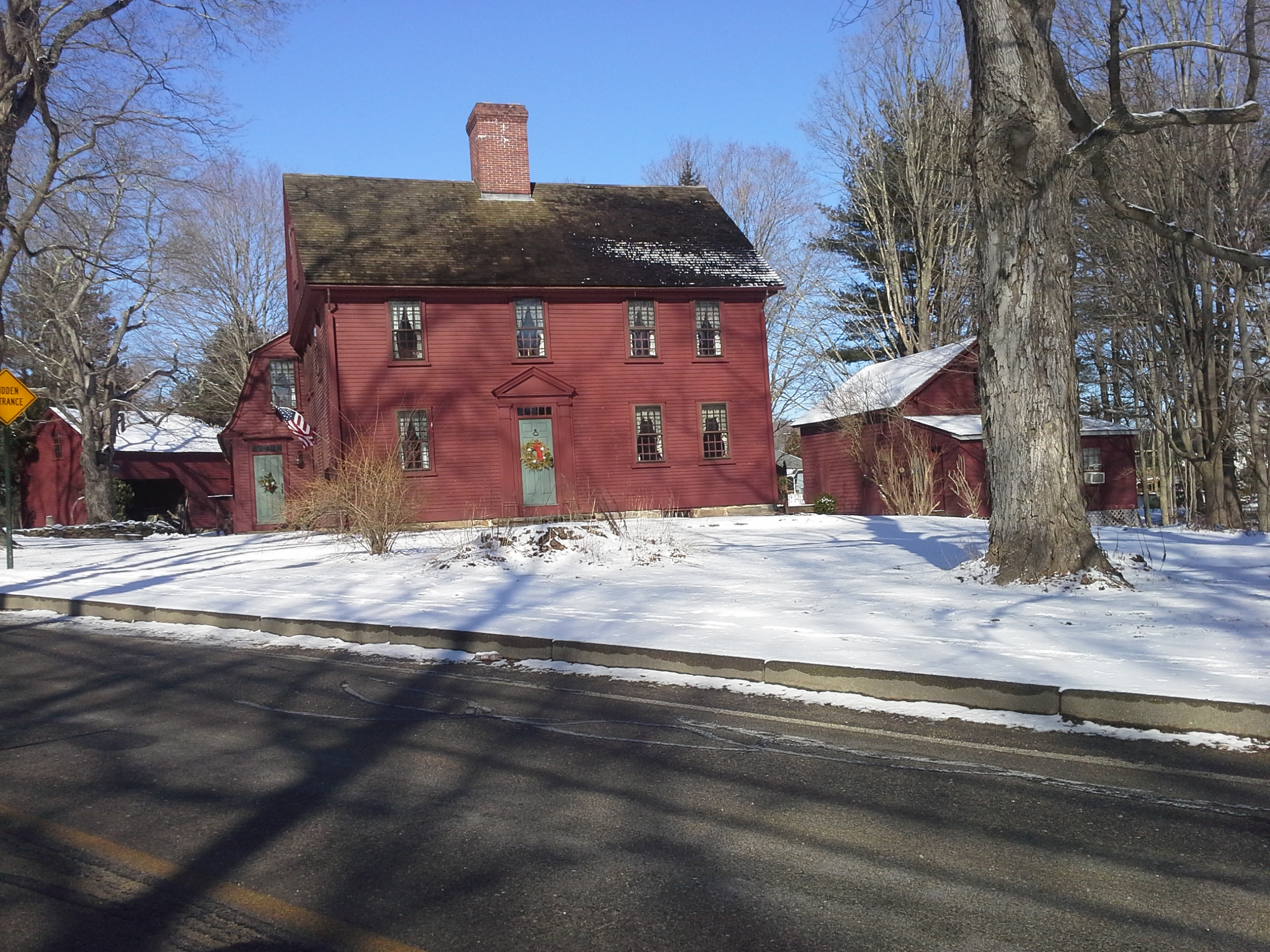
Waterman-Winsor Farm House on Austin Avenue

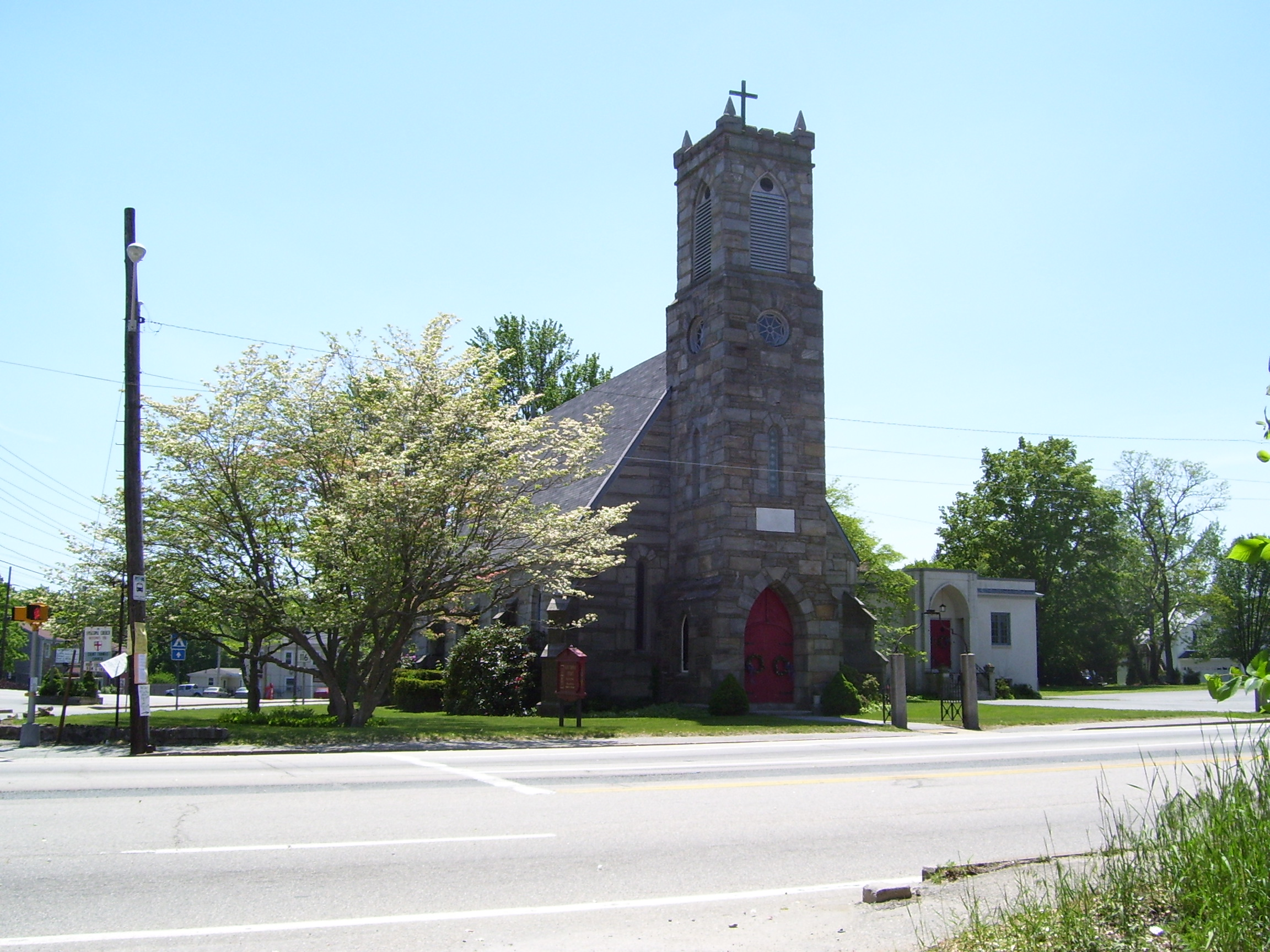
Saint Thomas Episcopal Church and Rectory
