= Waterman–Winsor Farm =

1710 house in Rhode Island, United States

- U.S. National Register of Historic Places
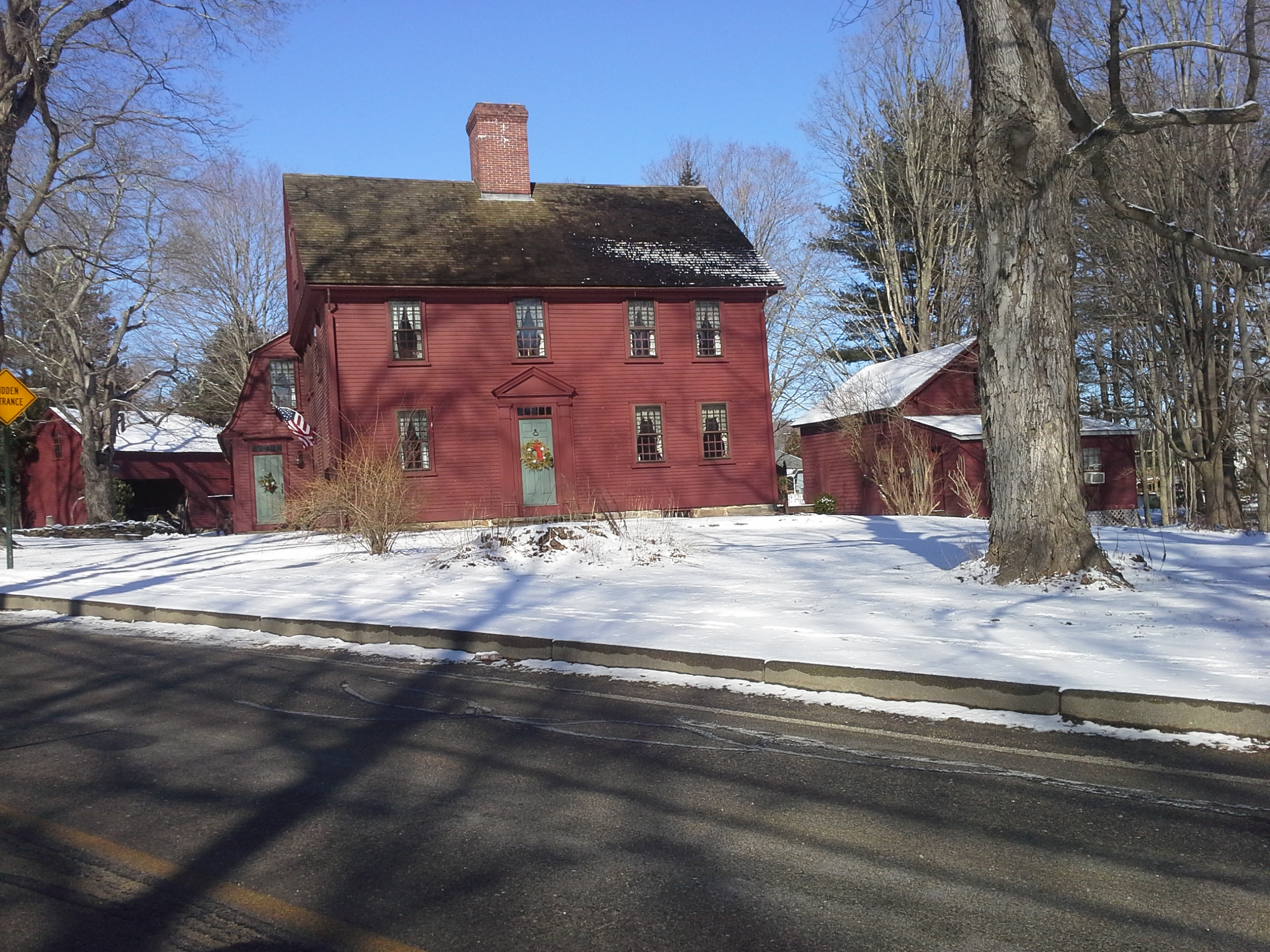

- Location within Rhode Island Location within the United States
- Location: 79 Austin Avenue, Smithfield, Rhode Island
- Coordinates: 41°52′55″N 71°33′45″W
- Built: 1710
- Architectural style: Colonial
- NRHP reference No.: 80000012
- Added to NRHP: June 27, 1980

The Waterman–Winsor Farm is a historic farmhouse located in the Greenville part of Smithfield, Rhode Island.

One of the first owners of the farm was likely Resolved Waterman (1703-1746), a grandson of Resolved Waterman (1638-1670) and Mercy Williams, a daughter of Roger Williams. Waterman acquired 600 acres of farmland surrounding this property, and he also operated a tavern nearby in the center of the village of Greenville to which the historic Smithfield Exchange Bank branch was later attached.

The Waterman–Winsor Farm House contains a main part and a rear gambrel ell, which may have been moved to the site from elsewhere. The earliest part of the house may have been constructed in the early eighteenth century as early as 1710, and it may have been the original home of "Colonel Abraham Winsor (1720-1798). The other parts of the building may have been constructed circa 1774-1780 by Capt. Andrew Waterman, Resolved Waterman's son. In the late nineteenth century, the farm was known as Maplewood Orchard because of the row of seventeen sugar maple trees which William Waterman Winsor planted during the Civil War in 1863 and which still survive today. The farm was the largest apple orchard in the state around the turn of the twentieth century under Thomas Winsor and produced apples for over 100 years into the mid-twentieth century until the surrounding land was sold for suburban developments of ranch houses. The house remained in the Waterman and Winsor families until 1975 when Stanley Winsor sold the Winsor Farm and, all that remained was 1.85 acres of the original 600 acres of land with the house and remaining outbuildings."

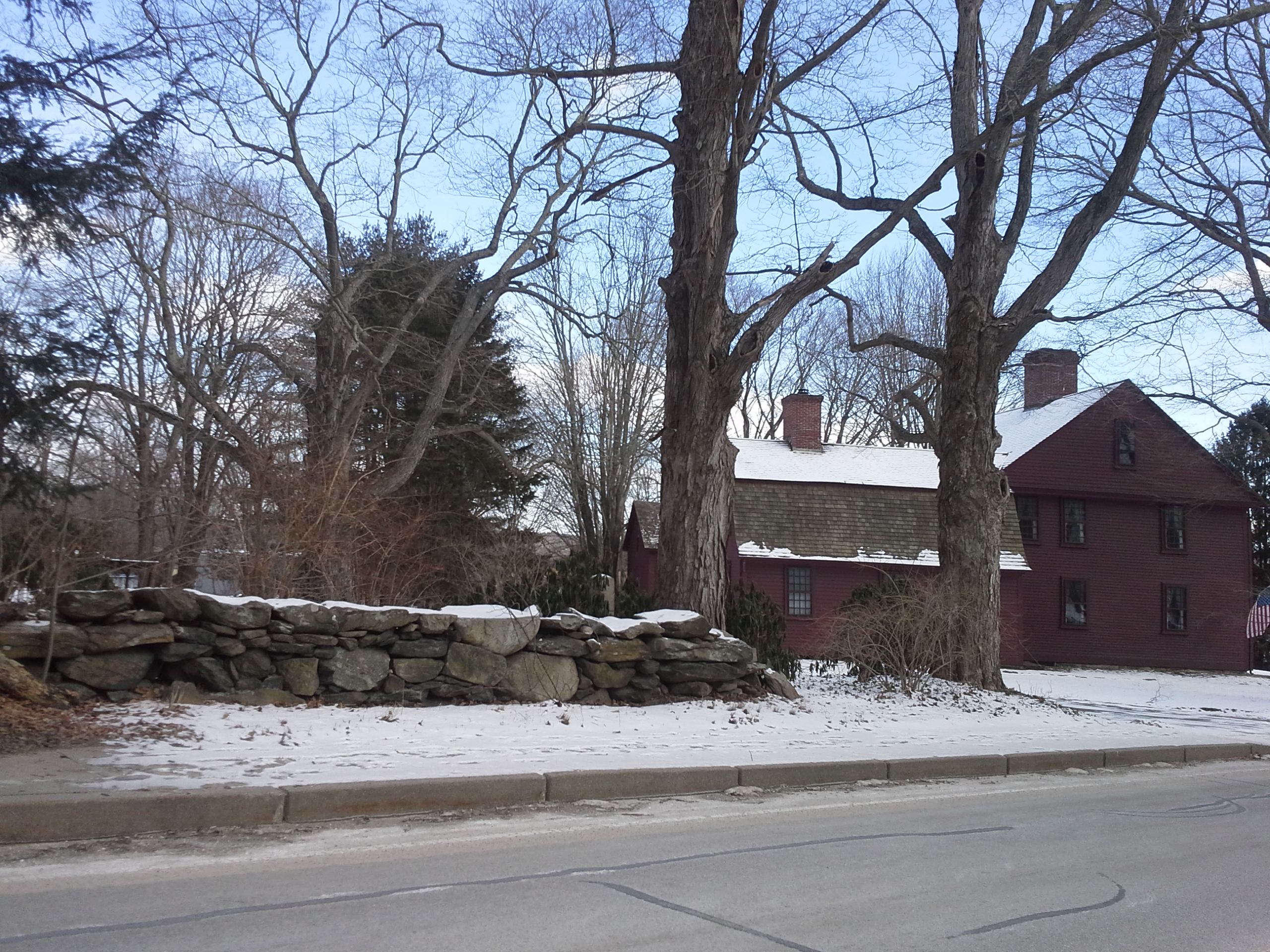
Waterman–Winsor Farm on Austin Avenue in Greenville RI Rhode Island

== See also ==
- National Register of Historic Places listings in Providence County, Rhode Island
