= Mountaindale, Rhode Island =

Locale in Smithfield, Rhode Island, U.S.

Coordinates: 41.884°N 71.534°W

Mountaindale (also known as Mountain Dale) is a locale in the town of Smithfield, Rhode Island, United States. The area is currently included in the Greenville, Rhode Island census-designated place and is sometimes referred to as part of Spragueville.

Mountaindale is one of the named villages of Smithfield. Mountaindale was home to the Mountain Dale Hosiery Mill owned by J.P. and J.G. Ray.

It is currently a named place in Rhode Island.

It is named in a political graveyard reference source.

Mountaindale Beach is located in Mountaindale.
