= Georgiaville, Rhode Island =

- Georgiaville Historic District
- U.S. National Register of Historic Places
- U.S. Historic district
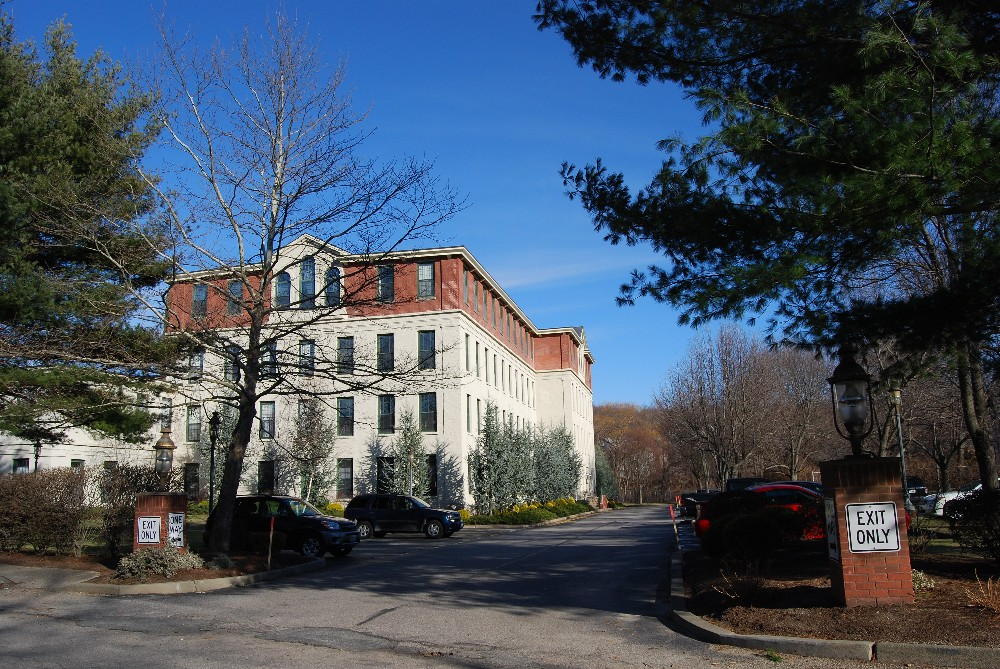
- Georgiaville Mill

- Location within Rhode Island Location within the United States
- Location: Smithfield, Rhode Island
- Nearest city: Providence, Rhode Island
- Coordinates: 41°53′13″N 71°30′30″W
- Architectural style: Federal, Victorian
- NRHP reference No.: 85002734
- Added to NRHP: October 3, 1985

Georgiaville is a village in Smithfield, Rhode Island, United States. The village was named after the Georgia Cotton Manufacturing Company mill located in the area. The Georgiaville Pond Beach is located in the village and is a popular recreation spot. In the 1920s the Ku Klux Klan was active in the area, and Klan rallies were held in Georgiaville. The village, which has retained many features of its origin as a mid-19th century mill village, including the mill complex and several blocks of mill worker housing, was added to the National Register of Historic Places in 1985. Georgiaville is also where Smithfield's town hall is located.

== See also ==
- National Register of Historic Places listings in Providence County, Rhode Island
