= Stephen Winsor House =

Historic house in Rhode Island, United States

- U.S. National Register of Historic Places
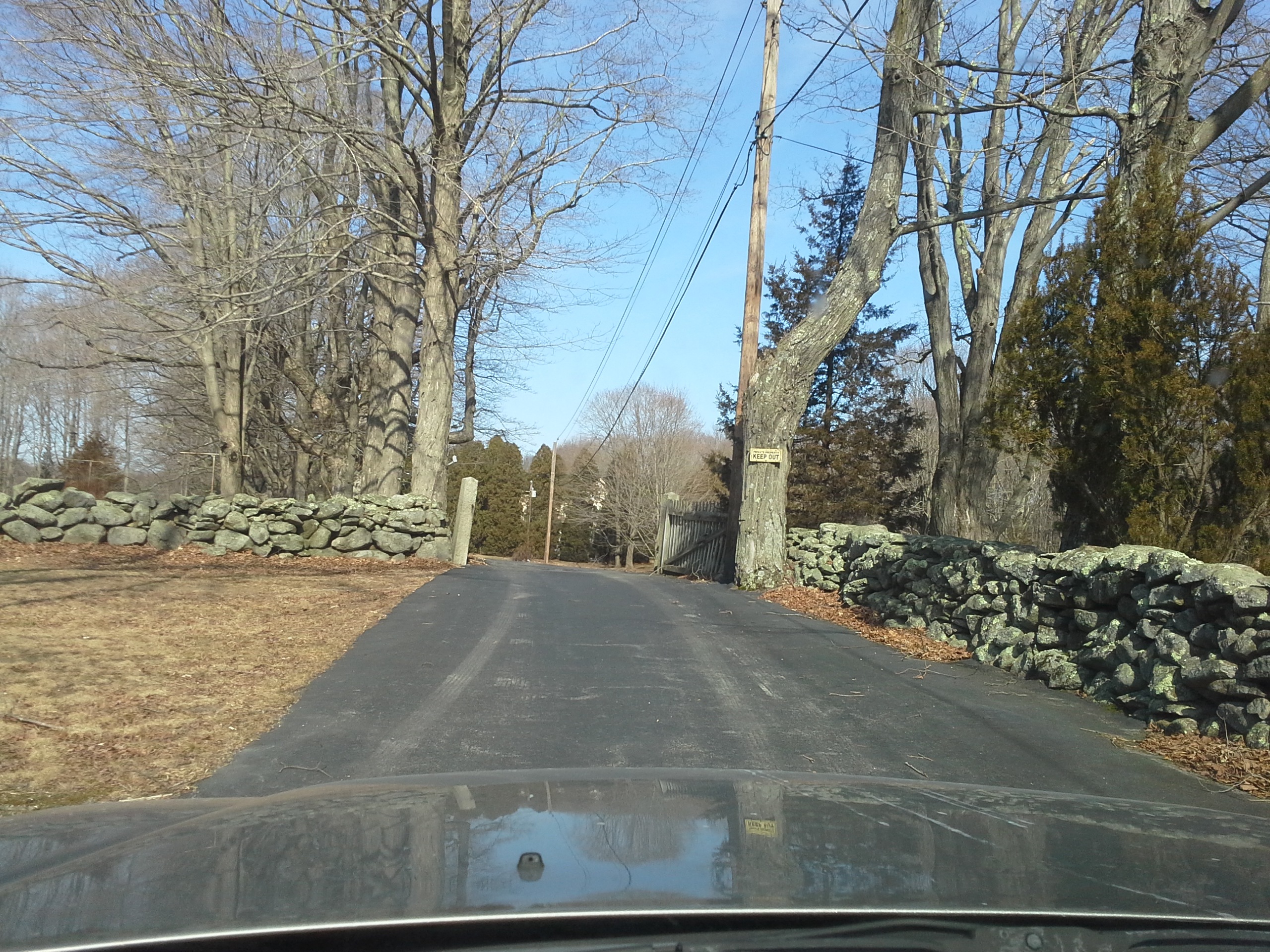
- driveway to the Stephen Winsor House located off Austin Avenue in Greenville, no trespassing allowed to view the house

- Location within Rhode Island Location within the United States
- Nearest city: 113 Austin Avenue, Smithfield, Rhode Island
- Coordinates: 41°53′8″N 71°33′55″W
- Area: 10.9 acres (4.4 ha)
- Built: 1710
- Architectural style: Italian Villa
- NRHP reference No.: 75000004
- Added to NRHP: October 6, 1975

The Stephen Winsor House is a historic house in Smithfield, Rhode Island, United States. The 2 1/2-story wood-frame house was built c. 1710 by Stephen Winsor, whose family had long lived in the Smithfield area and owned extensive lands there. The house is a high-quality and well-preserved example of Italianate styling, with corner pilasters, deep bracketed eaves, and pointed-arch windows in the gables. The house remained in the Winsor family until c. 1970; it is set on a handsomely landscaped property (apparently also a long-standing feature), down a winding driveway on the north side of Austin Avenue.

The property was listed on the National Register of Historic Places in 1975.

== See also ==
- National Register of Historic Places listings in Providence County, Rhode Island
