= John Steere =

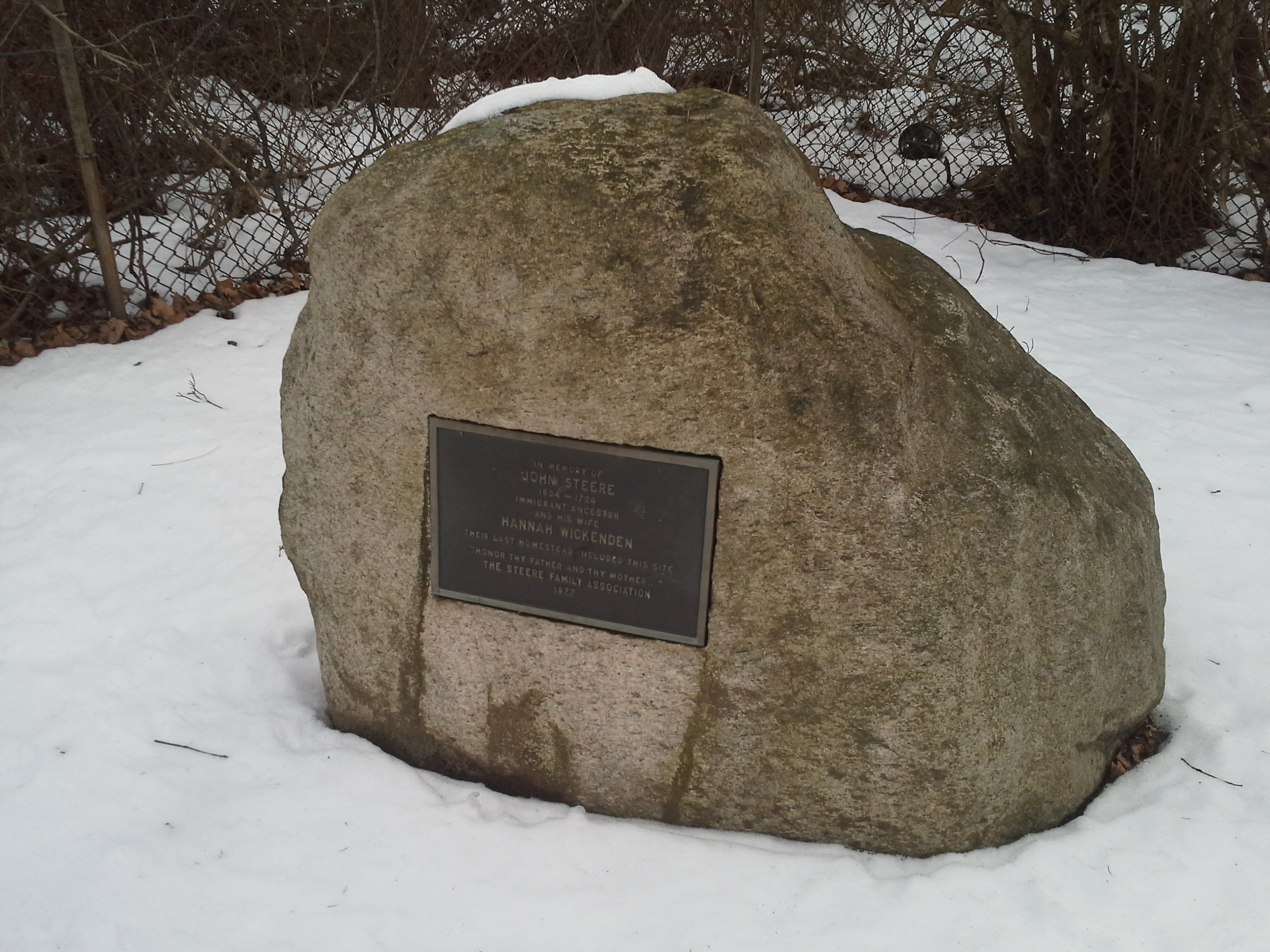
John Steere and Hannah Wickenden Steere Memorial

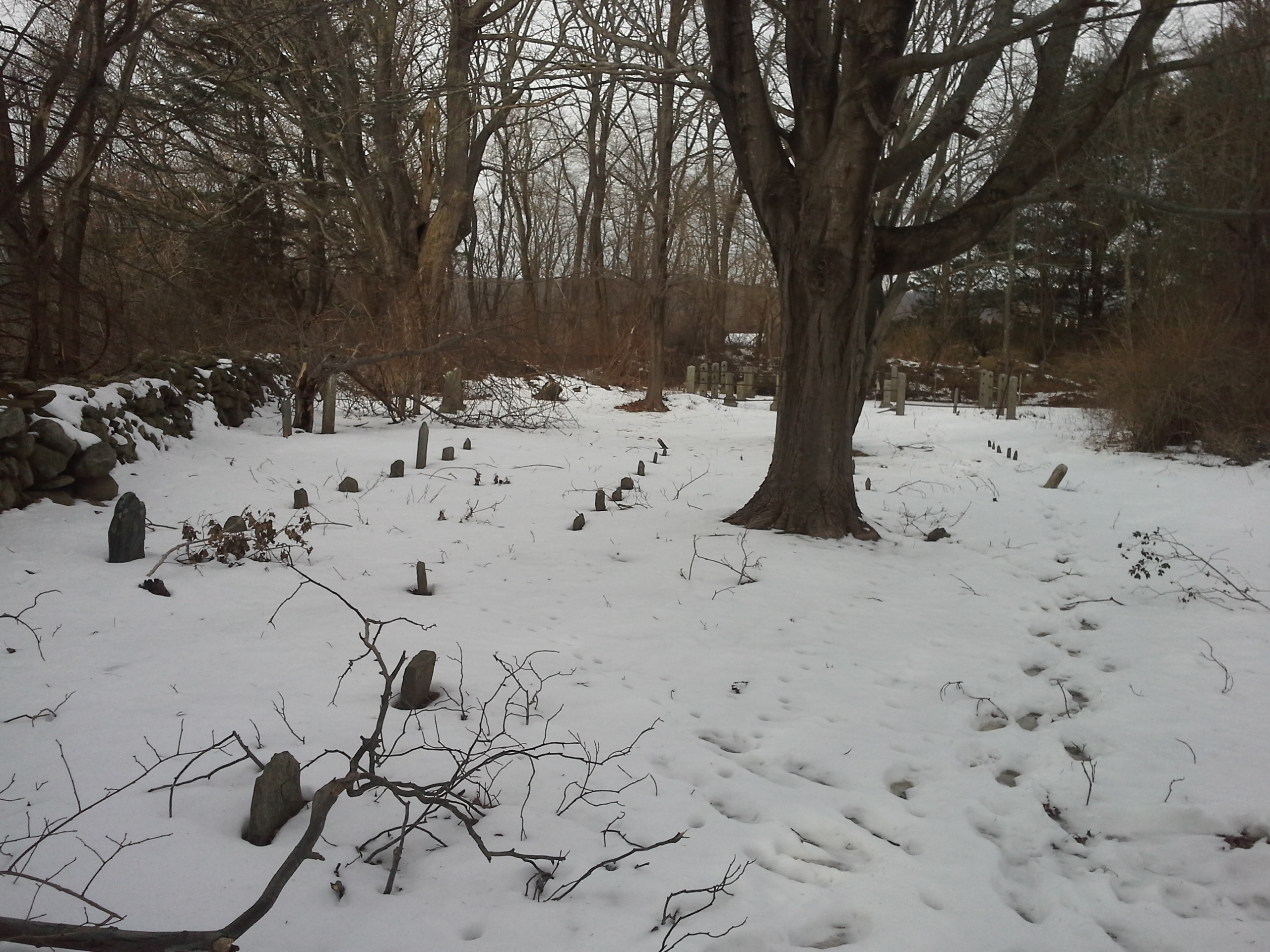
Cemetery on John Steere's Original Homestead land in Smithfield near the junction of Mann School House and Swan Roads

John Steere (ca. 1634 – 1724) was one of the earliest settlers of the state of Rhode Island, a town official, and a founder of the town of Smithfield, Rhode Island.

Coat of Arms of John Steere

John Steere was purportedly born in Ockley, Dorking, Surrey in England around April 6, 1634. Steere likely emigrated to New England in the late 1650s and on May 9, 1660 he was granted his first recorded land on the west side of the Moshassuck River in Providence and later acquired various other parcels of land. In 1660 he married Hannah Wickenden, daughter of Rev. William Wickenden, pastor of the First Baptist Church in America in Providence, and the Steeres were likely members of the Baptist church. In 1663 Steere served as town sergeant of Providence. Around 1663-67 Steere was one of the first settlers to move to Wayunkeke (Weecapasacheck) in western Smithfield, Rhode Island near Glocester, Rhode Island, and in 1666 Steere is recorded as a witness of the Inman Purchase in northern Rhode Island, which was acquired from the Indian, Quashaamit. John Steere helped divide the purchase with Edward Inman and John Mowry. During King Phillips War in 1675-76 Steere and his family moved back to Providence, living near Cowpen Point. Eventually, in 1686/87 the Steeres returned to Wionkhiege Hill in Smithfield when his son-in-law Peter Place and daughter Sarah settled in the area. Steere was purportedly one of the first to plant apple orchards in the area and was a prominent farmer and many of his descendants followed in the apple farming tradition. In 1704 Steere leased a piece of land "unto an Indian known by the name of Sam Noforce who hath for sum years lived by mee and hath well behaved him selfe towards mee and mine." Steere died in Smithfield on August 27, 1724 and left his mansion house to his youngest son Samuel.

The John Steere Family Association was founded in 1930 and meets each summer in Rhode Island for annual family reunions of the descendants of John Steere.

== See also ==
- Smithfield, Rhode Island
- Arthur Steere
- Henry J. Steere
