= Saint Thomas Episcopal Church and Rectory =

Historic church in Rhode Island, United States

- U.S. National Register of Historic Places
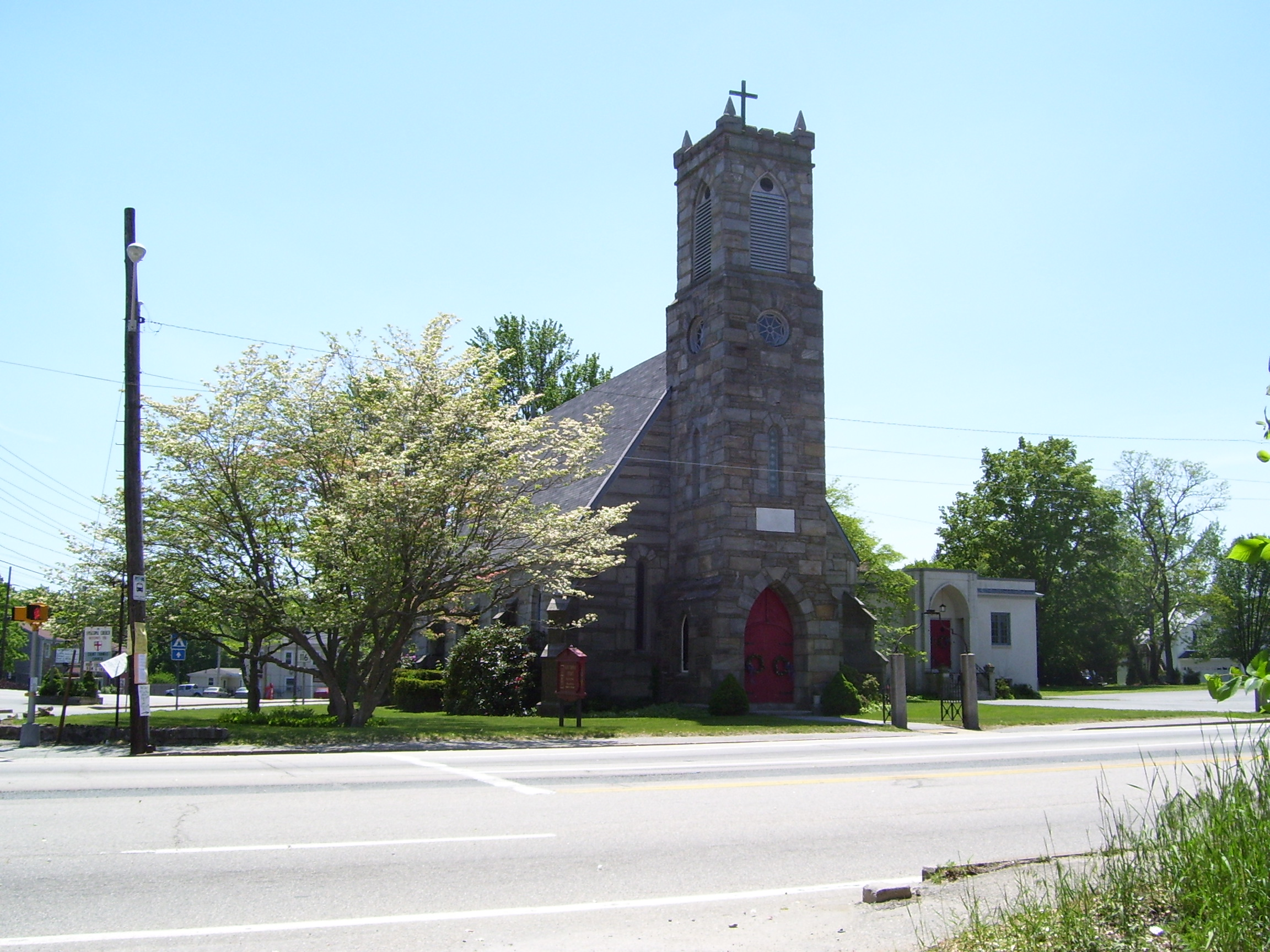
- Church in 2008

- Location within Rhode Island Location within the United States
- Location: Smithfield, Rhode Island
- Coordinates: 41°52′16″N 71°33′12″W
- Built: 1851
- Architect: Thomas A. Tefft
- Architectural style: Queen Anne, Gothic Revival
- NRHP reference No.: 87000993
- Added to NRHP: July 2, 1987

Saint Thomas Episcopal Church is an Episcopal church located at 1 Smith Avenue (the junction of United States Route 44 and Rhode Island Route 116) in the village of Greenville in Smithfield, Rhode Island. The church reported 442 members in 2015 and 429 members in 2023; no membership statistics were reported nationally in 2024 parochial reports. Plate and pledge income reported for the congregation in 2024 was $124,865. Average Sunday attendance (ASA) in 2024 was 60 persons.

== History ==
The present church, a Gothic Revival stone structure, was designed by a prominent local architect, Thomas Alexander Tefft, and built in 1851 on land donated to the new congregation by Resolved Waterman, a Greenville native and prominent businessman. The congregation was established as an offshoot of St. Stephen's Church in Providence, which was attended by Waterman and whose officiant, the Rev. James Eames, was Saint Thomas' first minister. It is one of a small number of surviving designs by Tefft, who designed as many as 25 Rhode Island churches in his career. The rectory, a modest vernacular Queen Anne structure, was built in 1889. The property was listed on the National Register of Historic Places in 1987.

The current minister is the Rev. Dante A. Tavolaro .

== See also ==
- National Register of Historic Places listings in Providence County, Rhode Island
