= Smithfield Exchange Bank =

- U.S. National Register of Historic Places
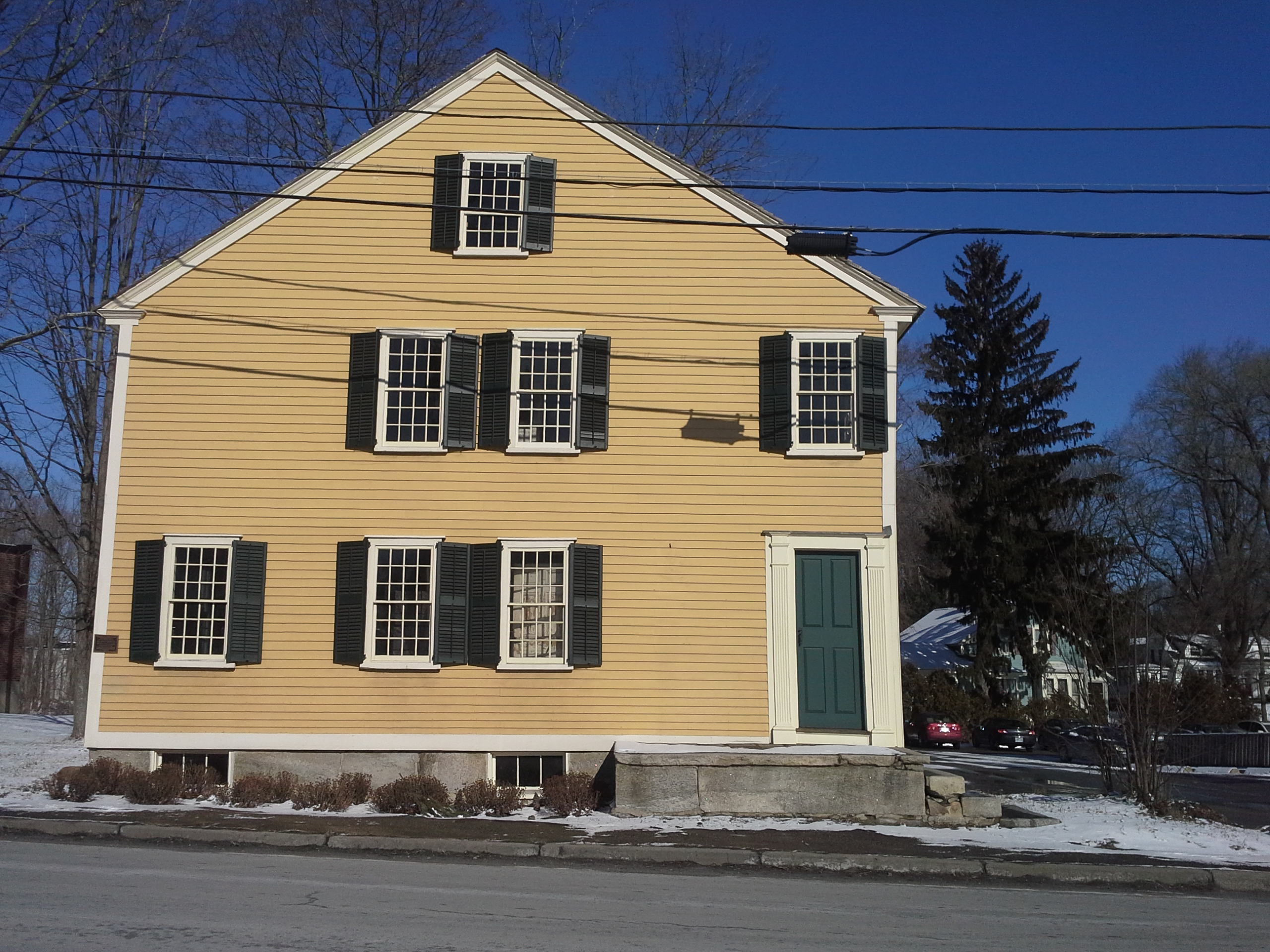
- Smithfield Exchange Bank in 2013

- Location within Rhode Island Location within the United States
- Location: Smithfield, Rhode Island
- Coordinates: 41°52′26″N 71°33′12″W
- Area: less than one acre
- Built: 1822
- Architectural style: Federal
- NRHP reference No.: 06000295
- Added to NRHP: April 19, 2006

The Smithfield Exchange Bank (also known as the Resolved Waterman Tavern or Greenville Tavern), built in 1822, is located on Putnam Pike in the Greenville area of Smithfield, Rhode Island.

== History ==
In 1733, Resolved Waterman Jr., a great-grandson of Roger Williams built a tavern to attract business from travelers on this former turnpike road. In 1822 a new owner constructed the present building, the Smithfield Exchange Bank, as an ell attached onto the back of the main tavern building. Another western ell was built onto the tavern, and the two were connected by a cobblestone courtyard. The 1822 bank incorporators were Daniel Winsor (president), Asa Winsor, Stephen Steere, Elisha Steere, Richard Smith, Silas Smith, Nathan B. Sprague, Joseph Mathewson, Dexter Irons, John S. Appleby, and Reuben Mowry. The bank originally provided services to farmers and small businesses throughout northwestern Rhode Island. In 1845 William Winsor became cashier of the institution.

In 1856 the Exchange Bank moved next door to a larger brick building. The tavern became a private residence in 1902. The main section of the Waterman Tavern was demolished in 1936 for the construction of U.S. Route 44, and the ells were altered to stand alone. The former bank ell served as a residence until 1969 for Mrs. Bessie Fish. Other owners included the Evans, Mowry, Whipple, and McLaughlin families, and Cumberland Farms. From 1969 to 2008 the building became greatly dilapidated. In 2000 Cumberland Farms sold the building to the town of Smithfield, and in 2006 it was sold to the Smithfield Preservation Society. The building was added to the National Register of Historic Places in 2006.

== Restoration ==
As of 2009, the Smithfield Preservation Society has been fundraising and attempting to restore the tavern, despite an earlier attempt by the town of Smithfield to condemn and demolish the building because it is perceived as an eyesore by some neighbors.

== Images ==
Resolved Waterman Tavern ca. 1900. The front part of the tavern is demolished and only one back ell survives today

Greenville Tavern ca. 1900. The front part of the tavern is demolished and only one back ell survives today

The "new" brick Smithfield Exchange Bank, built in 1856, adjacent to the original wooden structure. Shown at the turn of the twentieth century.

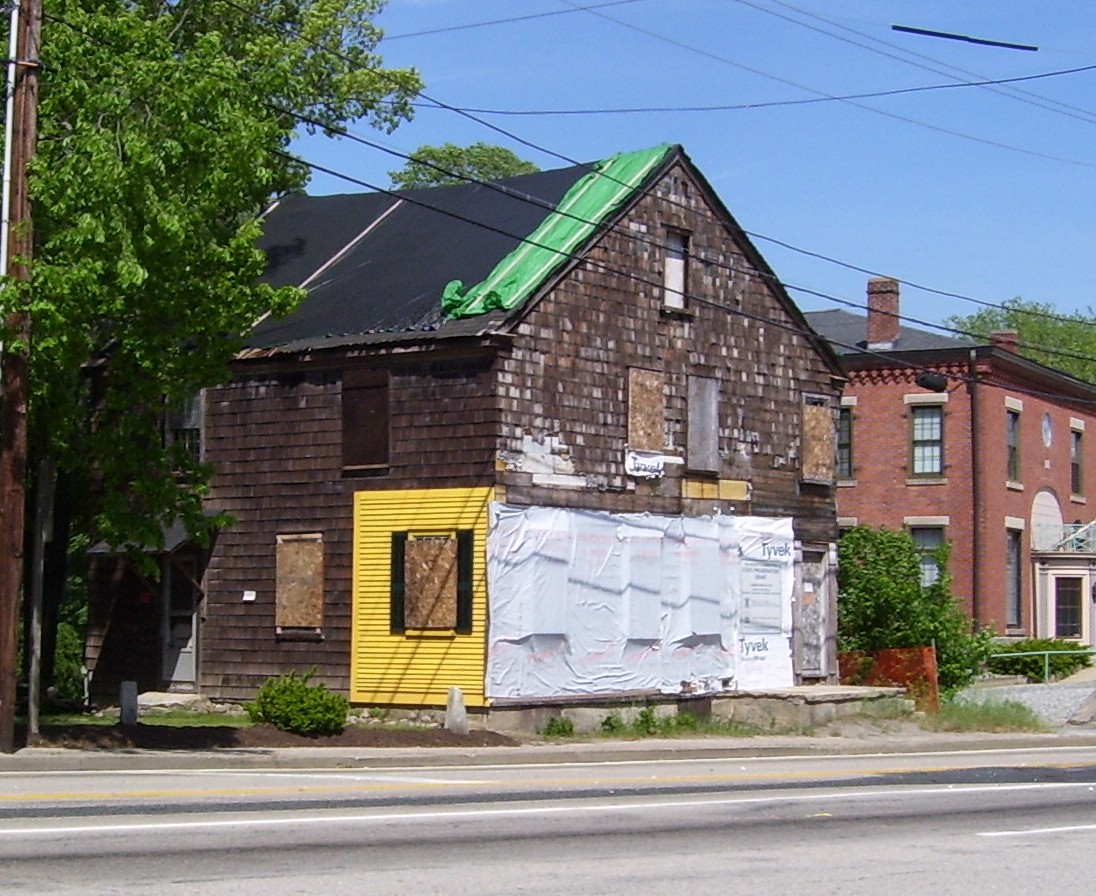
Smithfield Exchange Bank in 2008 (before renovations) with the newer brick bank building in the background

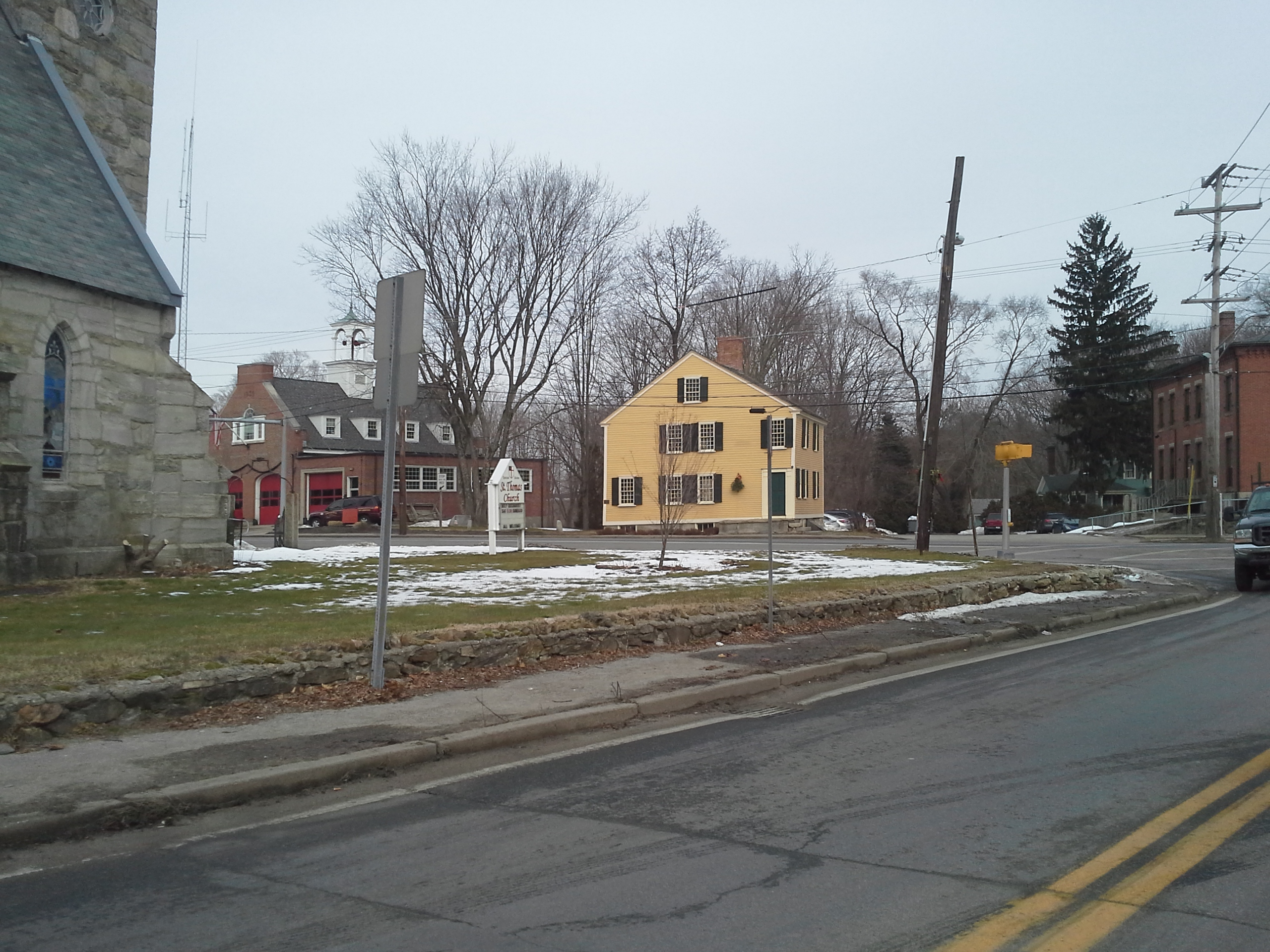
Exchange Bank in 2013

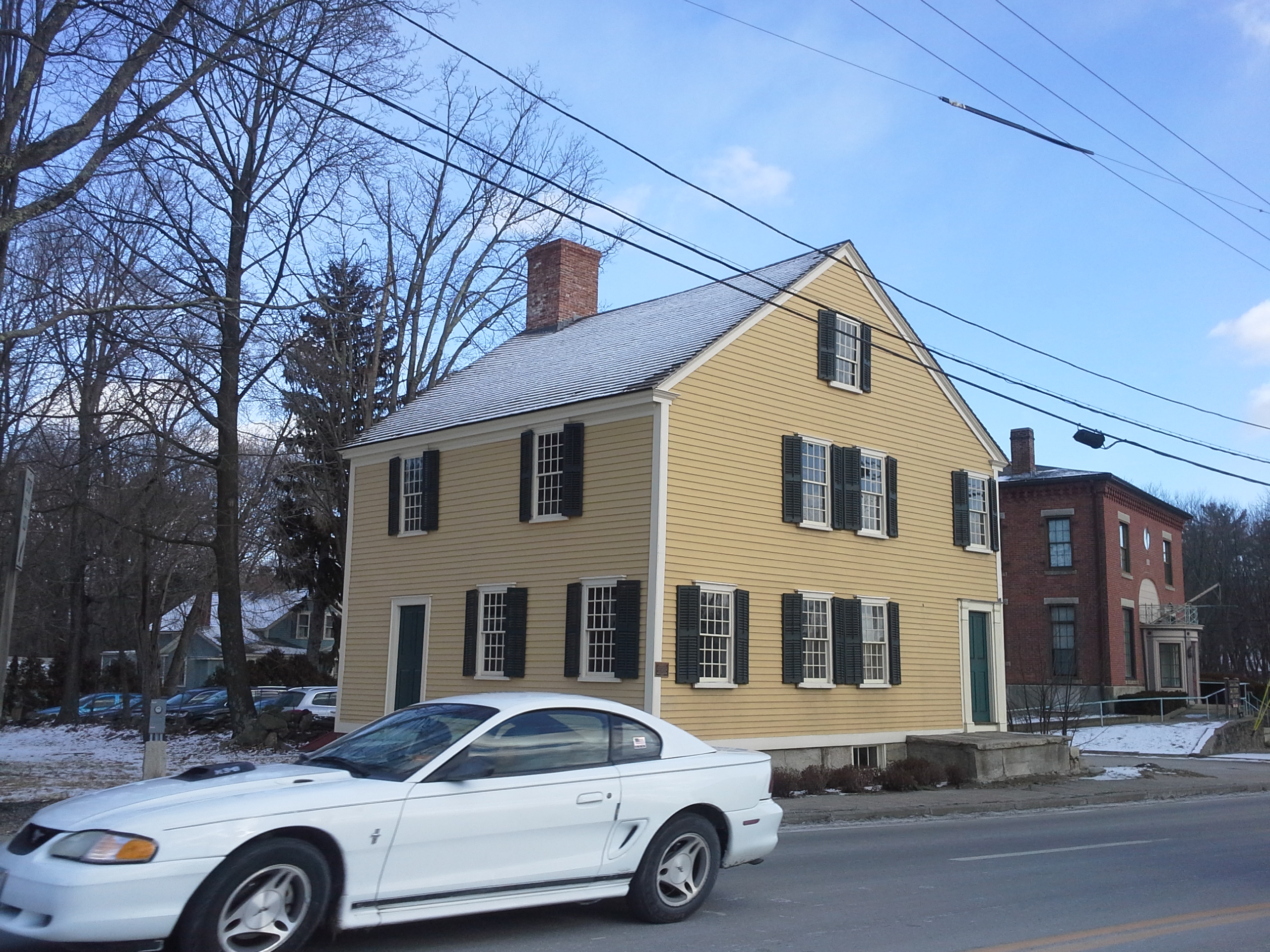
Smithfield Exchange Bank in Greenville Rhode Island RI USA in 2013

== See also ==
- National Register of Historic Places listings in Providence County, Rhode Island
