= Smithfield, Rhode Island =

- Town
- Flag Seal Logo

- Location in Providence County and the state of Rhode Island.
- Coordinates: 41°55′18″N 71°32′58″W
- Country: United States
- State: Rhode Island
- County: Providence
- Incorporated: 1731
- Named for: John Smith (miller)

Government
  - Type: Council-manager
  - Town Council: John J. Tassoni Jr. (D); Angelica L. Bovis (D); Thomas Winfield (D); Michael P. Iannotti (R); Rachel S. Toppi (R)
  - Town Manager: Robert W. Seltzer

Area
  - Total: 27.8 sq mi (71.9 km^{2})
  - Land: 26.6 sq mi (68.9 km^{2})
  - Water: 1.2 sq mi (3.1 km^{2})
- Elevation: 367 ft (112 m)

Population (2020)
  - Total: 22,118
  - Density: 810/sq mi (311/km^{2})
- Time zone: UTC−5 (Eastern (EST))
  - Summer (DST): UTC−4 (EDT)
- ZIP Codes: 02828, 02917, 02814
- Area code: 401
- FIPS code: 44-66200
- GNIS feature ID: 1219817
- Website: https://www.smithfieldri.gov/

Smithfield is a town in Providence County, Rhode Island, United States. The population was 22,118 at the 2020 census. Incorporated in 1731, it includes the historic villages of Esmond, Georgiaville, Mountaindale, Spragueville, Stillwater, and Greenville. Smithfield is home to Bryant University, a private, four-year university.

== History ==
Greenville Bank at the turn of the twentieth century

The area comprising modern-day Smithfield was first settled in 1663 as a farming community by several British colonists, including John Steere. The area was originally within the boundaries of Providence until it was incorporated as a separate municipality by the General Assembly in February 1731. The first town meeting was held on March 17, 1731 at the home of Captain Richard Whitman located in modern-day Lincoln. Richard Sayles was elected as the first town clerk. John Arnold, Captain Joseph Mowry, Thomas Steere, John Mowry, Sam Aldrich and Benjamin Smith were elected as the first members of the town council. According to the town's official website, Smithfield was named after John Smith, a first settler of Providence, who was granted land by Roger Williams and was one of the original party of six men that formed original settlement of Providence Plantations.

Chief Justice Peleg Arnold lived in early Smithfield, and his 1690 home still stands today. Through the early 18th century, Smithfield was home to an active Quaker community that extended along Great Road, from what is today Woonsocket, north into Uxbridge, Massachusetts. This Quaker community became influential in the abolition movement, with members such as Effingham Capron and Abby Kelley Foster, and also gave rise to other Quaker settlements including one at Adams, Massachusetts, where Susan B. Anthony was born as an early member. Elizabeth Buffum Chace, an abolitionist and figure in the women's rights movement, was born in Smithfield.

During the Industrial Revolution, Smithfield transformed from an agrarian community to a manufacturing center, with several textiles mills being founded along the Woonasquatucket River. By 1819, there were nine cotton mills in Smithfield. To alleviate difficulties with the mills' water supplies, the Woonasquatucket River Company was granted a charter to construct three reservoirs in town: Slack Reservoir, Upper and Lower Sprague Reservoir, and Waterman Reservoir. With a stable supply of water, by 1876, the number of mills in Smithfield increased to 20.

As early as 1833, movements had begun to advocate for splitting Smithfield into multiple municipalities. In 1871, the towns of North Smithfield and Lincoln were granted charters by the General Assembly to become separate municipalities, and the city of Central Falls later split from Lincoln in 1895. The colonial ghost town of Hanton City is located within the boundaries of present-day Smithfield.

In 1943, a U.S. Army Air Corps Lockheed RB-34 crashed on Wolf Hill, killing all three servicemen aboard.

== Geography ==
According to the United States Census Bureau, the town has a total area of 71.9 km^{2} (27.8 sq mi), of which 68.9 km^{2} (26.6 sq mi) is land and 3.1 km^{2} (1.2 sq mi) is water. The total area is 4.25% water.

== Demographics ==
Historical population
Census	Pop.	Note	%±
1790	3,171		—
1800	3,120		−1.6%
1810	3,828		22.7%
1820	4,678		22.2%
1830	6,857		46.6%
1840	9,534		39.0%
1850	11,500		20.6%
1860	13,283		15.5%
1870	2,605		−80.4%
1880	3,085		18.4%
1890	2,500		−19.0%
1900	2,107		−15.7%
1910	2,739		30.0%
1920	3,199		16.8%
1930	3,967		24.0%
1940	4,611		16.2%
1950	6,690		45.1%
1960	9,442		41.1%
1970	13,468		42.6%
1980	16,886		25.4%
1990	19,163		13.5%
2000	20,613		7.6%
2010	21,430		4.0%
2020	22,118		3.2%
U.S. Decennial Census

As of the 2020 United States Census, Smithfield has 22,118 residents and 7,797 households in the town. The population density was 832 inhabitants per square mile (321/km^{2}). The racial makeup as of 2020 was 84.77% White, 1.25% African Americans, 0.24% Native American, 7.51% Asian, 1.89% from other races and 4.33% of two or more races. Hispanic and Latino of any race made up 3.73% of the population.

There were 7,797 households, out of which 24.9% had children under the age of 18 living with them, 55.4% were married couples living together, 24.6% had a female householder with no spouse present and 12.9% had a male householder with no spouse present. 11.3% of all households were made up of individuals, and 4.7% had someone living alone who was 65 years of age or older. The average household size was 2.34 people and the average family size was 2.97.

In the town, the population was spread out, with 16.4% of the population under the age of 18, 18.1% from 18-24, 17.7% from 25 to 44, 26.6% from 45 to 64, and 21.3% who were 65 years of age or older. The median age was 43.7 years.

The median income for a household in the town was $101,653, and the median income for a family was $133,639. The per capita income for the town was $45,943. About 4.2% of the population live below the poverty line, including 0.5% of those under age 18 and 6.3% of those age 65 or over.

== Education ==
Smithfield contains three public elementary schools (Pleasant View, Raymond LaPerche, and Old County Road School), a middle school (Vincent J. Gallagher Middle School) and a public high school, Smithfield High School which was ranked 17th out of 52 high schools in Rhode Island in 2006. St. Phillip's School, a private Roman Catholic academy offering education in grades K–8, is situated in Greenville. Mater Ecclesiae College, a Catholic college, was also located in the town in a facility that was formerly the St. Aloysius Orphanage until the college closed in 2015. Partnered with Saint Raphael Academy in Pawtucket, the private Catholic boarding school Overbrook Academy currently resides those same facilities for middle school, high school, and summer camp programs.

=== Bryant University ===
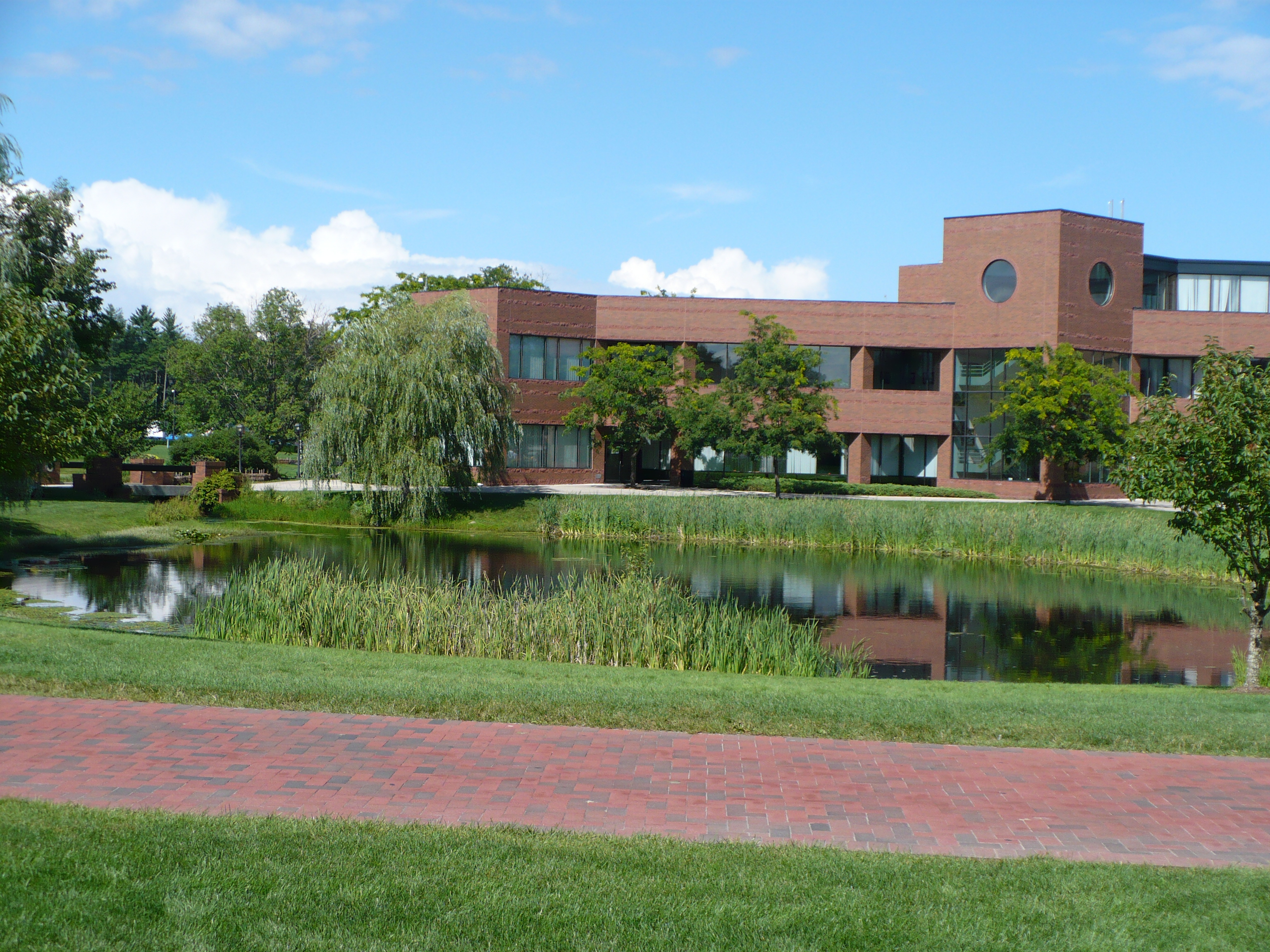
Bryant University's campus

Bryant University, a private university with programs in business and the arts and sciences, is located in Smithfield.

In 1971, the university moved to its current campus in Smithfield when the founder of Tupperware, Earl Silas Tupper, a Bryant alumnus, donated the current 428 acres (1.73 km^{2}) of land to be the new campus. The famous Bryant Archway was also relocated. The old Emin Homestead and Captain Joseph Mowry homestead occupied much of the land that makes up the present day Smithfield campus. The land was purchased and farmed for three generations between the late 19th century and the mid-20th century. Today, many descendants of the original Emin settlers still live near the Bryant campus. The school also claims a handful of family members as alumni and offers a scholarship for accounting students as a tribute to the Emin family. Historical pictures of the Emin Homestead can still be found in the Alumni house.

== Economy ==
=== Principal employers ===
According to Smithfield's 2024 Comprehensive Annual Financial Report, the principal employers in the city are:

#	Employer	# of employees
1	Fidelity Investments	4,400
2	Bryant University	1,103
3	Town of Smithfield	500
4	Citizens Bank	400
5	Honeywell	300
6	Village at Waterman Lake	300
7	Stop & Shop	300
8	FGX International	250
9	Target Corporation	200
10	Dave's Marketplace	200

== Notable people ==
- Cyrus Aldrich (1808–1871), born in Smithfield, United States Congressman from Minnesota
- Peleg Arnold (1751–1820), delegate to the Continental Congress
- Sullivan Ballou (1829–1861), Civil War Officer and author of the Sullivan Ballou Letter
- Bob Bellemore (born 1940) – ice hockey coach
- Emeline S. Burlingame (1836–1923), editor and evangelist
- Adin B. Capron (1841–1911), United States Congressman
- Elizabeth Buffum Chace (1806–1899), activist in the Anti-Slavery, Women's Rights, and Prison Reform Movements of the mid to late 19th century
- Edward Harris, (1801–1872), manufacturer, philanthropist, and abolitionist
- Ronald K. Machtley (born 1948), United States Congressman, President of Bryant University (1996–2020)
- Daniel Mowry Jr. (1729–1806), delegate to the Continental Congress
- James W. Nuttall (born 1953), United States Army Major General, deputy director of the Army National Guard and Deputy Commander of the First Army
- Gina Raimondo (born 1971), United States Secretary of Commerce (2021–2025), 75th Governor of Rhode Island (2015–2021)
- Danny Smith (born 1959), producer, writer, and voice actor
- William Stillman Stanley Jr., politician
- Arthur Steere (1865–1943), politician, businessman
- Alexander Warner (1827–1914), businessman and politician
- David Wilkinson (1771–1852), co-builder of Slater Mill
- William Winsor, education philanthropist, namesake of the William Winsor School

== Friendship cities ==
- (Republic of Artsakh) Stepanakert, Artsakh (2023)
