= National Register of Historic Places listings in Glocester, Rhode Island =

This is a list of Registered Historic Places in Glocester, Rhode Island.

Contents: Counties in Rhode Island

Bristol | Kent | Newport | Providence (Pawtucket | Providence (city) | Woonsocket) | Washington

This National Park Service list is complete through NPS recent listings posted May 1, 2026.

	Name on the Register	Image	Date listed	Location	City or town	Description
1	Chepachet Village Historic District	Chepachet Village Historic District	March 31, 1971 (#71000031)	Both sides of U.S. Route 44 (roughly from the intersection of U.S. Route 44 and RI 102 north to the intersection of RI 100 and RI 102) and radiating 41°54′46″N 71°40′00″W	Glocester	
2	Cherry Valley Archeological Site, RI-279		November 1, 1984 (#84000358)	Address Restricted	Glocester	
3	Glocester Town Pound	Glocester Town Pound	September 22, 1970 (#70000021)	Pound Rd. and Chopmist Hill Rd. 41°53′44″N 71°40′09″W	Glocester	
4	Harmony Chapel and Cemetery	Harmony Chapel and Cemetery	June 25, 1980 (#80000098)	Putnam Pike; 41°53′20″N 71°36′03″W	Glocester	
5	Manton-Hunt-Farnum Farm	Manton-Hunt-Farnum Farm	October 3, 1985 (#85002735)	Putnam Pike; 41°53′54″N 71°37′15″W	Glocester	

== See also ==
- National Register of Historic Places listings in Providence County, Rhode Island
- List of National Historic Landmarks in Rhode Island
