= Ponaganset =

Ponaganset (also, Ponnaganset, Ponagansett or Ponnagansett), a Native American-derived name, may refer to:

- Ponaganset High School, North Scituate, Rhode Island, U.S.
- Ponaganset Reservoir, a lake in Rhode Island, U.S.
- Ponaganset River, Rhode Island, U.S.
- USS Ponaganset (AO-86, US Navy)
