= Arthur Steere =

American politician (1865–1943)

Steere as a young man

Arthur Wallace Steere (1865–1943) was a Rhode Island politician and prominent businessman and landowner.

== Biography ==
Steere (known as "A.W.") was born in Glocester, Rhode Island, on September 3, 1865, to Seth Hunt Steere and Lucy L. Smith. Steere was a direct descendant of Rhode Island founder, Roger Williams, William Wickenden, General William West, and Pilgrim George Soule. As a youth he worked on his family's farm in Glocester and then went to Scituate, Rhode Island, where he engaged in the teaming business for three years. In 1889 Steere inherited a bequest from his relative Henry J. Steere, a prominent manufacturer, upon the latter's death. In 1887, Steere married into the Brayton family when he married Sarah Jeanette Brayton (daughter of David and Phebe Brayton) in a Congregational service; she who died in 1892. Next, Steere married Mamie Farrar (daughter of Miles and Annie (Allen) Farrar) in 1894. They had five children together: Seth, Arthur, Nelson, Nettie and Henry.

Eventually, Arthur Steere became the owner of over one thousand acres (4 km^{2}) of property in the Rhode Island towns of Johnston, Burrillville, Foster, Scituate, Smithfield, and Glocester, making him one of the state's largest landowners. Steere sold hundreds of acres to the state of Rhode Island for the creation of the Scituate Reservoir in the 1920s. He owned various businesses on this land, including lumber yards, which produced railroad ties and telegraph poles, and also dairy farms, fruit orchards, refrigeration facilities, and a teaming business that first paved the majority of the roads in northern Rhode Island. Steere had over one hundred and fifty employees at the start of the 20th century. Senator Steere was a lifelong Republican, and in 1907 he was elected to the Rhode Island Senate representing Greenville, Rhode Island. As a senator, Steere was extremely active in property issues, serving on the property committee. Steere was also a member of the Freemasons of Greenville and Scituate and an attendant of Greenville's Free Will Baptist Church. After Steere died in January 1943, his sons Seth Hunt Steere and Henry J. Steere took over the bulk of his businesses and landholdings. Steere Orchards on Austin Avenue in Greenville is still owned by his descendants and is the largest orchard in Rhode Island. Steere was buried at Harmony Chapel Cemetery in Glocester.

== Images ==
Steere's birthplace on the corner of Snake Hill and Sawmill Roads in Harmony, Rhode Island

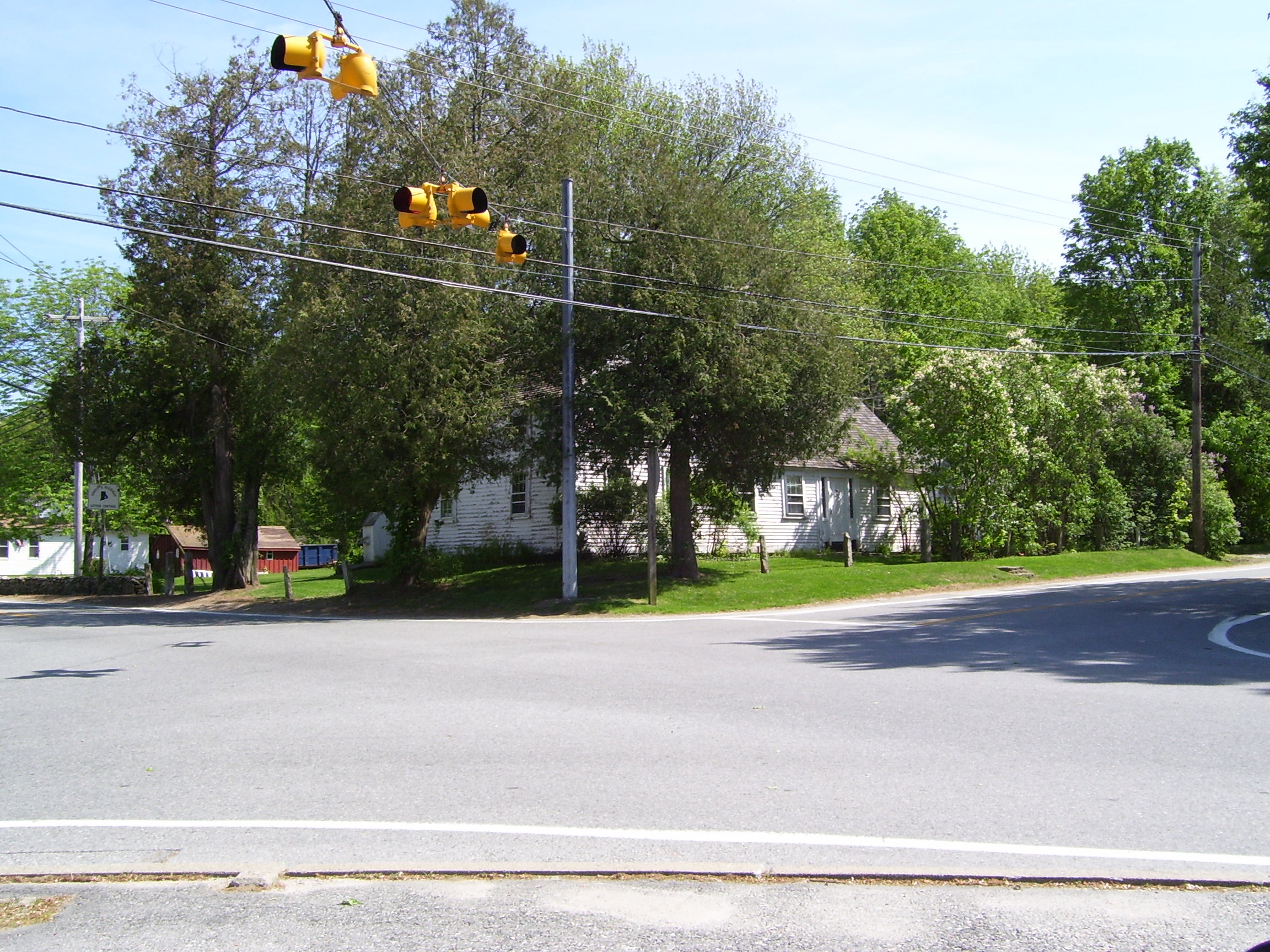
Steere's birthplace in 2008 on the corner of Snake Hill and Sawmill Roads in Harmony, Rhode Island

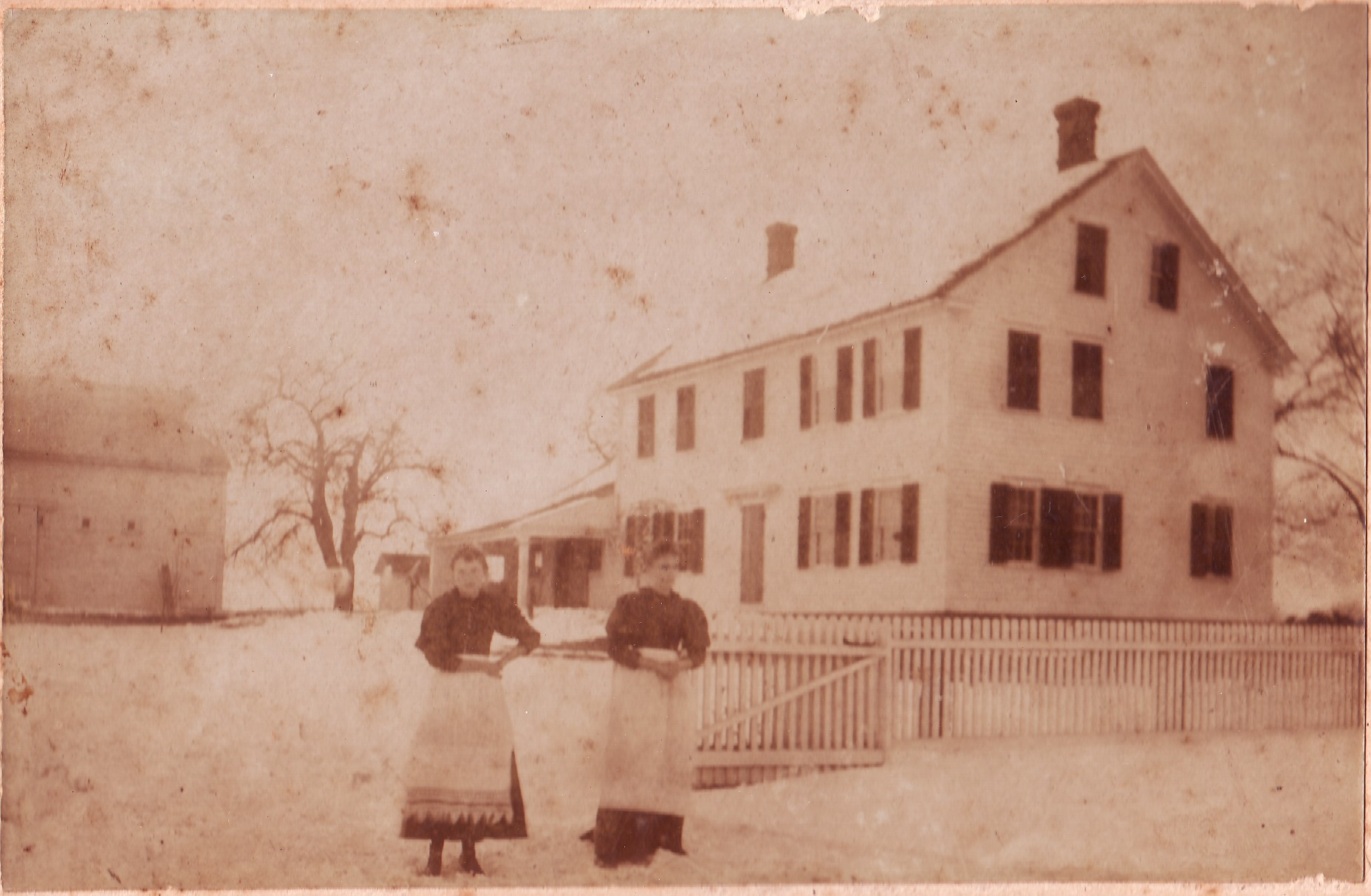
Steere's farm on Steere Rd. ca. 1900, Smithfield, RI

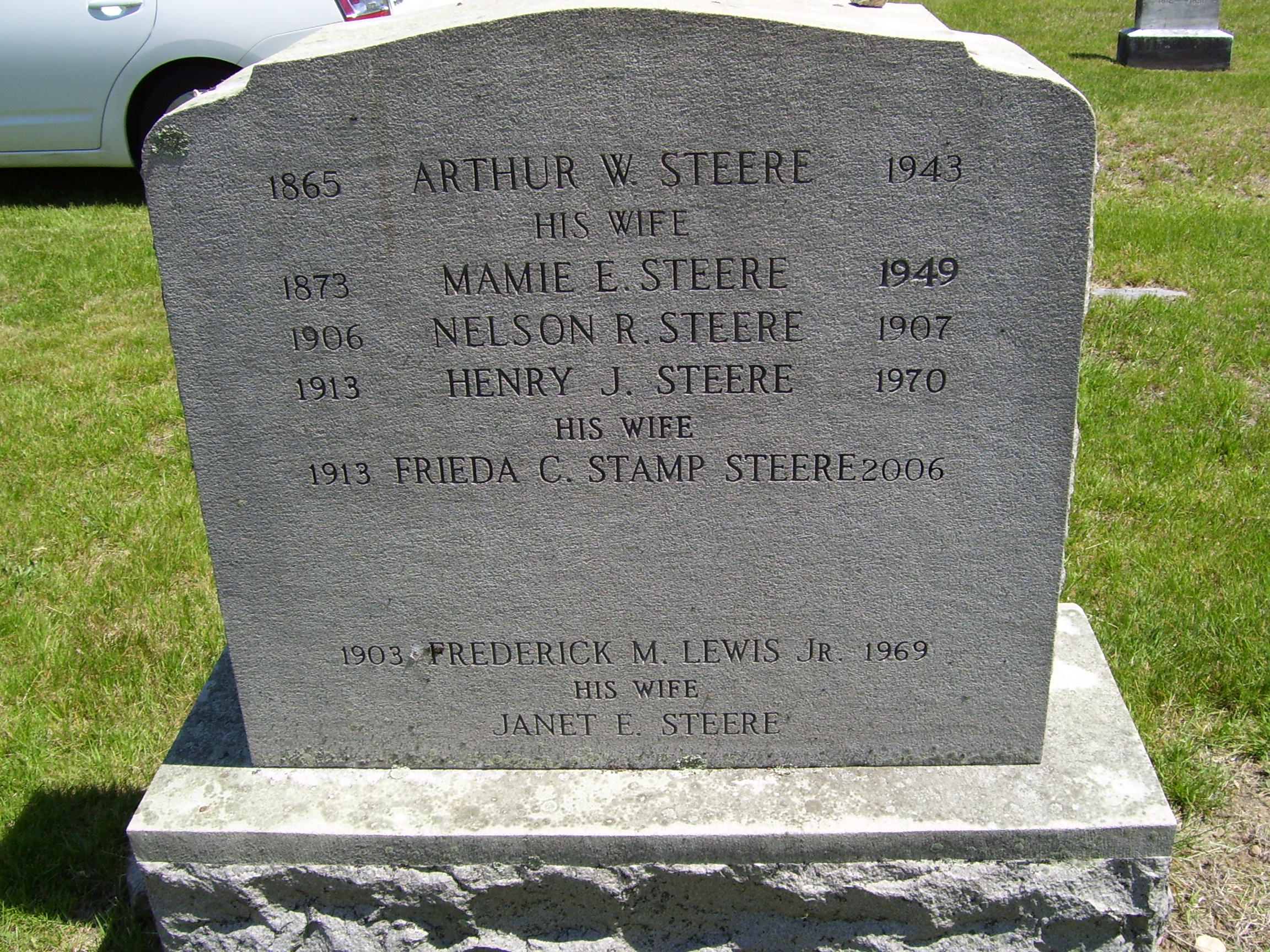
Steere's grave at Harmony Chapel Cemetery
