= USS Ponaganset =

WWII-era American fleet oiler

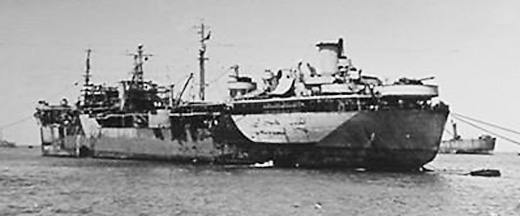
- USS Ponaganset

History

United States
- Name: USS Ponaganset
- Namesake: Ponaganset River in Rhode Island
- Builder: Marinship, Sausalito, California
- Laid down: 27 April 1942
- Launched: 10 July 1943
- Commissioned: 15 May 1944
- Decommissioned: 26 April 1946
- Stricken: 23 April 1947
- Honors and awards: 2 battle stars (World War II)
- Fate: Broke in two at Boston, 9 December 1947. Sold for scrap, 7 January 1949.

General characteristics
- Type: Suamico-class fleet replenishment oiler
- Displacement: 5,782 long tons (5,875 t) light; 22,380 long tons (22,739 t) full
- Length: 523 ft 6 in (159.56 m)
- Beam: 68 ft (21 m)
- Draft: 30 ft 10 in (9.40 m)
- Propulsion: Turbo-electric, single screw, 8,000 hp (5,966 kW)
- Speed: 15.5 knots (28.7 km/h; 17.8 mph)
- Capacity: 140,000 barrels (22,000 m^{3})
- Complement: 267 to 300
- Armament: 1 × 5"/38 caliber gun; 4 × 3"/50 caliber guns; 4 × twin 40 mm AA guns; 4 × twin 20 mm AA guns

USS Ponaganset AO-86/AOG-86) was a Suamico-class fleet oiler, of the T2-SE-A2 tanker hull type, serving in the United States Navy during World War II. Laid down on 27 April 1942, she was named for the Ponaganset River located in Foster and Glocester, Rhode Island.

Ponaganset was launched on 10 July 1943 after being built at Marinship, Sausalito, California, under Maritime Commission contract MC 1265. Sponsored by Mrs. J.W. Fowler, the ship was commissioned by the US Navy on 15 May 1944, and reported to the Pacific Fleet on 25 June 1944.

== Service history ==
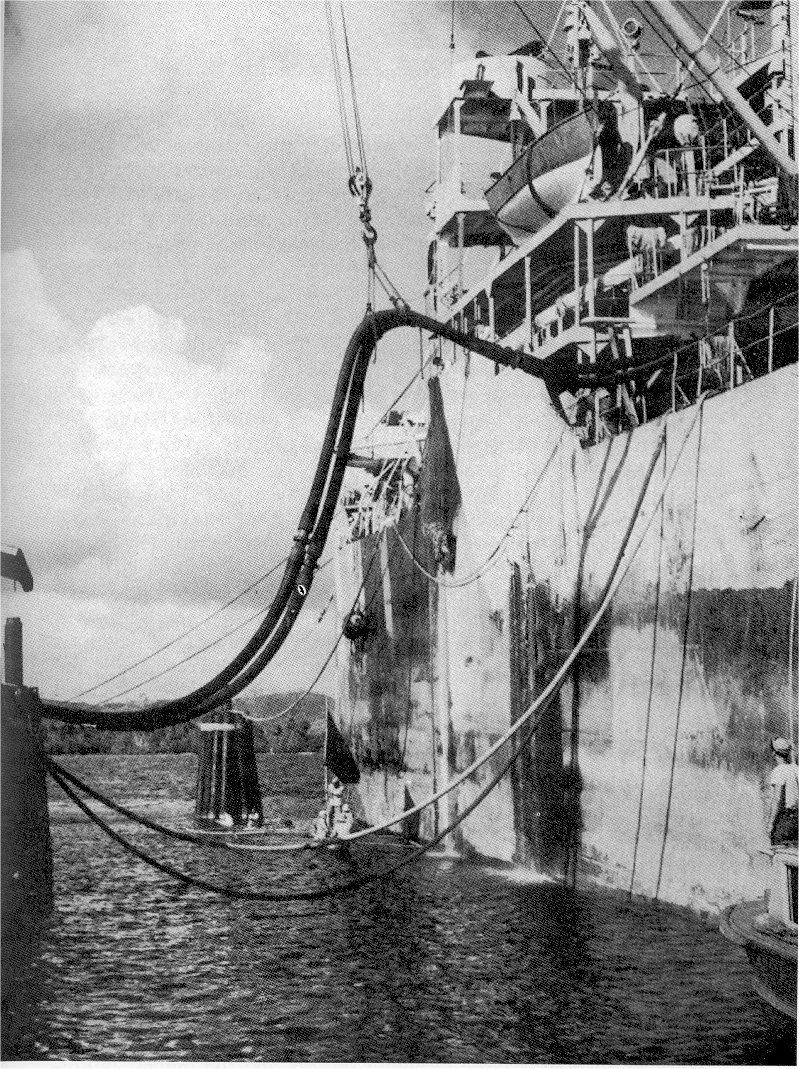
USS Ponaganset taking on water at Balusoa Water Point, Samar, Philippines, (in 1944 or 1945).

=== World War II, 1944–1946 ===
After shakedown off the west coast, Ponaganset arrived at Pearl Harbor on 17 July, and made a water run to Eniwetok and back before departing again on transporting potable water duties for Guadalcanal, Manus, Kossol, Ulithi, Peleliu, and Saipan, reaching Leyte on 22 March 1945.

The problem of getting fresh water to the smaller ships which did not have distilling apparatus became increasingly acute as the fleet moved westward. Large combatant ships and auxiliaries were ordered to issue water to small craft needing it, but demands could not be met solely in this way. The newly commissioned fleet oilers Ocklawaha and Ponaganset were used to carry potable water to ships and bases in the forward area.

Water was available at a number of points in the South Pacific for the 3rd Fleet, and in the Southwest Pacific for the Morotai Operation Interlude forces. It was likewise available on certain harbor craft in the Marshalls. At Manus, where 2,000,000 US gallons (7,600 m^{3}) a day, filtered and chlorinated, were available, it could be obtained after 1 September for both 3rd Fleet and Southwest Pacific forces. Besides the shore facilities at Manus, the barges YO-186, with 55,000 barrels (8,700 m^{3}), and YW-90, with 280,000 US gallons (1,100 m^{3}), were sent to Captain Ogden from Eniwetok late in August. They had been filled from the Ponaganset and from surplus in ships returning to Pearl.

In the South Pacific area where most of the amphibious forces were serviced, the naval base at Tulagi estimated that, between 15 August and 1 September, 20,917,000 US gallons (79,180 m^{3}) of water was supplied to LSTs, LCIs, and small craft. No figures are available for Guadalcanal, but that base supplied water in tremendous quantities to the ships and troops which staged in that area.

The Ponaganset, with 90,000 barrels (14,000 m^{3}) of water, reached Eniwetok on 2 August, discharged cargo, and returned to Pearl to reload. With a fresh 90,000 barrels (14,000 m^{3}) aboard, she was ordered to Guadalcanal to take part in the logistic preparations of the amphibious forces. From 27 August to 4 September she discharged fresh water to various harbor and patrol craft.

In April she carried water to the task force off Okinawa, returning there during each of the next three months while moving around the western Pacific touching at Ulithi, Guam, and Leyte where she was to be found at the war's end.

She then steamed to Ulithi, the Marianas, and Okinawa, before reaching Wakayama, Japan 26 September. She operated at various Japanese ports until steaming for San Francisco, arriving 5 January 1946. She then transited the Panama Canal, and arrived 18 February 1946 at her new home yard of New York City.

=== 1946–1949 ===
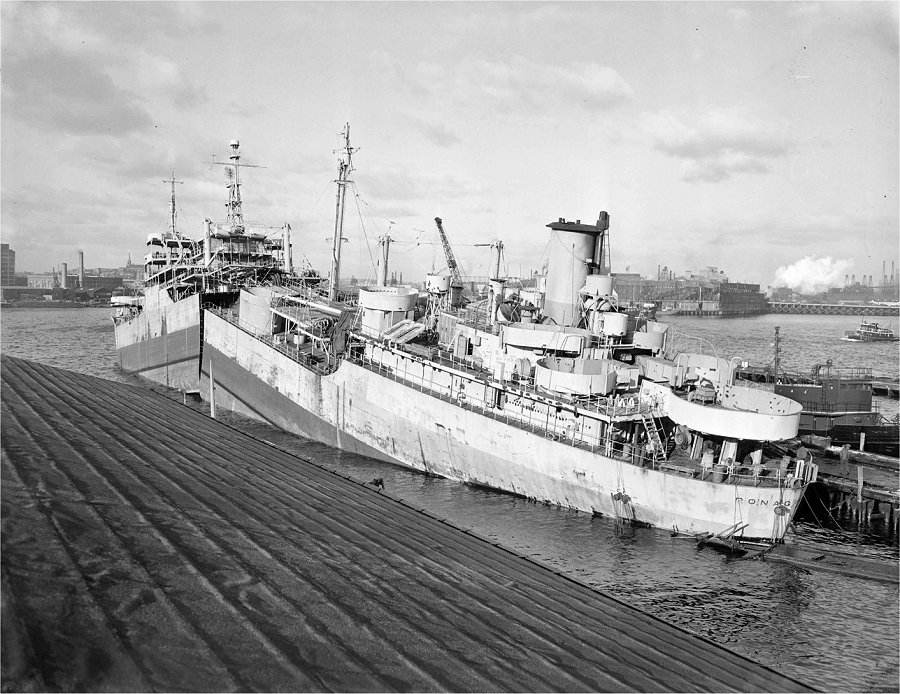
USS Ponaganset (AO-86), at the General Ship and Iron Works, Boston, MA., 9 December 1947

On 9 December 1947 Ponaganset fractured into two sections while tied at dockside in Boston:

The source of the fracture was an arc strike located at the toe of a fillet weld that joined a chock in the deck. ... The presence of the sharp cracks in the arc strike located in a region of high residual stress resulting from the fillet weld provided the necessary conditions for fracture initiation at temperatures below the NDT [nil ductility temperature]. As indicated by the fracture analysis diagram, the failure temperature was 15°F below the NDT temperature of the source plate. The steel was typical of the World War II production material which features relatively high carbon and low manganese contents.

— U.S. Naval Research Laboratory report 5920

On 2 March 1948 the vessel was reacquired by the navy "as is where is". On 2 June 1948 title was transferred back to the Maritime Commission at the Boston Naval Shipyard on 30 June 1948. She was sold for scrap to Northern Metal Company on 7 January 1949.

== Awards ==
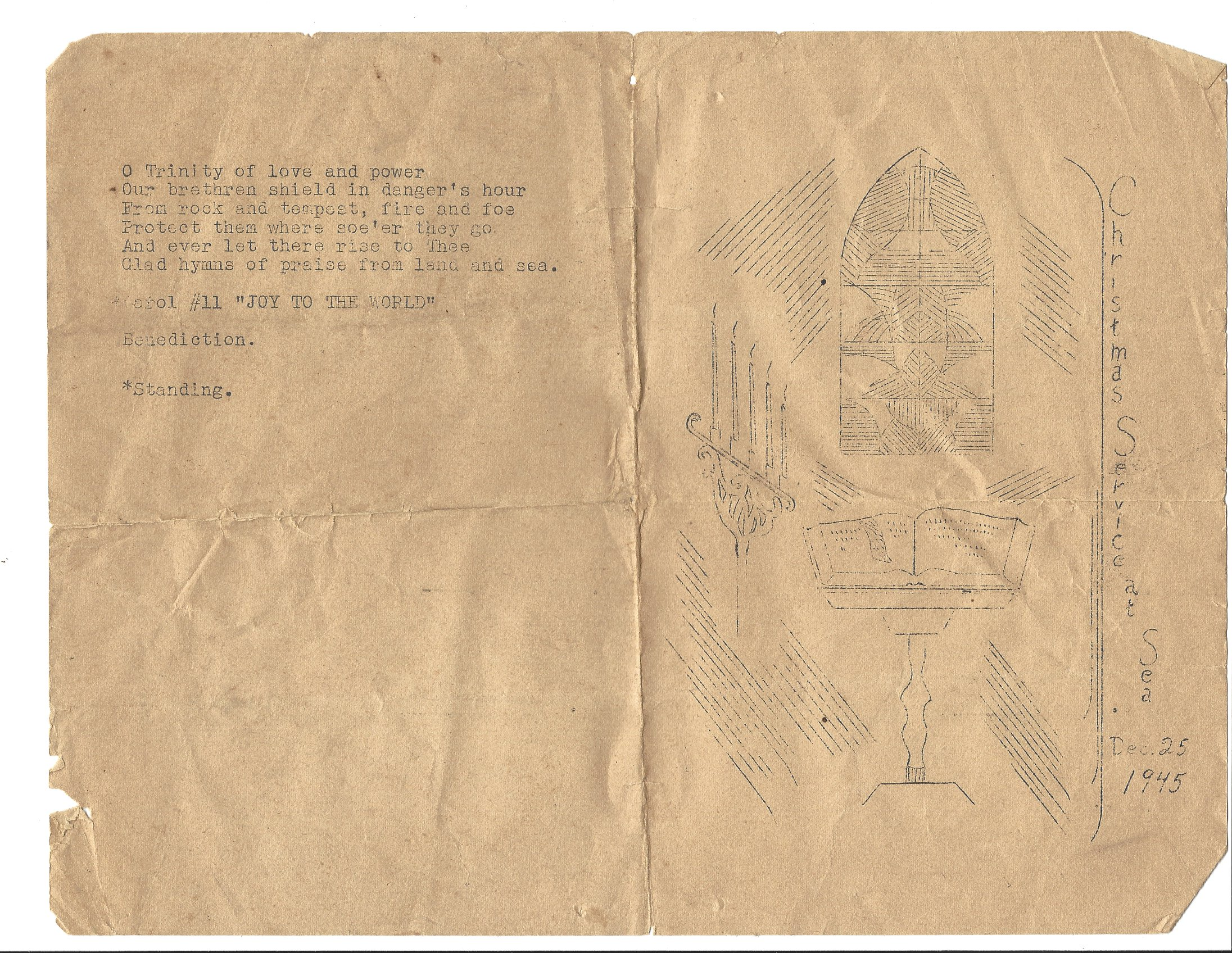
"Christmas at Sea" program used on the USS Ponaganset, 25 December 1945 (outside)

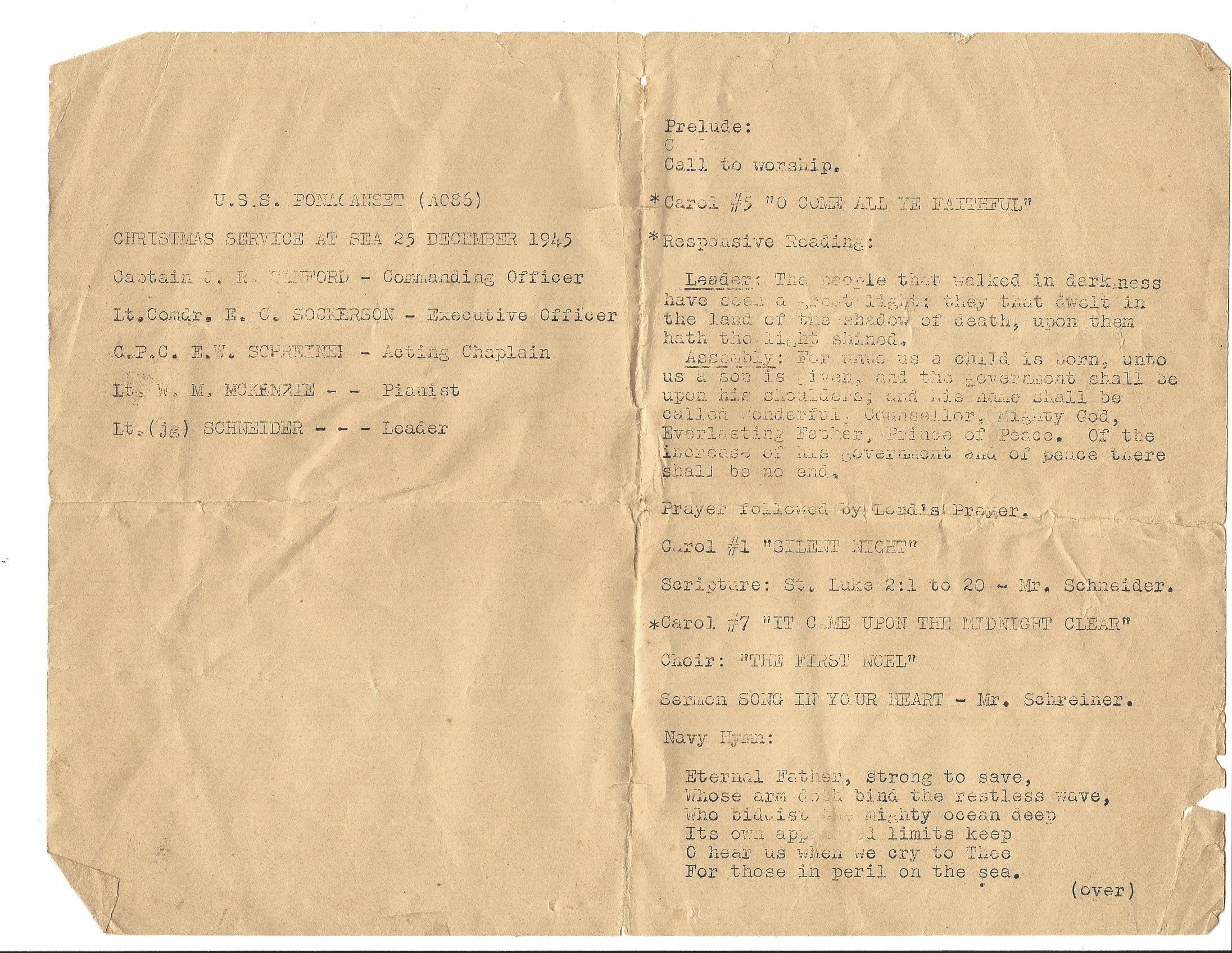
"Christmas at Sea" program used on the USS Ponaganset, 25 December 1945 (inside)

Ponaganset decommissioned on 26 April 1946 and was struck from the Navy List on 23 April 1947. She was returned to the Maritime Commission for disposal at Norfolk on 15 May 1947.

Ponaganset earned two battle stars for World War II service.
