= Scituate Reservoir =

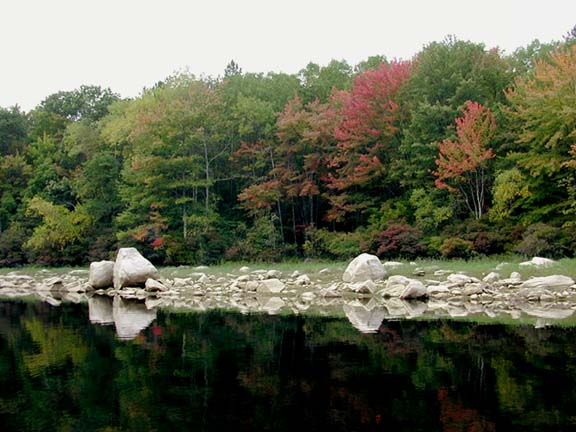
- shoreline in early autumn

- Location within Rhode Island Location within the United States
- Location: Scituate, Providence County, Rhode Island
- Coordinates: 41°46′21″N 71°36′39″W
- Type: Reservoir
- Primary inflows: North Branch Pawtuxet River; Moswansicut River; Ponaganset River
- Primary outflows: North Branch Pawtuxet River
- Catchment area: 94 sq mi (240 km^{2})
- Basin countries: United States
- Max. length: 7 mi (11 km)
- Max. width: 2.5 mi (4.0 km)
- Surface area: 5.3 sq mi (14 km^{2})
- Average depth: 32 ft (9.8 m)
- Max. depth: 87 ft (27 m)
- Water volume: 39×10^{9} US gal (150,000,000 m^{3}).
- Shore length^{1}: 66 mi (106 km)
- Surface elevation: 285 ft (87 m)
- ^{1} Shore length is not a well-defined measure.

The Scituate Reservoir is the largest inland body of water in the state of Rhode Island. It has an aggregate capacity of 39 billion US gallons (150,000,000 m^{3}) and a surface area of 5.3 square miles (14 km^{2}). It and its six tributary reservoirs—which make up a total surface area of 7.2 square miles (19 km^{2})—supply drinking water to more than 60 percent of the state population, including Providence.

The surrounding drainage basin that provides water to the reservoir system covers an area of about 94 square miles (240 km^{2}), which includes most of the town of Scituate and parts of Foster, Glocester, Johnston, and Cranston. The Scituate Reservoir is operated by Providence Water Supply Board.

== Water supply system ==
The reservoir is formed by an earth-filled dam spanning the North Branch Pawtuxet River, about 3,200 feet (980 m) long by 100 feet (30 m) high. An aqueduct from the dam carries water to a nearby treatment plant, which filters the water. Two major aqueducts carry the water from the plant into the distribution system. The original 90-inch (2,300 mm) aqueduct is 4.5 miles (7.2 km) long and ends at the siphon chamber in Cranston, where it splits into a series of smaller and smaller conduits that supply the water delivery system. The other 78- and 102-inch (2,600 mm) aqueduct is 9.5 miles (15.3 km) long and was built in the 1970s to supplement the original aqueduct. 75% of distribution is by gravity and 25% by pumping. The system consists of 870 miles (1,400 km) of water mains.

== History ==
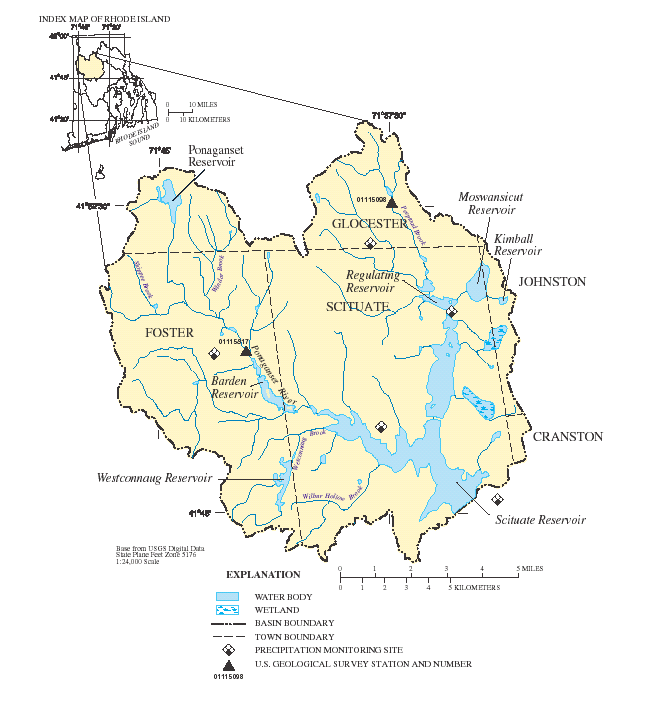
Scituate Reservoir drainage basin

Providence's original public water supply came from the Pawtuxet River at Pettaconsett in Cranston. The plan was approved in 1869 and the first service pipe opened on December 1, 1871. By 1910, with Providence's heavy industry growing and the supply system being expanded to surrounding communities, people realized that the flow from Pettaconsett would soon fall short of the rising demands. For some years, extremely dry weather caused water consumption to exceed the natural flow of the river, and water had to be supplied by small reservoirs owned by mill companies further upstream.

In January 1913, the Providence City Council appointed a Water Supply Board to locate a larger water supply for the city. They found a potential source at the head of the North Branch Pawtuxet River and its two main tributaries, the Moswansicut and Ponaganset Rivers. A new Water Supply Board was appointed in 1915 with powers to enact the legislation that cleared the way for construction of the reservoir.

Construction was well under way by 1921. At that time, it was the largest project ever undertaken in Rhode Island, and workers were housed in a temporary village established nearby. The reservoir was created by the construction of an earth-filled dam across the Pawtuxet River near the former village of Kent. The reservoir began storing water on November 10, 1925. The treatment plant began operation on September 30, 1926. At the official opening ceremonies that day, Providence Mayor Joseph H. Gainer called the $21,000,000 project the "City's Greatest" and said ".. the man to whom most of the credit for this undertaking belongs is Frank E. Winsor, the man who has been in charge of the work since 1915." The dam is known today as the Gainer Memorial Dam in honor of the mayor.

The plant was one of the most technologically advanced of its day and the only one of its kind in New England. It was renovated in the 1940s and again in the 1960s. It has a maximum capacity of 144 million US gallons (550,000 m^{3}) of water per day.

The issue of pollution of the reservoir was the primary reason for the cancellation of I-84 between Hartford and Providence in 1982.

On February 21, 1982, Pilgrim Airlines Flight 458 crash-landed on the frozen reservoir due to an in-flight fire.

=== Consequences ===
The creation of the reservoir flooded much of the town of Scituate, including the villages of Ashland, Kent, South Scituate, Richmond, and the western part of North Scituate. Other parts of town were destroyed as Providence acquired land surrounding the reservoir. In total, Providence acquired 23.1 square miles (60 km^{2}) of land. Most residents of this area were forced to move out of Scituate and received compensation from the city for the property they lost. Some individuals such as businessman and farmer Arthur Steere sold hundreds of acres for the creation of the Reservoir.

Between 1920 and 1930, the town's population decreased by 24 percent to 2,292, the lowest number since the 1780s. 1,195 buildings were demolished, which included 375 homes, 233 barns, 7 schools, and 6 mills. The loss of 30 dairy farms limited agricultural activity in town. The Providence and Danielson Railroad, an electric railway line that carried farm produce, granite, and lumber to Providence, was abandoned due to the project. 26.4 miles (42.5 km) of new roads had to be built to make up for the 36 miles (58 km) of roads that were also abandoned.

Most people complied as they were forced to settle elsewhere, but some families were unwilling to part with the houses they had inhabited for generations. The Joslin family, which owned large mills in the doomed villages, fought a long legal battle, which they eventually lost. After moving out, the family built an opulent rural estate on Field Hill. The Knight family, while selling their property, set fire to their house as they were reluctant to leave. A few residents even committed suicide.

== See also ==
- Moswansicut River
- North Branch Pawtuxet River
- Ponaganset River
- Quabbin Reservoir—A reservoir that supplies water to a large portion of neighboring Massachusetts
