= Ray Fogarty =

American politician (1957–2018)

Member of the Rhode Island House of Representatives
- In office 1983–1992

Raymond W. Fogarty (June 26, 1957 – September 27, 2018) was an American politician.

Fogarty was born in Providence, Rhode Island and graduated from Bryant University in 1979. He began working for the university soon after graduation and later became executive director of the Chafee Center for International Business at his alma mater. Fogarty lived with his wife and family in Harmony, Rhode Island, a small community located in the town of Glocester.

His cousin was Charles J. Fogarty who served as the Lieutenant Governor of Rhode Island. Ray Fogarty served on the Glocester Town Council before he was a member of the Rhode Island House of Representatives from 1983 to 1992, serving as a Democrat. He died in Charlotte, North Carolina on September 27, 2018, aged 61, while on a business trip.
