= Moswansicut River =

River in Rhode Island, United States

The Moswansicut River is a river in the U.S. state of Rhode Island. It flows approximately 6.2 miles (10.0 km), including its portion within the Scituate Reservoir. There are two dams along the river's length.

== Course ==
The river's source is Kimball Reservoir, located near Sickkibunkiaut Hill in Johnston. From there, the river flows to Moswansicut Pond, then on to the Scituate Reservoir. The river used to converge with the Ponaganset River to form the North Branch Pawtuxet River in the area that is now flooded by the Scituate Reservoir.

== Crossings ==
Below is a list all crossings over the Moswansicut River. The list starts at the headwaters and goes downstream.

- Scituate
  - Hopkins Avenue
  - West Greenville Road (RI 116)

== Tributaries ==
Huntinghouse and Peeptoad brooks are the only named tributaries of the Moswansicut River, though it has many unnamed streams that also feed it.

== See also ==
- List of rivers in Rhode Island
