= Pilgrim Airlines Flight 458 =

1982 aviation accident in Rhode Island

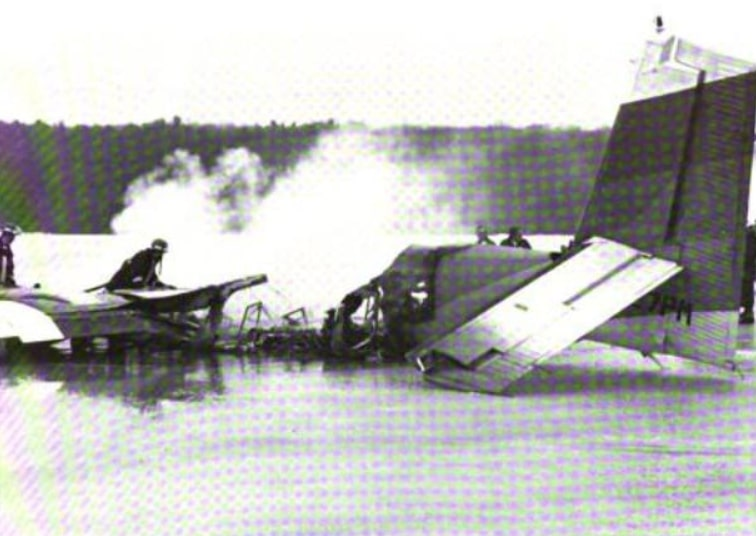
- Wreckage of the aircraft

Accident
- Date: February 21, 1982
- Summary: In-flight fire due to defective windshield washer/deicing system
- Site: Scituate Reservoir, Scituate, near Providence, Rhode Island, U.S.

Aircraft
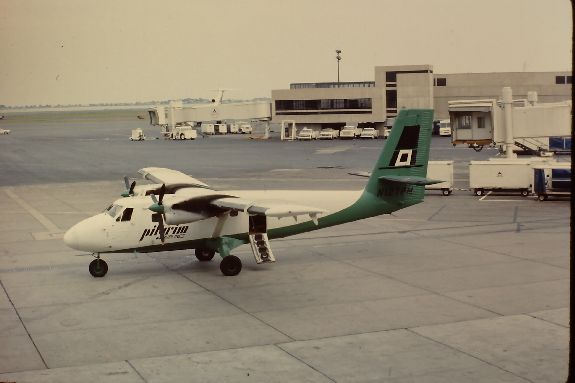
- N127PM, the aircraft involved in the accident, seen in 1975 with a previous livery
- Aircraft type: de Havilland Canada DHC-6-100 Twin Otter
- Operator: Pilgrim Airlines
- IATA flight No.: PM458
- ICAO flight No.: PMT458
- Call sign: PILGRIM 458
- Registration: N127PM
- Flight origin: LaGuardia Airport, New York City, New York, U.S.
- 1st stopover: Igor I. Sikorsky Memorial Airport, Stratford, Connecticut, U.S.
- 2nd stopover: Tweed New Haven Airport, New Haven, Connecticut, U.S.
- 3rd stopover: Groton–New London Airport, Groton, Connecticut, U.S.
- Destination: Logan International Airport, Boston, Massachusetts, U.S.
- Occupants: 12
- Passengers: 10
- Crew: 2
- Fatalities: 1
- Injuries: 11
- Survivors: 11

Pilgrim Airlines Flight 458 was a scheduled United States passenger air commuter flight from LaGuardia Airport in New York City to Logan Airport in Boston, Massachusetts, with stopovers in Bridgeport, New Haven, and Groton, Connecticut.

On February 21, 1982, the de Havilland Canada DHC-6-100 operating the flight made a forced landing on the frozen Scituate Reservoir near Providence, Rhode Island, after a fire erupted in the cockpit and cabin due to leakage of flammable windshield washer/deicing fluid. One passenger was unable to escape the aircraft and died of smoke inhalation, and eight of the remaining nine passengers, as well as both crew members, received serious injuries from the fire and crash-landing.

== Accident ==
The three legs of the flight from LaGuardia to Groton were uneventful. At Groton, the flight crew who had flown the first three legs handed off the aircraft to the flight crew for the final Groton-Boston leg, and flight 458 took off from Groton at 3:10 p.m. Eastern Standard Time. About 15 minutes later, while flying over northwestern Rhode Island, 27-year-old First Officer Lyle Hogg, observing light icing on the windshield, activated the windshield washer/deicer system (Note: This system, which sprayed isopropyl alcohol onto the windshield to clean it and melt ice, was one of two windshield deicing systems available for the DHC-6 at the time, the other option being an electrically-heated windshield; installation of one or the other system was required for DHC-6s to be operated in icing conditions. At the time of the accident, fewer than one out of every eleven DHC-6s in the global fleet (70 out of 780) were equipped with the alcohol washer/deicer system; of the remaining 710 DHC-6s, the NTSB report does not mention how many were equipped with the electrically-heated windshield, and how many had neither system installed (and were, thus, not equipped for operation in icing conditions).) twice, to little apparent effect; during the second deicing attempt, Hogg smelled alcohol, which prompted him to stop the deicing. (Note: Four of the surviving passengers also noticed an alcohol or chemical smell before the fire broke out.) Shortly afterwards, smoke started entering the cockpit around the base of the control column. (Note: The DHC-6 has a Y-shaped control column that comes up through a single opening in the cockpit floor (with the pilots' control wheels mounted at the ends of the arms of the Y), rather than (as with most aircraft with dual pilot positions) having two separate control columns in front of the captain's and first officer's seats.) 36-year-old Captain Thomas Prinster, contacted air traffic control, declared an emergency, and requested and received radar vectors direct to T. F. Green Airport, which serves Providence, for an emergency landing; the airport's emergency crews were called up to assist the aircraft upon its arrival.

The smoke in the cockpit rapidly thickened to the point that the pilots could not see their cockpit instruments or each other and had to open their side windows for visibility and air. Fire broke out in the cockpit and forward cabin as the aircraft descended from its cruising altitude of 4,000 feet (1,200 m), badly burning Prinster, Hogg, and, to a lesser degree, two passengers who attempted unsuccessfully to extinguish the cabin fire. Passengers described the fire in the cabin as "roll[ing]" or being like a "flaming river". (Note: The aircraft had two fire extinguishers on board, one mounted on the rear bulkhead of the cockpit behind First Officer Hogg's seat and one underneath the rearmost seat on the left side of the passenger cabin, but the cockpit extinguisher was too hot to handle and the cabin extinguisher was not visible when its seat was occupied, and would have been difficult to access even for an occupant who was aware of it.) The heat of the fire melted the flight crew's audio headsets, forcing them to be discarded.

During the emergency descent, one of the two passengers who attempted to fight the cabin fire, off-duty USAir flight engineer Harry Polychron, used a tennis racket to break cabin windows to try and clear smoke from the passenger cabin.

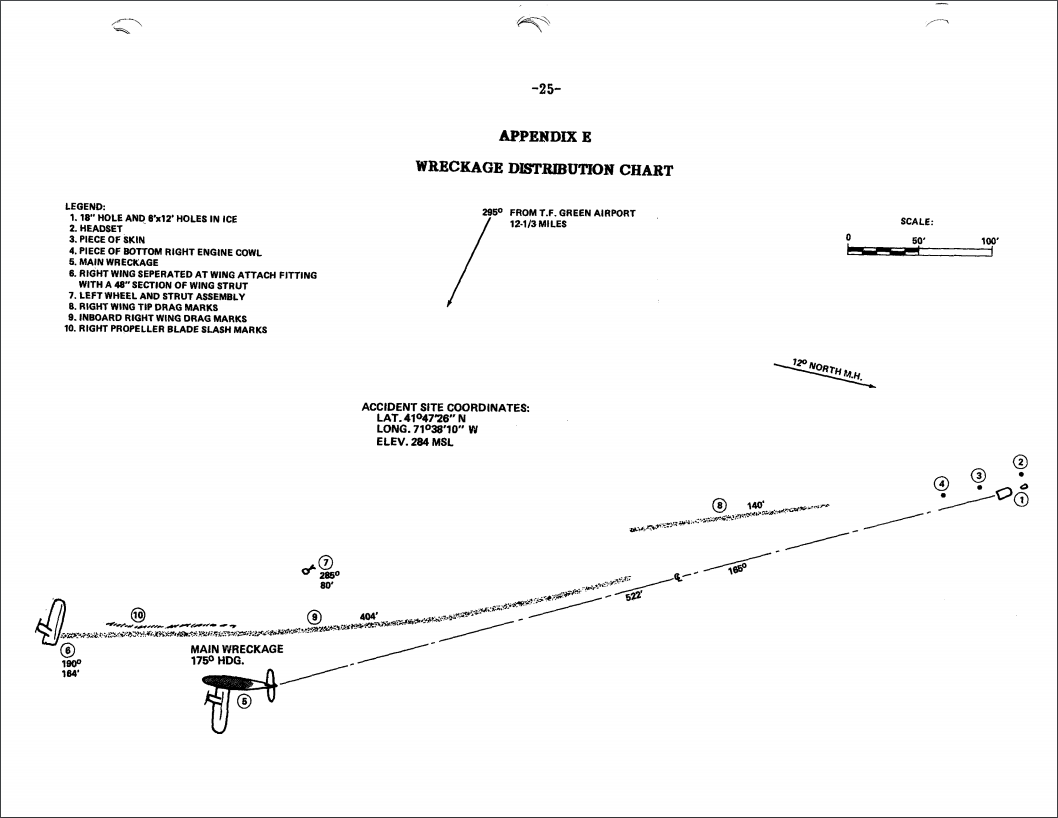
Distribution of wreckage from Flight 458 at the scene of the forced landing.

At 3:33 pm, unable to reach the Providence airport in time, Captain Prinster made a forced landing on the foot-thick ice of the western arm of Scituate Reservoir, 12.5 miles (10.9 nmi; 20.1 km) west-northwest of the airport, with the right wing and left main landing gear breaking off upon impact. The flight crew and nine of the ten passengers managed to evacuate the burning aircraft and walk to shore. The tenth, a 59-year-old New Hampshire woman with severe chronic obstructive pulmonary disease and marked atherosclerosis, was overcome by smoke and toxic gas before she could escape.

The first police and fire units reached the site of the accident at about the time the survivors of the crash reached the shoreline. All of the victims were taken to Rhode Island Hospital in Providence, a trauma center, for medical attention.

Of the eleven survivors, all but one sustained serious injuries in the accident; most of the passengers received blunt-force injuries of varying severity in the hard landing, and the flight crew and two passengers were burned by the inflight fire: Captain Prinster received second-to-third-degree burns over 50 to 70 percent of his body surface and spent months in hospital, but ultimately survived; First Officer Hogg, although also suffering second-to-third-degree burns, was burned less extensively, due both to his wearing thicker clothing and to the fire being concentrated on the left side of the aircraft; and the two burned passengers sustained first-and-second-degree burns to their hands and arms. All of the survivors suffered from smoke inhalation.

The aircraft's fuselage was almost completely destroyed by fire after the landing, with the only surviving parts of the passenger cabin being the stainless-steel seat frames (Note: Stainless steel has a far higher melting point than the aluminum alloys used for the aircraft's primary structure.) and melted lower-fuselage structure.

== Investigation and aftermath ==
Due to the fire breaking out immediately after the attempts to deice the windshield, the alcohol smell detected by the first officer just before the smoke started to appear, and the liquid, flowing nature of the fire in the passenger cabin, the National Transportation Safety Board (NTSB)'s investigation focused on the windshield washer/deicer system. (Note: Pilgrim Airlines removed the washer/deicer system from all their DHC-6s two days after the accident.)

This system consisted of a polyethylene reservoir holding up to 1.5 US gal (5.7 L; 1.2 imp gal) of isopropyl alcohol, an electric pump, and nozzles to spray the alcohol onto the windshield, with Tygon tubing running from the reservoir to the pump and from the pump to the spray nozzles. The aircraft's washer/deicer had a history of leakage resulting from the Tygon tubing's incompatibility with isopropyl alcohol, exposure to which caused the ends of the tubing to become hardened and misshapen; the degraded tubing ends no longer fit tightly to their attachment points, and could sometimes separate completely. To fix this leakage, maintenance personnel had to periodically cut off the hardened, misshapen ends of the tubing and reattach the newly-shortened tubing, eventually shortening the tubing enough to require that more tubing be spliced on in order for the tubing to reach its attachment points without stretching. The procedures used by Pilgrim Airlines, and approved by de Havilland, at the time of the accident allowed the tubing to be secured to its attachment points by wrapping the connections with safety wire, and did not require the use of a clamp to hold the connection in place.

Several months prior to the accident, while on the ground at LaGuardia, the tubing on the accident aircraft's washer/deicer system was found to have separated from the pump outlet; this occurred again just three days before the accident, when a pilot observed alcohol leaking from the pump outlet fitting, from which the tubing had separated, during a stopover in New Haven. The washer/deicer was repaired later that day, but the methods routinely used to secure the Tygon tubing did not positively ensure that it would stay attached to the pump and reservoir.

Post-accident testing using an exemplar pump, reservoir, and tubing (Note: The washer/deicer system from the accident aircraft was, with the exception of a partially-melted piece of the reservoir, completely destroyed by fire, and was, therefore, unavailable for testing.) showed that, with the pump outlet disconnected from its tubing, a slow leak from the pump would occur even with the pump not operating. If the pump was activated without the tubing being connected to its outlet, it would spray liquid forward for up to 7 feet (2.1 m); in its installed position in the aircraft, this would spray flammable isopropyl alcohol throughout the compartment under the cockpit floor, an area which contained numerous possible ignition sources. (Note: The exact ignition source could not be determined, as there were several different possibilities and this area of the aircraft – as with most of the fuselage – was gutted by fire after landing.)

The NTSB considered the alcohol washer/deicer system to pose a serious fire hazard, and recommended its removal from the DHC-6s which used it; the Federal Aviation Administration agreed, and issued an Airworthiness Directive in December 1982 which prohibited the system from being used for deicing past November 30, 1983, eliminating the use of highly-flammable isopropyl alcohol in the system, and required the installation of an electrically-heated windshield for DHC-6s certified to be flown in icing conditions after that date.

== Awards and honors ==
For their work in flying the aircraft to a successful landing despite the extremely hostile cockpit environment, and thereby saving the lives of nearly everyone on board, Captain Prinster and First Officer Hogg were jointly awarded the Flight Safety Foundation's Heroism Award for 1982. Also, the Order of Daedalians awarded Prinster the Lieutenant General Harold L. George Civilian Airmanship Award.

In November 2019, Prinster and Hogg were both inducted into the Rhode Island Aviation Hall of Fame - Prinster posthumously - for their heroic actions.

Additionally, a public park in Scituate not far from the crash site was named after, and dedicated to, both pilots of Flight 458.

== Return to flying ==
Both pilots eventually returned to flying with Pilgrim Airlines, although for Prinster this lasted only briefly before he retired from commercial aviation; he died in 2018 due to lingering complications of lung damage from the Flight 458 fire.

Hogg moved to US Airways in 1984 and eventually became that airline's vice president of flight operations, before serving as president and CEO of Piedmont Airlines from 2015 through 2020.

== In popular culture ==
The crash of Pilgrim Airlines Flight 458 was featured in the 2024 episode "Fight for Survival", of the Canadian-made, internationally distributed documentary series Mayday, also known as Air Disasters.
