= North Branch Pawtuxet River =

River in Rhode Island, United States

Coordinates: 41.7505°N 71.5855°W

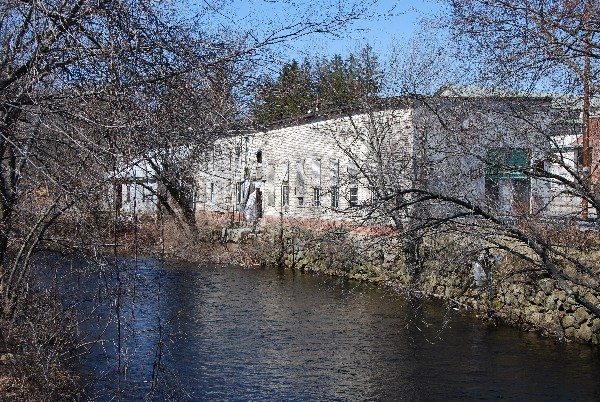
North Branch Pawtuxet River at Harris Mill Village

The North Branch Pawtuxet River is a river in the U.S. state of Rhode Island. It flows approximately 8.9 miles (14.3 km). There are 9 dams along the river's length.

== Course ==
The river is formed by the confluence of the Ponaganset and Moswansicut rivers in the area that is now flooded by the Scituate Reservoir, the primary drinking water supply for the city of Providence as well as other cities and towns in the metro area. From the reservoir, it flows southeast through the historic textile mill villages of Hope, Arkright, Harris, Phenix, Lippitt and then into River Point, West Warwick where it converges with the South Branch Pawtuxet River to form the main branch of the Pawtuxet River.

== Crossings ==
Below is a list of all crossings over the North Branch Pawtuxet River. The list starts at the headwaters and goes downstream.

- Scituate
  - Scituate Avenue (RI 12) (Historic R.I. Bridge)
  - Main Street (RI 116)
  - Colvin Street
- West Warwick
  - Lincoln Avenue
  - Fairview Avenue
  - Main Street (RI 115)

== Tributaries ==
In addition to many unnamed tributaries, the following brooks also feed the North Branch Pawtuxet:

- Burlingame Brook
- Clarke Brook
- Lippitt Brook

== See also ==
- List of rivers in Rhode Island
- Moswansicut River
- Pawtuxet River
- Ponaganset River
- South Branch Pawtuxet River
- Scituate Reservoir
