= Ponaganset High School =

Location
- 137 Anan Wade Road; North Scituate, Rhode Island 02857; United States; 41°51′57″N 71°42′45″W

Information
- Type: Public
- School district: Foster-Glocester
- CEEB code: 400093
- NCES School ID: 440042000116
- Principal: Renee Palazzo (2012)
- Teaching staff: 70.00 (FTE)
- Grades: 9 to 12
- Enrollment: 900 (2023-2024)
- Student to teacher ratio: 12.86
- Colors: Green and White
- Sports: Cross country, Soccer, Basketball, Volleyball, Football, Wrestling, Track and field (Indoor and Outdoor), Hockey, Baseball, Fastpitch softball, and Tennis
- Mascot: Chieftain
- Nickname: Chieftains
- Website: fosterponaganseths.ss11.sharpschool.com

Ponaganset High School is a school of the Foster-Glocester School District, located in Glocester, Rhode Island in Providence County. (It has a North Scituate, Rhode Island address for postal purposes.) The majority of high school students live in the rural towns of Glocester and Foster, Rhode Island. This is a public high school, known for its music program, AP and honors classes, as well as its CTE approved pathways; plant systems, animal systems, materials and manufacturing, pre-engineering, music technology, music performance, and pending programs: computer science and information technology, and biomedicine. The school's athletic teams are named the "Chieftains," and the FIRST Robotics Competition team is called "5112, The Gongoliers." The principal as of 2025 was Amanda Grundel.

== Demographics ==
The demographic breakdown of the 900 students enrolled for the 2023–2024 school year was:

- Male – 50.3%
- Female – 49.4%
- American Indian/Alaska Native – 0.2%
- Asian – 0.8%
- Black – 0.6%
- Hispanic – 6.0%
- White – 89.1%
- Two or more races – 3.1%

Additionally, 14.2% of the students were eligible for free or reduced-price lunch.

== Mascot Controversy ==
Ponaganset's mascot is the Chieftain in a full headdress. The Foster-Glocester School District mascot came under controversy by the local Nipmuc Tribe, who have repeatedly expressed their displeasure with it. As mascots with Native American imagery and symbolism have been reevaluated, the Rhode Island Commission on Prejudice and Bias was initially scheduled to present their case for replacing the mascot, but this has been postponed indefinitely.

== Capital improvement plan ==
In the late 2000s, the school underwent a major multi-phase renovation in which the former middle school was relocated to a new building and the existing high school took over the old middle school structure. An indoor glass walkway was put in to attach the high school with the old middle school. The renovations were completed at the end of 2009.

== Notable alumni ==
- Sherwood C. Spring, retired United States Army Colonel and former NASA astronaut and graduate of the Class of 1963.
- Samuel Ejnes, award-winning re-recording mixer known for his work on television series such as What We Do in the Shadows and Yellowstone. He graduated from Ponaganset High School in 2006.
