= Ponaganset River =

River in Rhode Island, United States

Coordinates: 41.8320°N 71.7302°W

The Ponaganset River is a river in the U.S. state of Rhode Island. It flows approximately 12.5 miles (20.1 km). There are three dams along the river's length.

== Course ==
The river's source is Ponaganset Reservoir in Glocester. It then flows roughly southeast through Glocester and Foster, then into Scituate to the Scituate Reservoir. The river used to converge with the Moswansicut River to form the North Branch Pawtuxet River in the area that is now flooded by the reservoir.

== Crossings ==
Below is a list of all crossings over the Ponaganset River. The list starts at the headwaters and goes downstream.

- Glocester
  - George Allen Road
- Foster
  - Hartford Avenue (RI 101)
  - Winsor Road
  - Pine Tree Road
  - Old Danielson Pike
  - Danielson Pike (U.S. 6)
  - Ram Tail Road
  - Central Pike
- Scituate
  - Ponaganset Road
  - Plainfield Pike (RI 14)

== Tributaries ==
In addition to many unnamed tributaries, the following brooks feed the Ponaganset:

- Shippee Brook
- Winsor Brook
- Dolly Cole Brook

== See also ==
- List of rivers in Rhode Island
- Moswansicut River
- North Branch Pawtuxet River
- Scituate Reservoir
