= Glocester Town Pound =

- U.S. National Register of Historic Places
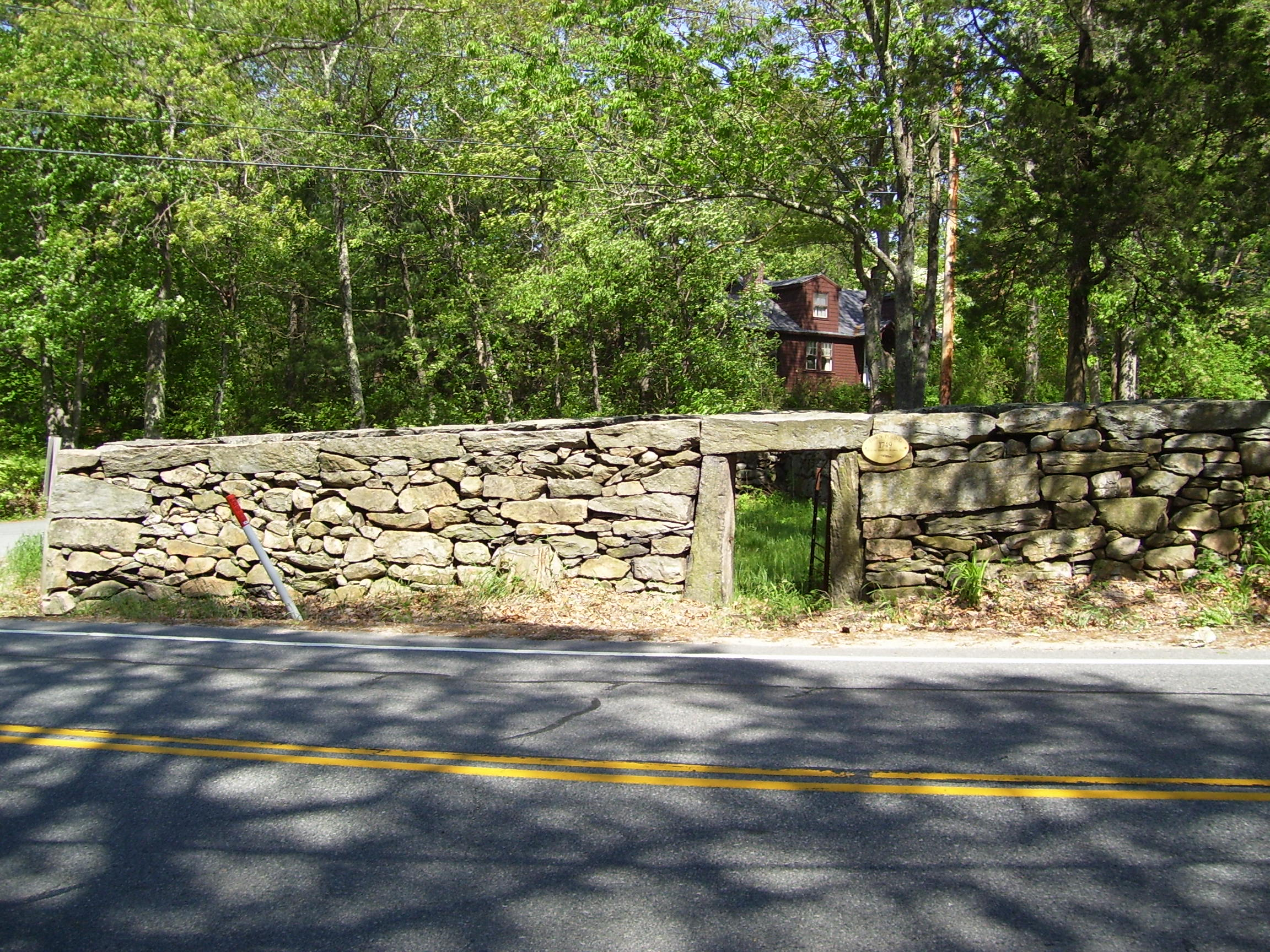

- Location within Rhode Island Location within the United States
- Location: Glocester, Rhode Island
- Coordinates: 41°53′44″N 71°40′9″W
- Built: 1748
- NRHP reference No.: 70000021
- Added to NRHP: September 22, 1970

The Glocester Town Pound is a historic animal pound on Pound Road and Chopmist Hill Road in Glocester, Rhode Island.

The stone pound was built in 1748 to confine stray livestock and is claimed by the town to be the oldest extant pound in America. It was added to the National Register of Historic Places in 1970.

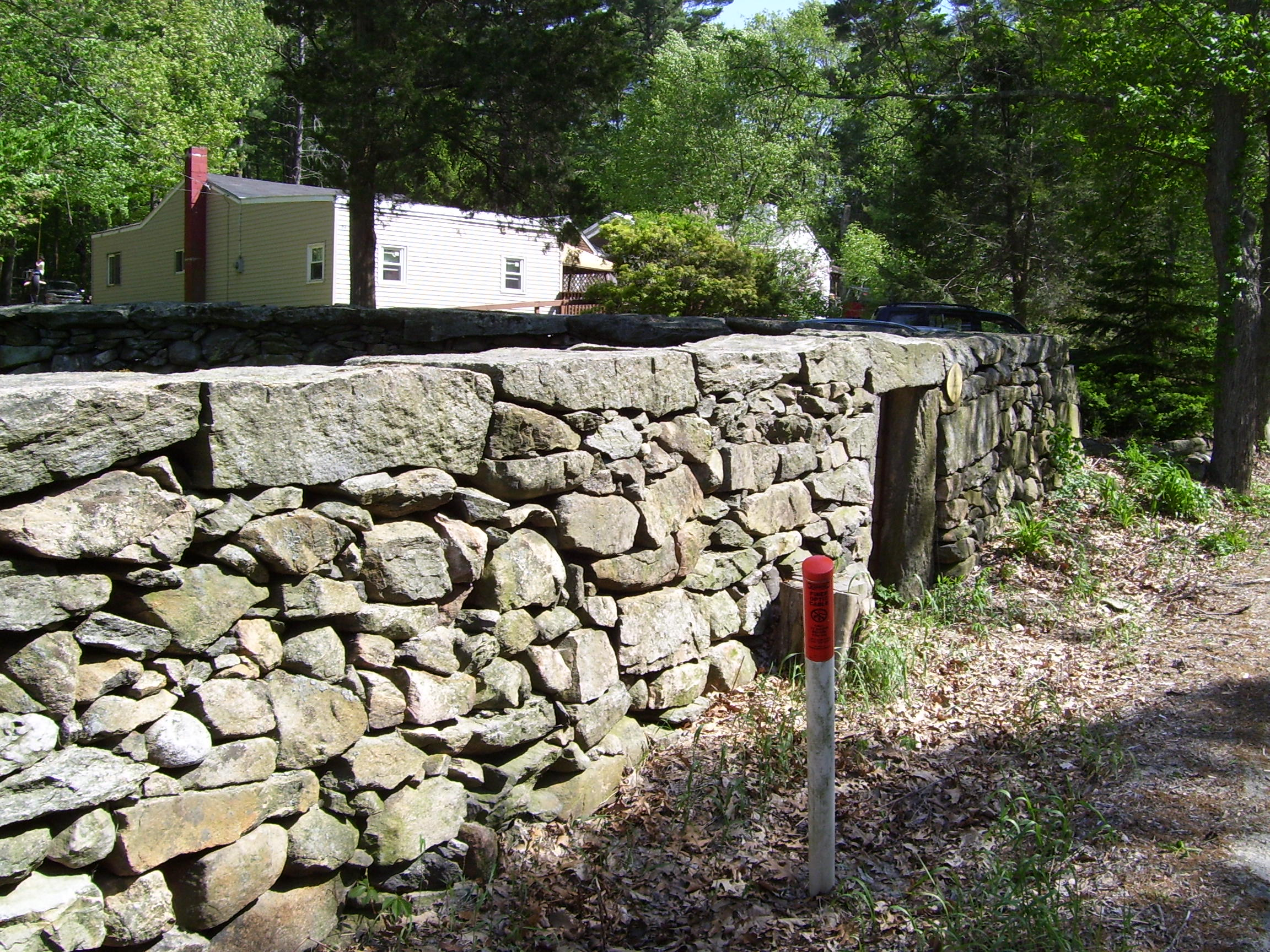
Town Pound

== See also ==
- National Register of Historic Places listings in Providence County, Rhode Island
