= Harmony, Rhode Island =

Census-designated place in Rhode Island, United States

- Census-designated place
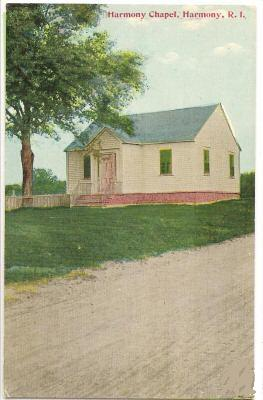
- Harmony Chapel Cemetery on U.S. Route 44 around the start of the 20th century

- Location of the CDP in Providence County and the state of Rhode Island.
- Coordinates: 41°53′16″N 71°35′48″W
- Country: United States
- State: Rhode Island
- County: Providence

Area
  - Total: 2.97 sq mi (7.68 km^{2})
  - Land: 2.94 sq mi (7.62 km^{2})
  - Water: 0.023 sq mi (0.06 km^{2})
- Elevation: 554 ft (169 m)

Population (2020)
  - Total: 1,036
  - Density: 352/sq mi (135.9/km^{2})
- Time zone: UTC-5 (Eastern (EST))
  - Summer (DST): UTC-4 (EDT)
- ZIP code: 02814
- Area code: 401
- FIPS code: 44-33040
- GNIS feature ID: 2629815

Harmony is a village and census-designated place in Providence County, Rhode Island, United States, in the town of Glocester, located on U.S. Route 44 (Putnam Pike). As of the 2020 census, Harmony had a population of 1,036.

== Local sites and history ==
The historic 1816 Harmony Chapel and Cemetery are located at the center of the village. Several restaurants, the Harmony Library and golf courses are located nearby. In the early nineteenth century, a toll booth of the Glocester Turnpike was located in Harmony to raise funds to maintain the road, until it was abolished in the 1850s.

== Geography ==
According to the U.S. Census Bureau, Harmony has a total area of 2.97 mi^{2} (7.68 km^{2}), of which 2.94 mi^{2} (7.62 km^{2}) is land and 0.023 mi^{2} (0.060 km^{2}), or 0.78%, is water.

== Demographics ==
Historical population
Census	Pop.	Note	%±
2020	1,036		—
U.S. Decennial Census

=== 2020 census ===
The 2020 United States census counted 1,036 people, 415 households, and 305 families in Harmony. The population density was 352.0 per square mile (135.9/km^{2}). There were 489 housing units at an average density of 166.2 per square mile (64.2/km^{2}). The racial makeup was 91.22% (945) white or European American (90.25% non-Hispanic white), 1.83% (19) black or African-American, 0.1% (1) Native American or Alaska Native, 0.1% (1) Asian, 0.0% (0) Pacific Islander or Native Hawaiian, 1.64% (17) from other races, and 5.12% (53) from two or more races. Hispanic or Latino of any race was 3.67% (38) of the population.

Of the 415 households, 22.4% had children under the age of 18; 56.4% were married couples living together; 18.8% had a female householder with no spouse or partner present. 24.6% of households consisted of individuals and 7.5% had someone living alone who was 65 years of age or older. The average household size was 2.9 and the average family size was 3.3. The percent of those with a bachelor’s degree or higher was estimated to be 30.5% of the population.

19.8% of the population was under the age of 18, 8.0% from 18 to 24, 19.8% from 25 to 44, 35.0% from 45 to 64, and 17.4% who were 65 years of age or older. The median age was 48.5 years. For every 100 females, the population had 95.8 males. For every 100 females ages 18 and older, there were 104.7 males.

The 2016–2020 5-year American Community Survey estimates show that the median household income was $79,318 (with a margin of error of +/- $23,977) and the median family income was $90,662 (+/- $51,841). Males had a median income of $42,250 (+/- $36,909) versus $41,506 (+/- $9,376) for females. The median income for those above 16 years old was $41,658 (+/- $5,707). Approximately, 5.9% of families and 9.4% of the population were below the poverty line, including 6.4% of those under the age of 18 and 0.0% of those ages 65 or over.

== Images ==
Yan-Yan-Ke Club in Harmony at the start of the 20th Century

Warren Estate on Sawmill Road in Harmony

Sen. Arthur Steere's birthplace on the corner of Snake Hill & Sawmill Roads

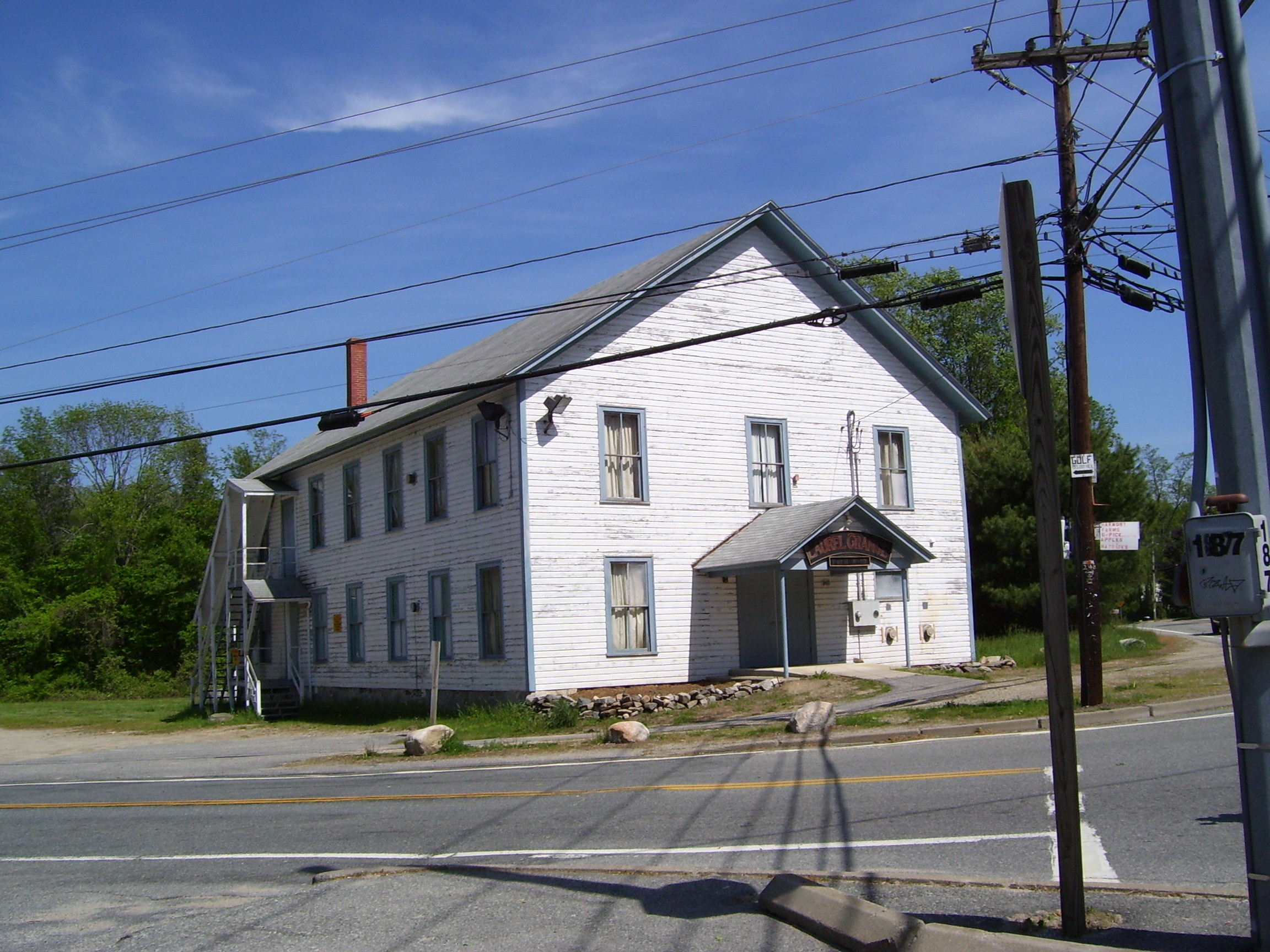
Laurel Grange on Snake Hill & Sawmill Road
