= Cherry Valley Archeological Site, RI-279 =

- U.S. National Register of Historic Places
- Nearest city: Glocester, Rhode Island
- NRHP reference No.: 84000358
- Added to NRHP: November 1, 1984

Cherry Valley Archeological Site, RI-279 is an archaeological site in Glocester, Rhode Island

The site contains various archaeological evidence from the pre-historic era. The site was added to the National Register of Historic Places on November 1, 1984.

== See also ==
- National Register of Historic Places listings in Providence County, Rhode Island
