= Manton–Hunt–Farnum Farm =

- U.S. National Register of Historic Places
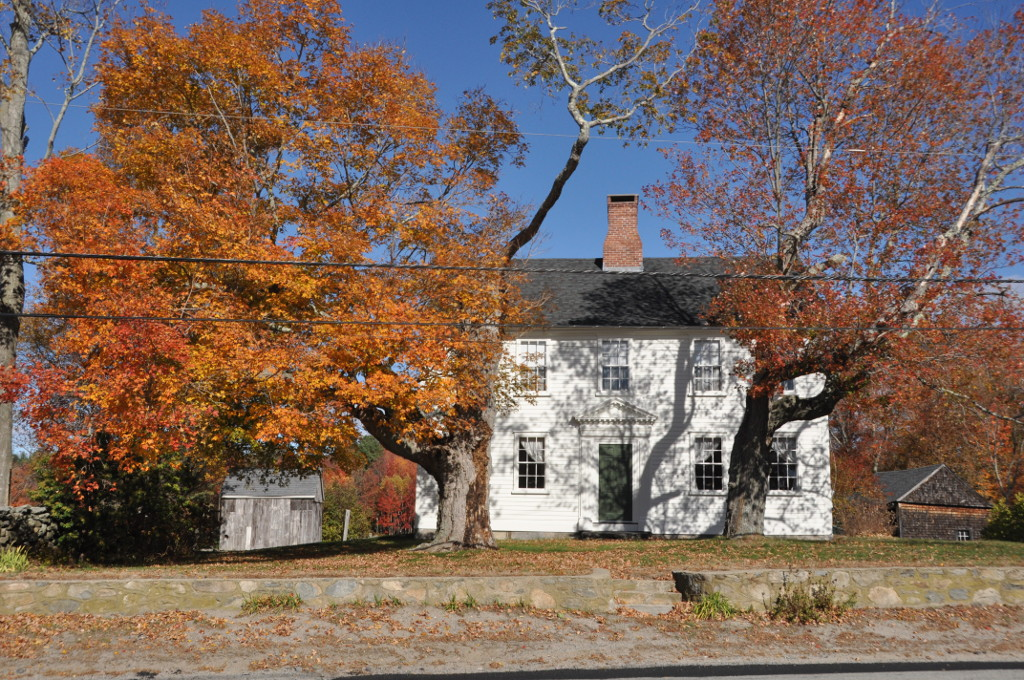

- Location within Rhode Island Location within the United States
- Location: Glocester, Rhode Island
- Coordinates: 41°53′54″N 71°37′15″W
- Area: 21 acres (8.5 ha)
- Built: 1793
- Architectural style: Federal
- NRHP reference No.: 85002735
- Added to NRHP: October 3, 1985

The Maton–Hunt–Farnum Farm, also known as the Pardon Hunt Farm, is an historic farm located on Putnam Pike in Glocester, Rhode Island. The main house is a 2 1/2-story wood-frame structure, consisting of five bays in width, featuring a gable roof and a central chimney. It is situated on the north side of Putnam Pike. The property includes various farm outbuildings such as barns, henhouses, a corn crib, and a privy, located behind the main house. Constructed around 1793 by Daniel Manton, the house showcases exemplary Federal-style architecture both internally and externally.

This property was officially added to the National Register of Historic Places in 1985.

== See also ==
- National Register of Historic Places listings in Providence County, Rhode Island
