= Harmony Chapel and Cemetery =

Historic site in Providence County, Rhode Island, US

- U.S. National Register of Historic Places
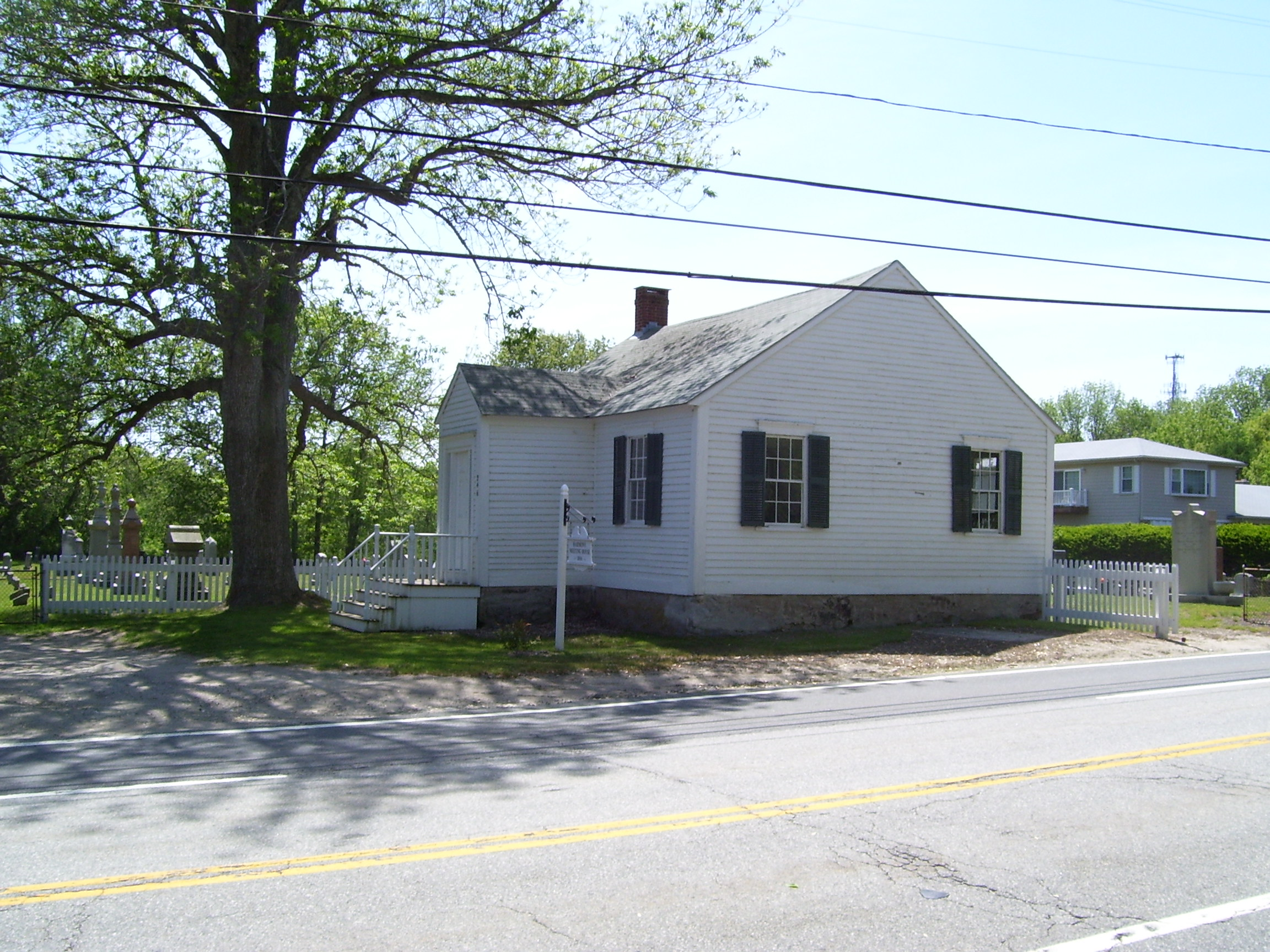

- Location within Rhode Island Location within the United States
- Location: Harmony, Rhode Island
- Coordinates: 41°53′20″N 71°36′01″W
- Area: 2 acres (0.81 ha)
- Architectural style: Federal
- NRHP reference No.: 80000098
- Added to NRHP: June 25, 1980

The Harmony Chapel and Cemetery (also known as "Harmony Meeting House" or "Harmony Cemetery") are a historic church and cemetery in Harmony, Rhode Island, a village in Glocester.

== Overview ==
The wood-frame chapel adjacent to the cemetery sits on US Route 44 west of Edgewood Drive. Built as a schoolhouse in c. 1830, it is one of the few Federal-style schoolhouses to survive in the state, and is probably the best-preserved of that period. It was later (by 1870) converted for use as a meeting house (free chapel) for villagers. Residents would occasionally hire ministers to speak and hold various Christian religious ceremonies.

The cemetery behind the chapel was used as a private cemetery by the Steere, Smith and other local families until opened for public use in 1878.

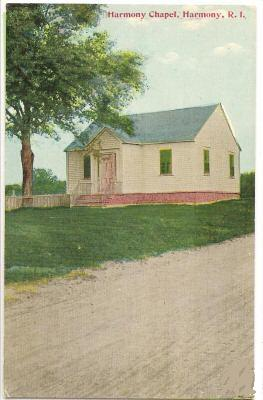
Harmony Chapel and Cemetery, c. 1905

== See also ==
- National Register of Historic Places in Providence County, Rhode Island
