= Glocester, Rhode Island =

Glocester
- Town
- Town of Glocester, Rhode Island
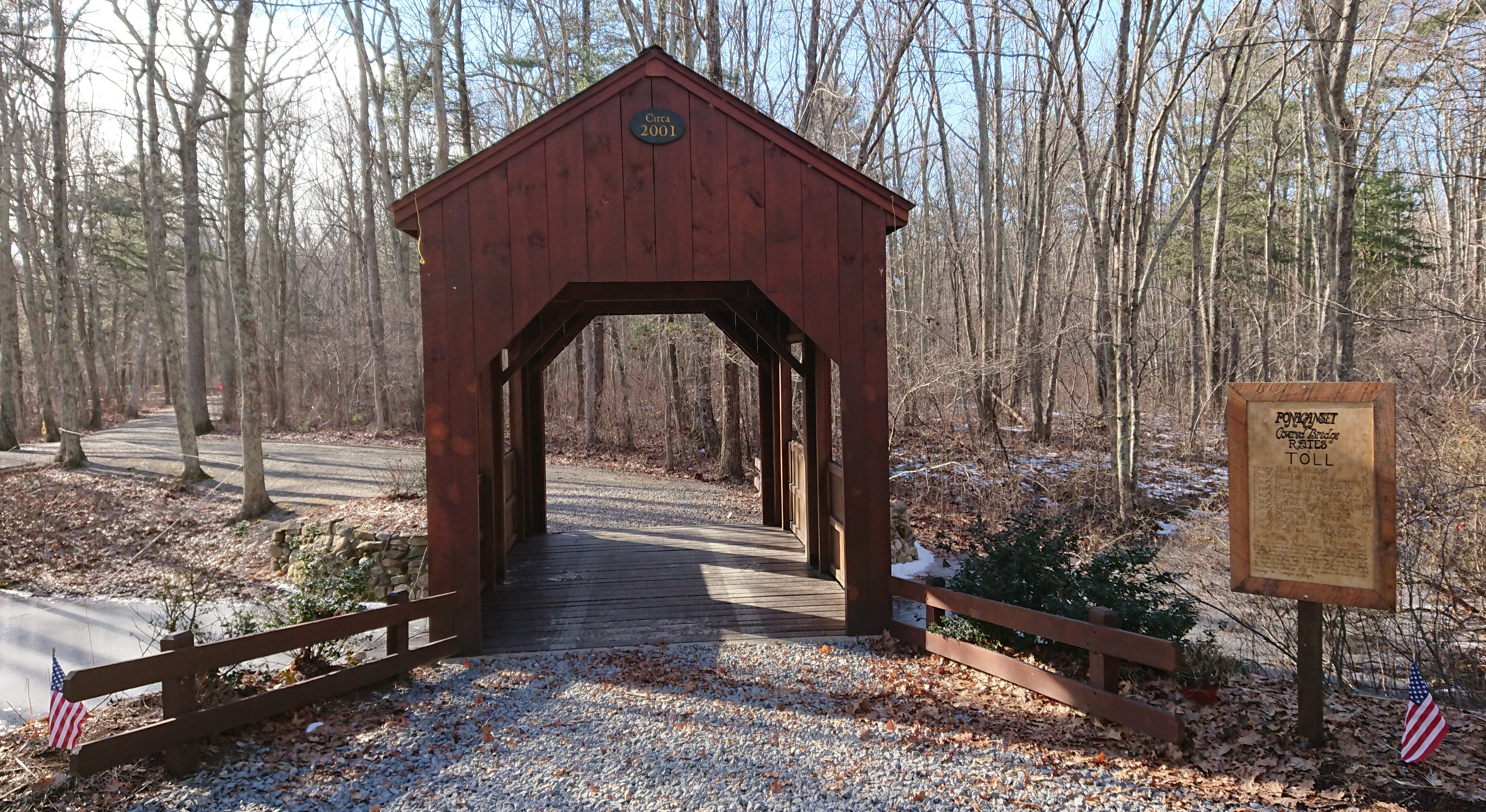
- Covered bridge near Ponaganset High School

- Flag Coat of arms
- Interactive map of Glocester
- Location of Glocester in Rhode Island Location in the United States Location in North America
- Coordinates: 41°53′27″N 71°41′26″W
- Country: United States
- State: Rhode Island
- County: Providence County
- Incorporated: February 20, 1731
- Named after: Henry Stuart, Duke of Gloucester

Government
  - Type: Town meeting
  - Town Council: Stephanie Calise Westgate (R); Walter M.O. Steere III (Vice President) (R); Johnathan E. Burlingame (R); William A. Worthy (President) (R); Cheryl Greathouse (R)
  - Deputy Town Clerk: Christine Mathieu
  - Town Clerk: Jean M. Fecteau (R)

Area
  - Total: 56.8 sq mi (147.2 km^{2})
  - Land: 54.8 sq mi (142.0 km^{2})
  - Water: 2.0 sq mi (5.2 km^{2})
- Elevation: 597 ft (182 m)

Population (2020)
  - Total: 9,974
  - Density: 182/sq mi (70.2/km^{2})
- Time zone: UTC−5 (Eastern (EST))
  - Summer (DST): UTC−4 (EDT)
- ZIP Codes: 02814 (Chepachet), 02829 (Harmony), 02857 (North Scituate)
- Area code: 401
- FIPS code: 44-30340
- GNIS feature ID: 1220070
- Website: www.glocesterri.gov

Glocester, otherwise officially called the Town of Glocester, Rhode Island, is a town in Providence County, Rhode Island, United States. The population was 9,974 as of the 2020 census. The villages of Chepachet and Harmony are in Glocester. Putnam Pike (U.S. Route 44) runs west through the town center of Glocester into Putnam, Connecticut.

== History ==
Glocester, originally named Gloucester for Henry Stuart, Duke of Gloucester, was a part of the City of Providence until 1731, when it had become an independent town within the State of Rhode Island. Northern Glocester would be incorporated as the Town of Burrillville in 1806, whilst at the same time, the residents of Gloucester had voted to change the spelling of the town name from Gloucester to Glocester in order to differentiate it from the City of Gloucester, Massachusetts, holding the same meaning as Glocester is a historical and alternative variant of the word of Gloucester.

During the American Revolution, Loyalists from Newport were exiled in Glocester to Stephen Keach's farm, including Thomas Vernon, a Tory from Newport, who described Glocester residents in 1776 as:

inclined much to talk of liberty...It is amazing what false and erroneous opinions and ideas these people have entertained...The religion of the people of this town consists entirely of New Light Baptists. The custom of Dipping is much in vogue in this and the neighboring towns.

Samuel Willard (physician) made rounds on smallpox victims in North Glocester during the late 18th century.

The Dorr Rebellion began in Glocester in 1841.

Since 1927 the Ancient and Horribles Parade has been an annual Fourth of July tradition in Chepachet, where residents create traditional and satirical political floats.

== Geography ==
According to the United States Census Bureau, the town has a total area of 56.8 square miles (147 km^{2}), of which 54.8 square miles (142 km^{2}) is land and 2.0 square miles (5.2 km^{2}) (3.55%) is water. Some bodies of water in Glocester include, Waterman Reservoir.

== Demographics ==
Historical population
Census	Pop.	Note	%±
1790	4,025		—
1800	4,009		−0.4%
1810	2,310		−42.4%
1820	2,504		8.4%
1830	2,521		0.7%
1840	2,304		−8.6%
1850	2,872		24.7%
1860	2,427		−15.5%
1870	2,385		−1.7%
1880	2,250		−5.7%
1890	2,095		−6.9%
1900	1,402		−33.1%
1910	1,404		0.1%
1920	1,389		−1.1%
1930	1,693		21.9%
1940	2,099		24.0%
1950	2,682		27.8%
1960	3,397		26.7%
1970	5,160		51.9%
1980	7,550		46.3%
1990	9,227		22.2%
2000	9,948		7.8%
2010	9,746		−2.0%
2020	9,974		2.3%
U.S. Decennial Census

As of the census of 2020, there were 9,974 people and 3,780 households in the town. The population density was 184.1 inhabitants per square mile (71.1/km^{2}). There were 4,213 housing units in the town. The racial makeup of the town was 92.56% White, 0.55% African American, 0.13% Native American, 0.65% Asian, 1.14% from other races, and 4.96% from two or more races. Hispanic or Latino of any race were 2.76% of the population.

There were 3,780 households, out of which 25.3% had children under the age of 18 living with them, 62.0% were married couples living together, 11.6% had a female householder with no spouse present, and 16.2% had a male householder with no spouse present. 13.0% of all households were made up of individuals, and 5.2% had someone living alone who was 65 years of age or older. The average household size was 2.65 and the average family size was 3.12.

In the town, the population was spread out, with 20.8% under the age of 18, 6.5% from 18 to 24, 19.2% from 25 to 44, 34.2% from 45 to 64, and 19.3% who were 65 years of age or older. The median age was 48.4 years.

The median income for a household in the town was $111,243, and the median income for a family was $120,417. The per capita income for the town was $46,846. About 2.9% of the population was below the poverty line, including 0.0% of those under age 18 and 6.2% of those age 65 or over.

== Education ==
Glocester is the home to both West Glocester Elementary School in West Glocester and the Fogarty Memorial School in Harmony. Students of both would attend both Ponaganset Middle School and Ponaganset High School for secondary education.

== Notable people ==
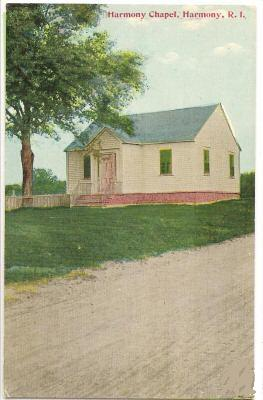
Harmony Chapel Cemetery on U.S. Route 44 around the start of the 20th century

- Charles J. Fogarty, Rhode Island state senator and 67th Lieutenant Governor of Rhode Island; lived in Glocester
- Ray Fogarty, Rhode Island state representative, lived in Glocester
- Paul Fogarty, Rhode Island politician; born in Glocester
- Charles H. Page, Rhode Island politician; born in Glocester
- Arthur Steere, businessman and Rhode Island state senator, born in Glocester

== National Historic Sites in Glocester ==
- Chepachet Village Historic District
- Cherry Valley Archeological Site, RI-279
- Glocester Town Pound (1748)
- Harmony Chapel and Cemetery (1816)
- Manton-Hunt-Farnum Farm (1793)
