= National Register of Historic Places listings in Cranston, Rhode Island =

This is a list of Registered Historic Places in Cranston, Rhode Island.

Contents: Counties in Rhode Island

Bristol | Kent | Newport | Providence (Pawtucket | Providence (city) | Woonsocket) | Washington

This National Park Service list is complete through NPS recent listings posted April 17, 2026.

	Name on the Register	Image	Date listed	Location	City or town	Description
1	Arkwright Bridge	Arkwright Bridge	December 12, 1978 (#78000061)	Crosses the Pawtuxet River at Hill St. 41°43′49″N 71°32′49″W	Cranston	Extends into Kent County
2	Edgewood Historic District-Anstis Greene Estate Plats	Edgewood Historic District-Anstis Greene Estate Plats	August 3, 2015 (#15000497)	Anstis, Broad & Swift Sts., Birchfield & Kensington Rds., Bluff, King, Marion & Rosewood Aves., Narragansett Blvd. 41°46′25″N 71°23′40″W	Cranston	
3	Edgewood Historic District-Arnold Farm Plat	Edgewood Historic District-Arnold Farm Plat	September 10, 2010 (#10000733)	Arnold, Albert, Columbia Aves.; parts of Broad St., Pawtuxet Ave., Narragansett Blvd. 41°46′38″N 71°23′44″W	Cranston	
4	Edgewood Historic District-Taft Estate Plat	Edgewood Historic District-Taft Estate Plat	October 24, 2003 (#03001069)	Roughly bounded by Windsor Rd., Narragansett Bay, Circuit Dr., and Broad St.; E. side of Narragansett Blvd. between Windsor Rd. & Ocean Ave. 41°46′14″N 71°23′27″W	Cranston	Second set of addresses represents a boundary increase, 2014-12-22
5	Edgewood Historic District-Shaw Plat	Edgewood Historic District-Shaw Plat	March 27, 2013 (#13000120)	Shaw and Marion Aves., parts of Narragansett Boulevard, and Broad St. 41°46′30″N 71°23′41″W	Cranston	
6	Edgewood Yacht Club	Edgewood Yacht Club	February 23, 1989 (#89000072)	3 Shaw Ave. 41°46′34″N 71°23′26″W	Cranston	
7	Thomas Fenner House	Thomas Fenner House	March 2, 1990 (#90000143)	43 Stony Acre Dr. 41°47′27″N 71°29′19″W	Cranston	
8	Furnace Hill Brook Historic and Archeological District	Furnace Hill Brook Historic and Archeological District	August 6, 1980 (#80000097)	off Furnace Hill Road; 41°45′20″N 71°29′15″W	Cranston	
9	Joy Homestead	Joy Homestead	February 18, 1971 (#71000035)	156 Scituate Ave. 41°46′57″N 71°28′36″W	Cranston	
10	Knightsville Meetinghouse	Knightsville Meetinghouse	March 8, 1978 (#78000074)	67 Phenix Ave. 41°46′54″N 71°28′08″W	Cranston	
11	Lippitt Hill Historic District	Lippitt Hill Historic District	March 2, 1989 (#89000142)	Hope Rd., Burlingame Rd., and Lippett Ave. 41°44′23″N 71°32′06″W	Cranston	
12	Norwood Avenue Historic District	Norwood Avenue Historic District	April 26, 2002 (#02000412)	Roughly along Norwood Ave. between Roger Williams to Broad St. 41°46′51″N 71°24′12″W	Cranston	Extends into Providence.
13	Oak Lawn Village Historic District	Oak Lawn Village Historic District	November 25, 1977 (#77000004)	Wilbur Ave. from Natick Rd. to Oaklawn Ave., includes Searle, Exchange, and Wheelock Sts. 41°44′57″N 71°29′06″W	Cranston	
14	Pawtuxet Village Historic District	Pawtuxet Village Historic District	April 24, 1973 (#73000050)	Bounded roughly by Bayside, S. Atlantic, and Ocean Aves., the Pawtuxet and Providence rivers, and Post Rd. 41°45′49″N 71°23′27″W	Cranston	
15	Potter-Remington House		December 28, 1978 (#78000006)	571 Natick Rd. 41°44′30″N 71°29′35″W	Cranston	
16	Rhodes-on-the Pawtuxet Ballroom and Gazebo	Rhodes-on-the Pawtuxet Ballroom and Gazebo	December 12, 1978 (#78000007)	Rhodes Pl. 41°46′04″N 71°23′32″W	Cranston	
17	Rosedale Apartments	Rosedale Apartments	April 10, 2007 (#07000301)	1180 Narragansett Boulevard; 41°46′57″N 71°23′34″W	Cranston	
18	Sheldon House	Sheldon House	January 5, 1989 (#88001123)	458 Scituate Ave. 41°46′47″N 71°29′33″W	Cranston	
19	Gov. William Sprague Mansion	Gov. William Sprague Mansion	February 18, 1971 (#71000002)	1351 Cranston St. 41°47′28″N 71°27′24″W	Cranston	
20	Westcote	Westcote	August 3, 1988 (#88001126)	101 Mountain Laurel Dr. 41°45′19″N 71°28′21″W	Cranston	
21	Nathan Westcott House	Nathan Westcott House	January 5, 1989 (#88001124)	150 Scituate Ave. 41°46′42″N 71°28′46″W	Cranston	
22	Arad Wood House	Arad Wood House	August 3, 1988 (#88001125)	407 Pontiac Ave. 41°46′30″N 71°26′18″W	Cranston	

== See also ==
- National Register of Historic Places listings in Providence County, Rhode Island
- List of National Historic Landmarks in Rhode Island
