= Edgewood Historic District–Sally Greene Homestead Plats =

Historic district in Rhode Island, United States

- U.S. National Register of Historic Places
- U.S. Historic district
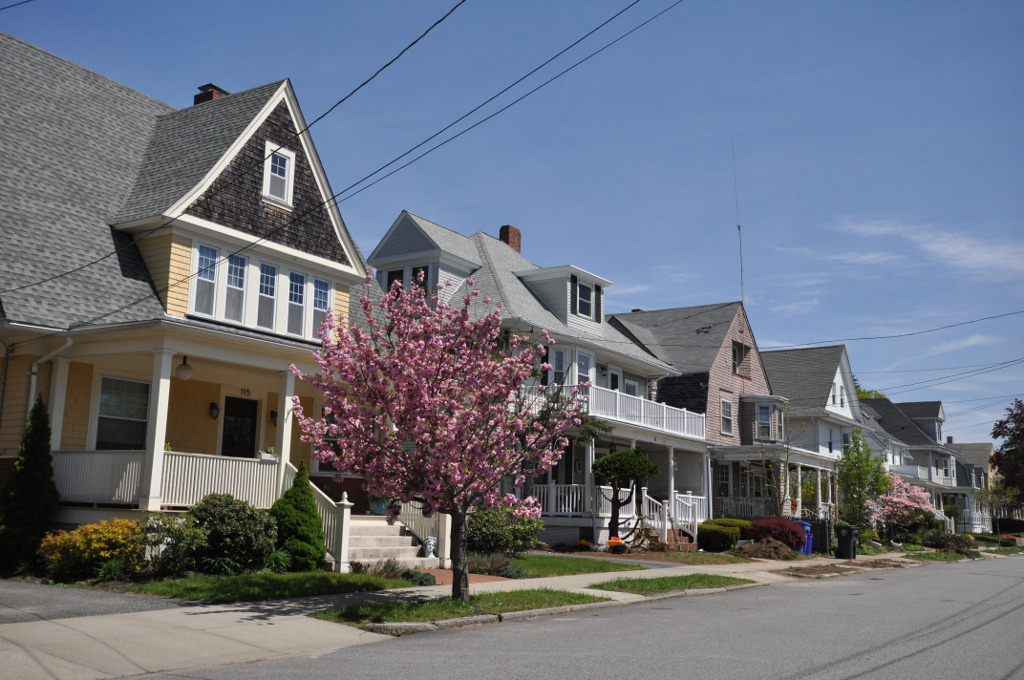

- Location within Rhode Island Location within the United States
- Location: Fairview and Glen Aves., Harbour Terr., Hudson Pl., Massasoit Ave., and portions of Broad St. & Narragansett Blvd., Cranston, Rhode Island
- Coordinates: 41.772675°N 71.392016°W
- Area: 22 acres (8.9 ha)
- NRHP reference No.: 16000787
- Added to NRHP: November 22, 2016

The Edgewood Historic District–Sally Greene Homestead Plats is a residential historic district in the Edgewood neighborhood of eastern Cranston, Rhode Island. Bounded by Glen Avenue to the north, Broad Street to the west, Massasoit Street to the south, and the Providence River to the east, this area was developed between 1900 and 1963 as a streetcar suburb for middle and lower middle class residents on what was once a country estate. The district was listed on the National Register of Historic Places in 2016.

== Description and history ==
The Sally Greene Homestead Plats area was in the 18th century a landholding of one of Cranston's most prominent families, the Rhodeses. Sally Rhodes Remington Greene inherited the southern third of the family's coastal properties in 1801. This property was purchased in 1869 by Edward Taft, a textile manufacturer who owned an adjacent country estate just to the south. By that time, Broad Street to the west was served by a streetcar line, running between Pawtuxet village to the south and downtown Providence to the north. He promptly resold it to other interests, but eventually repurchasing some parts of it for development. Over a period spanning from 1897 to 1936, the area of the Sally Greene Homestead was platted out for development, which took place roughly from 1900 to 1963.

The district's northernmost street is Glen Avenue, where it abuts the Anstis Greene Estate Plats historic district to the north, and is bounded on the south by Massasoit Street, where it abuts the Aberdeen Plat historic district. The house lots in the district are small, ranging in size from 4,000 to 6,000 square feet, although due to irregularities in the terrain, some lots near the water are larger, ranging in size up to 15,000 square feet and commanding views of the waterfront. Most of the houses are between one and 2 1/2 stories in height and of wood-frame construction, although there are a few houses where brick or stucco has been applied to the exterior. Stylistically they are diverse, representing styles popular at their time of construction. Setbacks from the street are typically moderate, with small yard spaces on all sides. The only non-residential property is a single commercial building on Broad Street. One 19th-century structure, a barn, is a rare reminder of the area's agrarian past.

== See also ==
- National Register of Historic Places listings in Providence County, Rhode Island
