= Edgewood Historic District–Shaw Plat =

Historic district in Rhode Island, United States

- U.S. National Register of Historic Places
- U.S. Historic district
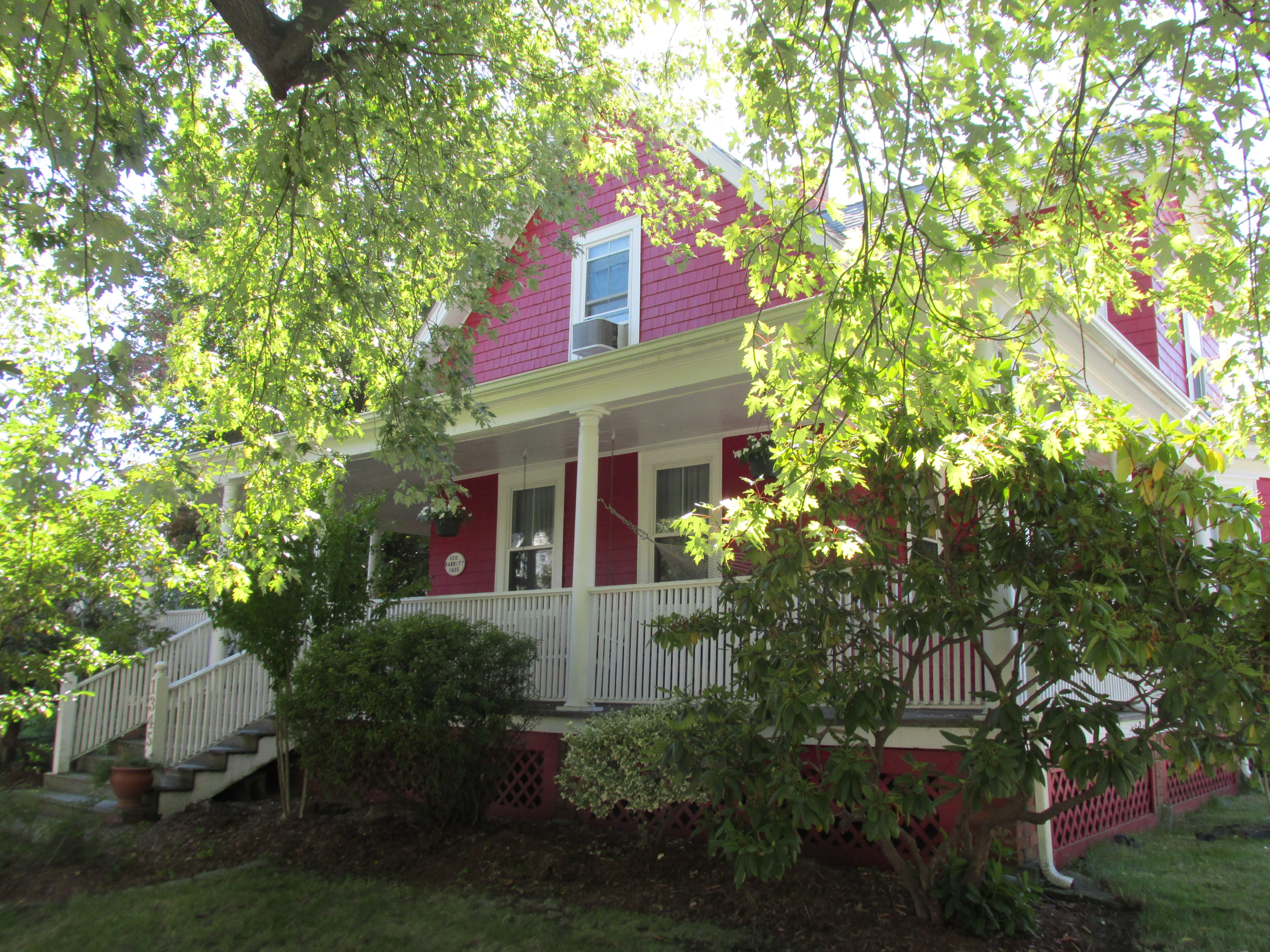

- Location within Rhode Island Location within the United States
- Location: Shaw and Marion Aves., parts of Narragansett Boulevard, and Broad St., Cranston, Rhode Island
- Coordinates: 41.7751°N 71.3945°W
- Area: 25 acres (10 ha)
- NRHP reference No.: 13000120
- Added to NRHP: March 27, 2013

The Edgewood Historic District–Shaw Plat is a residential historic district in the Edgewood neighborhood of northeastern Cranston, Rhode Island. It is bounded by Broad Street on the west, Marion Avenue on the south (abutting the Edgewood Historic District-Anstis Greene Estate Plats), and Narragansett Bay on the east; it consists of the properties that line the parallel streets, Shaw and Marion Avenues, and the short section of Narragansett Boulevard that runs between Shaw and Marion Avenues. On the north, it abuts the separately-listed Edgewood Historic District–Arnold Farm Plat. The area was platted out between 1867 and 1895, with the construction of most of its housing taking place between 1867 and the start of World War II, with the most construction going on between 1895 and 1930. The district also includes the previously listed Edgewood Yacht Club. In 1853, the 25 acres of land that became the Shaw Plat was sold to Allen Shaw of Providence for $3,660.

The district was listed on the National Register of Historic Places in 2013.

Most of the houses in the 25-acre district were built between 1880 and 1962, with the prevailing architectural types and styles being Queen Anne, Shingle, Colonial Revival, Bungalow, Four-Square, Dutch Colonial, English Cottage, Garrison Colonial, Ranch and Modern.

== See also ==
- National Register of Historic Places listings in Providence County, Rhode Island
