= Division Street Bridge (Rhode Island) =

- U.S. National Register of Historic Places
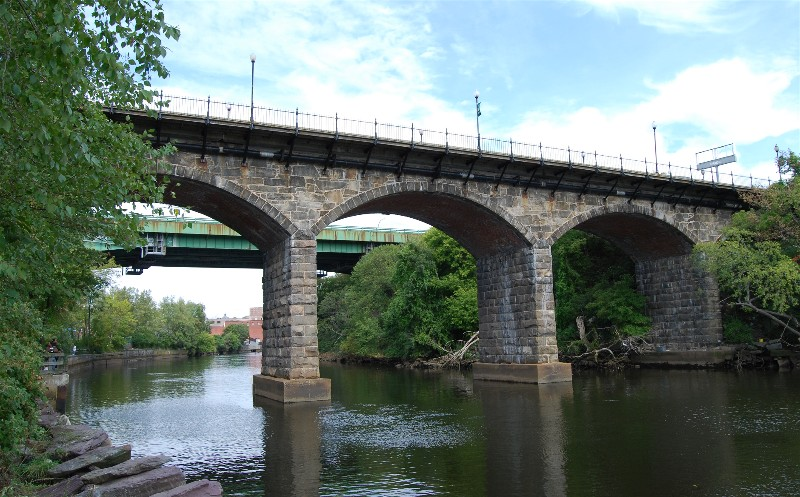
- Division Street Bridge in 2008; old I-95 Pawtucket River Bridge noted in the rear

- Location within Rhode Island Location within the United States
- Location: Pawtucket, Rhode Island, US
- Coordinates: 41°52′20″N 71°23′6″W
- Built: 1876
- Architect: Cushing & Co., Horace Foster
- MPS: Pawtucket MRA
- NRHP reference No.: 83003810
- Added to NRHP: November 18, 1983

The Division Street Bridge is an historic roadway and sidewalk stone arch bridge in Pawtucket, Rhode Island, United States, carrying Division Street over the Seekonk River. The structure was built in 1875–1877 at a cost of USD95,000. It is a nine-span stone and brick bridge with a total length of about 450 feet (140 m), making it the "finest and longest" stone arch bridge in the state. It is said to be a symbolic icon of the unity of the two neighborhoods, which are divided by the river, coming together as the Town of Pawtucket. The bridge was listed on the National Register of Historic Places in 1983. Although it may be "functionally obsolete" relative to traffic patterns and in need of repairs, it is considered to be architecturally and historically significant.

== Design ==
The Division Street Bridge is a nine-span stone and brick structure, with a total length of about 450 feet (140 m). (Note: As the NRHP application noted: "The bridge is located "over Taft Street and the’ Seekonk River one-third of a mile below Pawtucket Falls. The bridge’s nine segmental arches each have an approximate 50-foot span, and each rises roughly 12 feet above its springing points; the six shore arches four on the western bank, two on the eastern have spans of approximately 40 feet and rises of only about 10 feet. The height of the road bed above the mean water level of the Seekonk River is roughly 45 feet.") Each of its spans consists of a segmented arch of about 50 feet (15 m) in length. The road bed is 27 feet (8.2 m) wide, and there are 7-foot (2.1 m) sidewalks on either side. The mean height of the bridge above the water is 45 feet (14 m). The piers of the bridge are constructed of coursed granite ashlar and the voussoirs are dressed granite with single keystones. The spandrels, the space between the arches, are filled with mortared granite rubble, and the arch barrels are constructed with an estimated 550,000 bricks. The original roadway was made of granite blocks, the seams of which were filled with tar, but this has been modified with modern asphalt paving and with the piers being modified with the addition of reinforced concrete sheathing for the river piers. The iron walkways, produced by Crowell and Sisson, project over both the sides of the bridge with iron brackets.

Constructed from 1875 to 1877 at a cost of USD95,000, the details of the bridge's construction and its architect are unknown. A contemporary account states that the need for the bridge was first proposed in 1871, but it wasn't until a town meeting on March 1, 1875, that it would be decided upon in a vote. A commission to oversee the project included C. B. Farnsworth, William T. Adams, and William R. Walker, and the contract was awarded to Horace Foster. (Note: Another source also credits Foster as the designer. "So strong and hard-wearing this bridge is that it stood for over a hundred years without needing rehabilitation until the year 1985. Credit for this functional and at the same time artistically designed transportation structure belongs to Horace Foster, who made it beautiful using granite, stone and bricks.") A local architect, William R. Walker was on the town's committee, but his role in the design or appearance of the bridge is unknown. Other figures involved in the construction of the bridge include Cushing and Company, later known as Cushing and Shedd, consulting engineers, and Horace Foster was the general contractor. Though it originally began as a contract for US$71,000, the bridge would increase in costs to US$95,000 due to the changes that were made. The granite was sourced from the towns of Sterling, Connecticut, and Westerly, Rhode Island. Repairs for the bridge listed in the 1906 annual report recorded US$15.82 for unspecified work. Though listed as only a footnote, repairs to the bridge were made in 1918.

== Current state ==
The Division Street Bridge was last rehabilitated in 1985, but it remains open under no restrictions after its inspection in May 2012. Data from the National Bridge Inventory lists the superstructure and substructure as in fair condition. The scour condition is critical, but the recommended work is rehabilitation of the structure. (Note: According to 2014 reports: "Bank is beginning to slump. River control devices and embankment protection have widespread minor damage. There is minor stream bed movement evident. Debris is restricting the channel slightly... Bridge is scour critical; bridge foundations determined to be unstable.")

The report estimates the cost of repairs to be US$9,834,000. A collection of reports dating back to 1995 lists the bridge as "functionally obsolete" for its current traffic requirements. A 2006 traffic report listed the bridge as carrying 21,900 vehicles daily. In 2007 the historic bridge saw an increase in traffic, as a heavy truck detour during the reconstruction of the nearby I-95 Pawtucket Bridge. In 2012, the Pawtucket River Bridge reopened without weight restrictions to northbound traffic. The Division Street Bridge is used as part of a detour in the event of closure of the I-95 Pawtucket River bridge.

Loads on the route which goes over the bridge have twice been reduced, and are now limited to 18 tons to help preserve the bridge.

== Significance ==
The Division Street Bridge is architecturally significant as the longest stone arch bridge in Rhode Island and historically significant as a symbolic gesture to link and unify the two rapidly growing neighborhoods on Pawtucket Falls under the newly formed Town of Pawtucket. The bridge was listed on the National Register of Historic Places in 1983.

== See also ==
- List of bridges on the National Register of Historic Places in Rhode Island
- National Register of Historic Places listings in Pawtucket, Rhode Island
