= List of bridges on the National Register of Historic Places in Rhode Island =

This is a list of bridges and tunnels on the National Register of Historic Places in the U.S. state of Rhode Island.

Name	Image	Built	Listed	Location	County	Type
Arkwright Bridge		1888	1978-12-12	Cranston, West Warwick; 41°43′49″N 71°32′49″W	Kent, Providence	Phoenix column;Pratt Truss
Boston and Providence Railroad Bridge		1884	1980-11-28	East Providence; 41°50′5″N 71°21′45″W	Providence	
Division Street Bridge		1876	1983-11-18	Pawtucket; 41°52′20″N 71°23′6″W	Providence	Stone Arch
Interlaken Mill Bridge		ca. 1885	1978-12-22	Coventry; 41°43′41″N 71°32′39″W	Kent	Believed to be the only lenticular pony truss bridge in the state.
Main Street Bridge	Main Street Bridge	1858	1983-11-18	Pawtucket; 41°52′35″N 71°23′2″W	Providence	Double Stone Arch
Mount Hope Bridge		1927, 1929	1976-01-31	Bristol, Portsmouth; 41°38′23″N 71°15′29″W	Bristol, Newport	Triple Span Steel Suspension
