= Main Street Bridge (Pawtucket, Rhode Island) =

- U.S. National Register of Historic Places
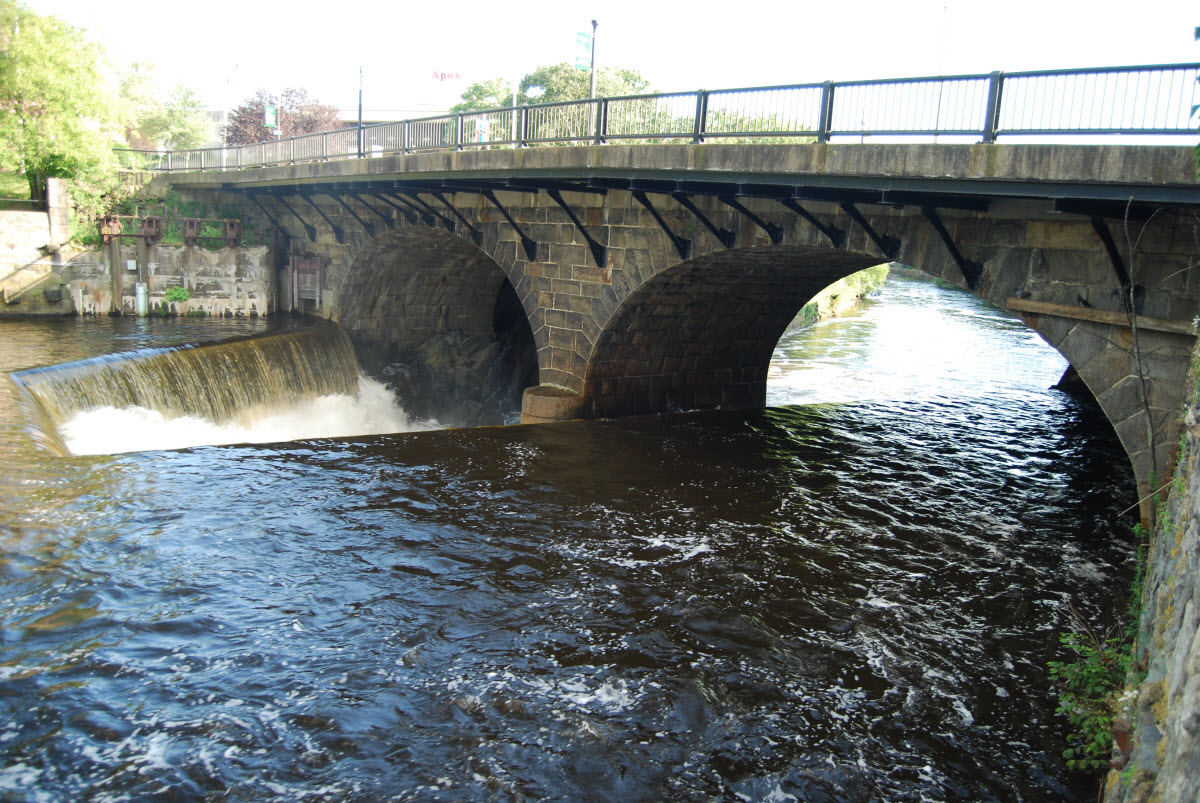

- Location within Rhode Island Location within the United States
- Location: Pawtucket, Rhode Island
- Coordinates: 41°52′35″N 71°23′2″W
- Built: 1858
- Architect: Samuel Cushing, Luther Kingsley
- MPS: Pawtucket MRA
- NRHP reference No.: 83003832
- Added to NRHP: November 18, 1983

The Main Street Bridge is an historic bridge carrying Main Street over the Pawtucket Falls in Pawtucket, Rhode Island. The oldest portion of this bridge consists of two flattened-arch spans, each about 40 feet (12 m) in length, with a total bridge length of 110 feet (34 m). The bridge has been widened twice to accommodate increased traffic; the most recent widening was in the 1960s, when concrete abutments were added to the south, and the added section completed with I-beams. The bridge, built in 1858, is believed to be the oldest highway bridge in active use in the state.

The bridge was listed on the National Register of Historic Places in 1983.

== See also ==
- National Register of Historic Places listings in Pawtucket, Rhode Island
- List of bridges on the National Register of Historic Places in Rhode Island
