= Edgewood Historic District–Aberdeen Plat =

Historic district in Rhode Island, United States

- U.S. National Register of Historic Places
- U.S. Historic district
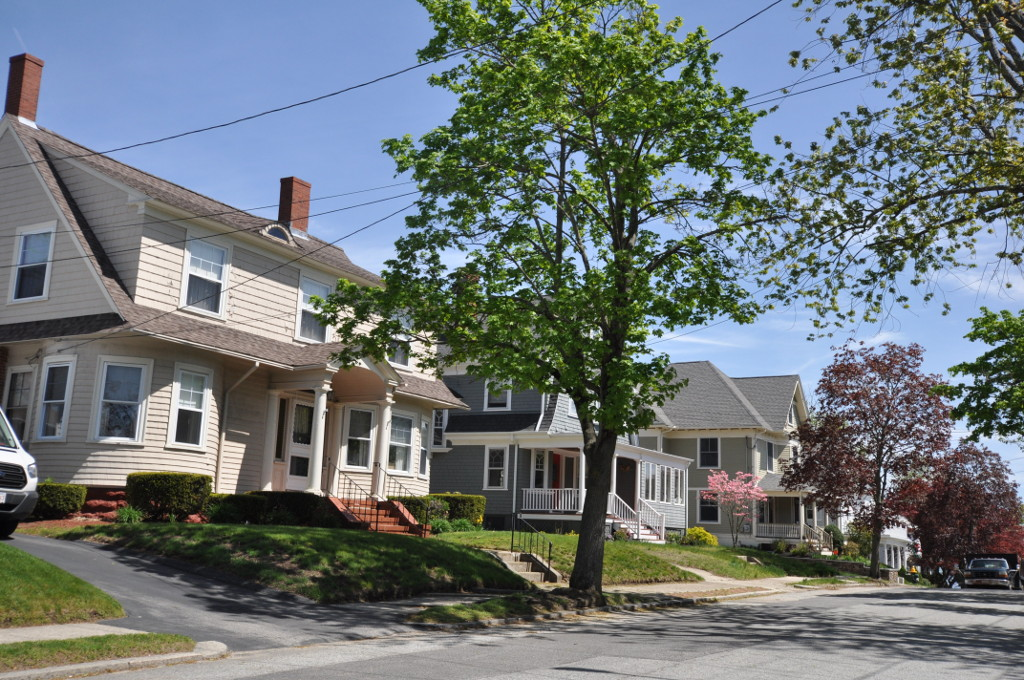

- Location within Rhode Island Location within the United States
- Location: Berwick Ln., Chiswick Rd., Strathmore Place and Road, portions of Broad St., and Narragansett Blvd., Cranston, Rhode Island
- Coordinates: 41.770379°N 71.392584°W
- Area: 27 acres (11 ha)
- NRHP reference No.: 16000833
- Added to NRHP: November 22, 2016

The Edgewood Historic District–Aberdeen Plat is a residential historic district in the Edgewood neighborhood of eastern Cranston, Rhode Island. Bounded by Berwick Lane and Sefton Drive to the north, Broad Street to the west, Chiswick Road to the south, and the Providence River to the east, this area was developed between 1901 and 1957 as a streetcar suburb for middle and upper middle class residents on what was once a country estate. The district was listed on the National Register of Historic Places in 2016.

== Description and history ==
The Aberdeen Plat was in the second half of the 19th century part of the country estate of Orray Taft, a prominent local businessman. His son Edward gave the city the eastern strip of this estate for the formation of what is now Narragansett Boulevard and Stillman Cove Park. By that time, Broad Street to the west was served by a streetcar line, running between Pawtuxet village to the south and downtown Providence to the north. The area just north of the Taft estate was being developed into residential streetcar suburb by the later 19th century. The rest of the Aberdeen Plat was acquired in several parcels by William M. Rhodes from the estate of Edward Taft in 1901. Rhodes formed the Aberdeen Land Company in 1902, which oversaw the area's subdivision and development.

The district is bounded on the north by Berwick Lane and Sefton Drive, where it abuts the Edgewood Historic District-Sally Greene Homestead Plats historic district, and is bounded on the south by the centerline of Chiswick Road. The house lots in the district are slightly larger than those of some of the plats to the north, ranging in size from 6,000 to 8,000 square feet. Most of the houses are between one and 2-1/2 stories in height and of wood frame construction, although there are a few houses where brick or stucco has been applied to the exterior. Setbacks from the street are typically moderate, and the lots are wide enough to include side yards and space for garages, which in some cases were added later. The only non-residential properties are a single commercial building on Broad Street, and the portions of Stillhouse Cove Park which fall within the district boundaries.

== See also ==
- National Register of Historic Places listings in Providence County, Rhode Island
