= Joy Homestead =

Historic house in Rhode Island

- U.S. National Register of Historic Places
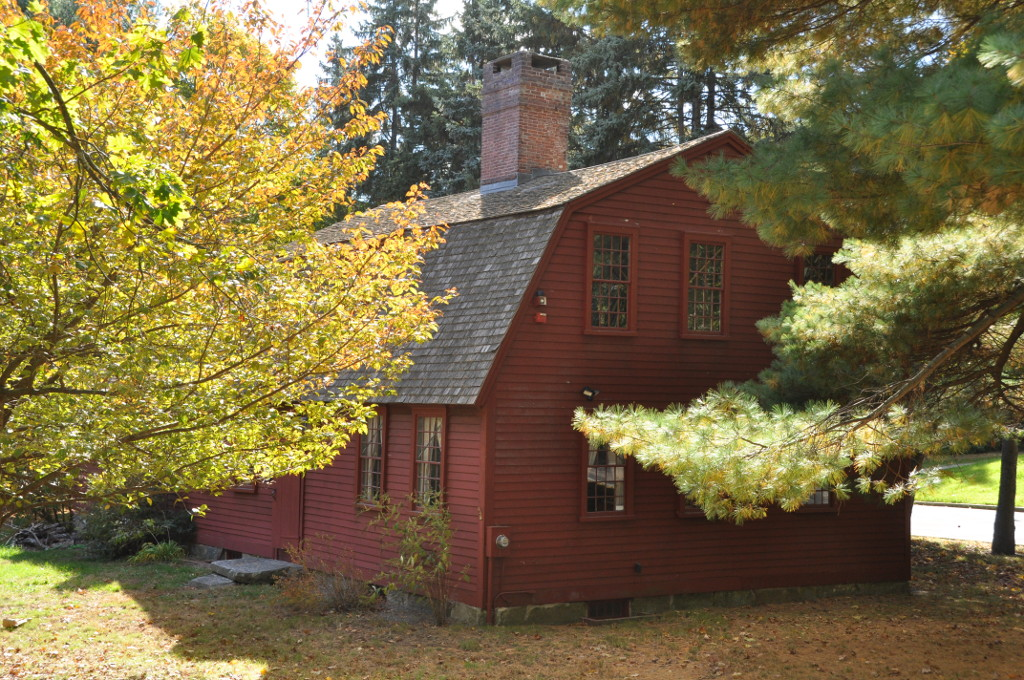

- Location within Rhode Island Location within the United States
- Location: Cranston, Rhode Island
- Coordinates: 41°46′57″N 71°28′36″W
- Built: 1764
- NRHP reference No.: 71000035
- Added to NRHP: February 18, 1971

The Joy Homestead, also known as the Job Joy House, is a historic house on Old Scituate Avenue in Cranston, Rhode Island. This 2 1/2-story gambrel-roof wood-framed house was built between 1764 and 1778. It was occupied by members of the Joy family until 1884, and was acquired by the Cranston Historical Society in 1959. It was a stopping point on the first day's march in 1781 of the French Army troops marching from Providence to Yorktown, Virginia during the American Revolutionary War.

The house was listed on the National Register of Historic Places in 1971. The Historical Society offers tours.

== See also ==
- Nathan Westcott House, another 18th-century house next door
- National Register of Historic Places listings in Providence County, Rhode Island
