= Nathan Westcott House =

Historic house in Rhode Island, United States

- U.S. National Register of Historic Places
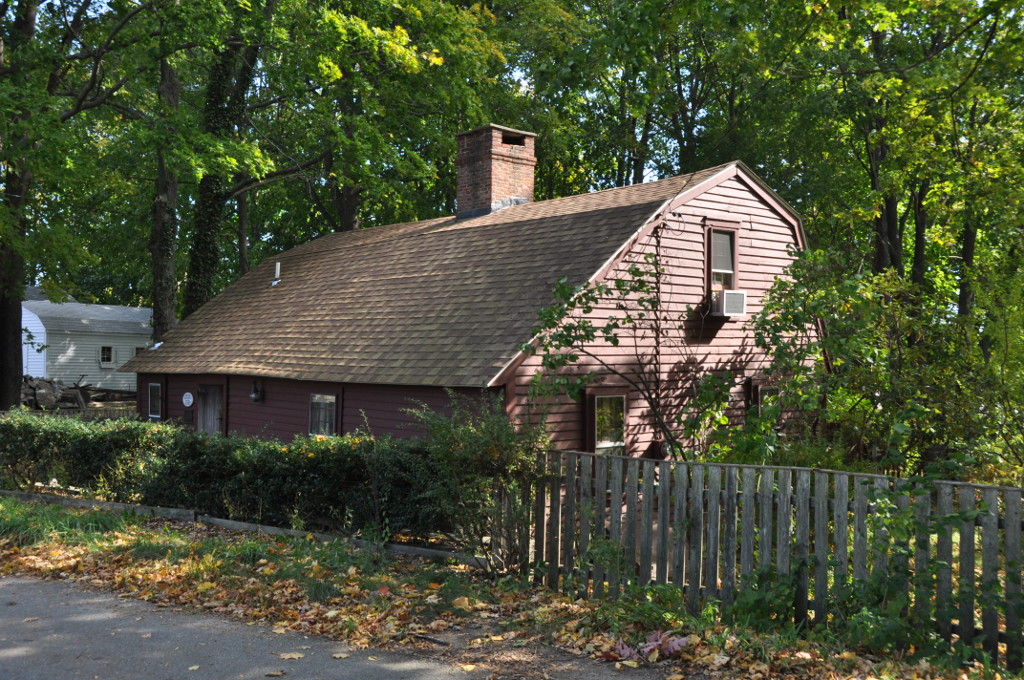

- Location within Rhode Island Location within the United States
- Location: 150 Scituate Avenue, Cranston, Rhode Island
- Coordinates: 41°46′42″N 71°28′46″W
- Built: 1770
- Architectural style: Colonial
- NRHP reference No.: 88001124
- Added to NRHP: January 5, 1989

The Nathan Westcott House is a historic house in Cranston, Rhode Island. This 1 1/2-story gambrel-roofed wood-frame house was built c. 1770 as a "half house", and extended about 20 years later, based on architectural evidence. The house was probably built by Nathan Westcott, a member of the locally prominent Westcott family, whose progenitor was among the area's early settlers. The house was later owned by the Joy family, whose homestead stands next door.

The house was listed on the National Register of Historic Places in 1989.

== See also ==
- National Register of Historic Places listings in Providence County, Rhode Island
