= Arkwright Bridge =

- U.S. National Register of Historic Places
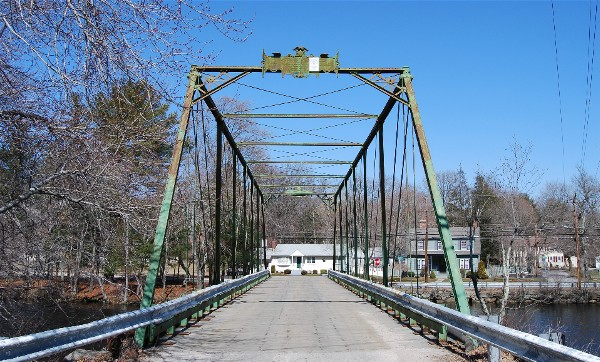
- Arkwright Bridge

- Location within Rhode Island Location within the United States
- Nearest city: Coventry, Rhode Island
- Coordinates: 41°43′49″N 71°32′49″W
- Built: 1888
- Architect: Dean & Westbrook
- Architectural style: Pratt Truss
- NRHP reference No.: 78000061
- Added to NRHP: December 12, 1978

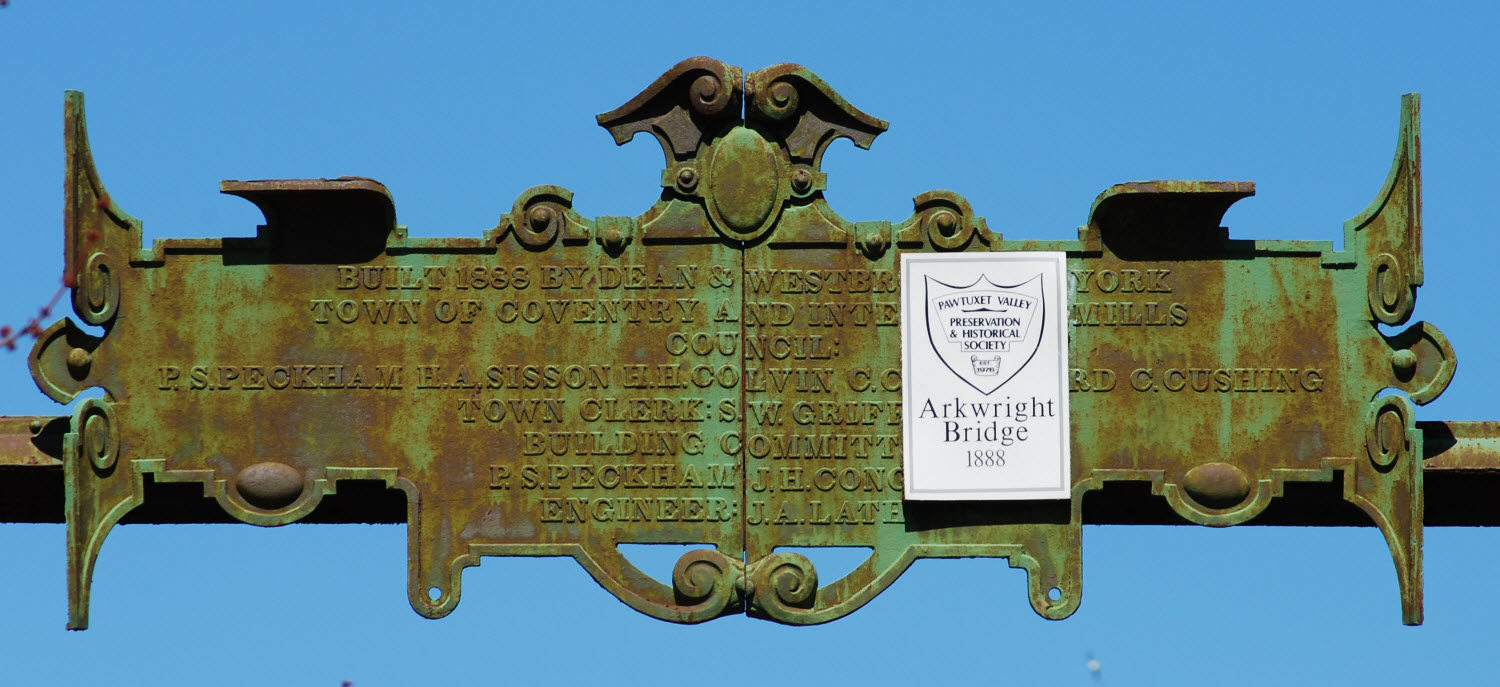
Historic Arkwright Bridge plaque

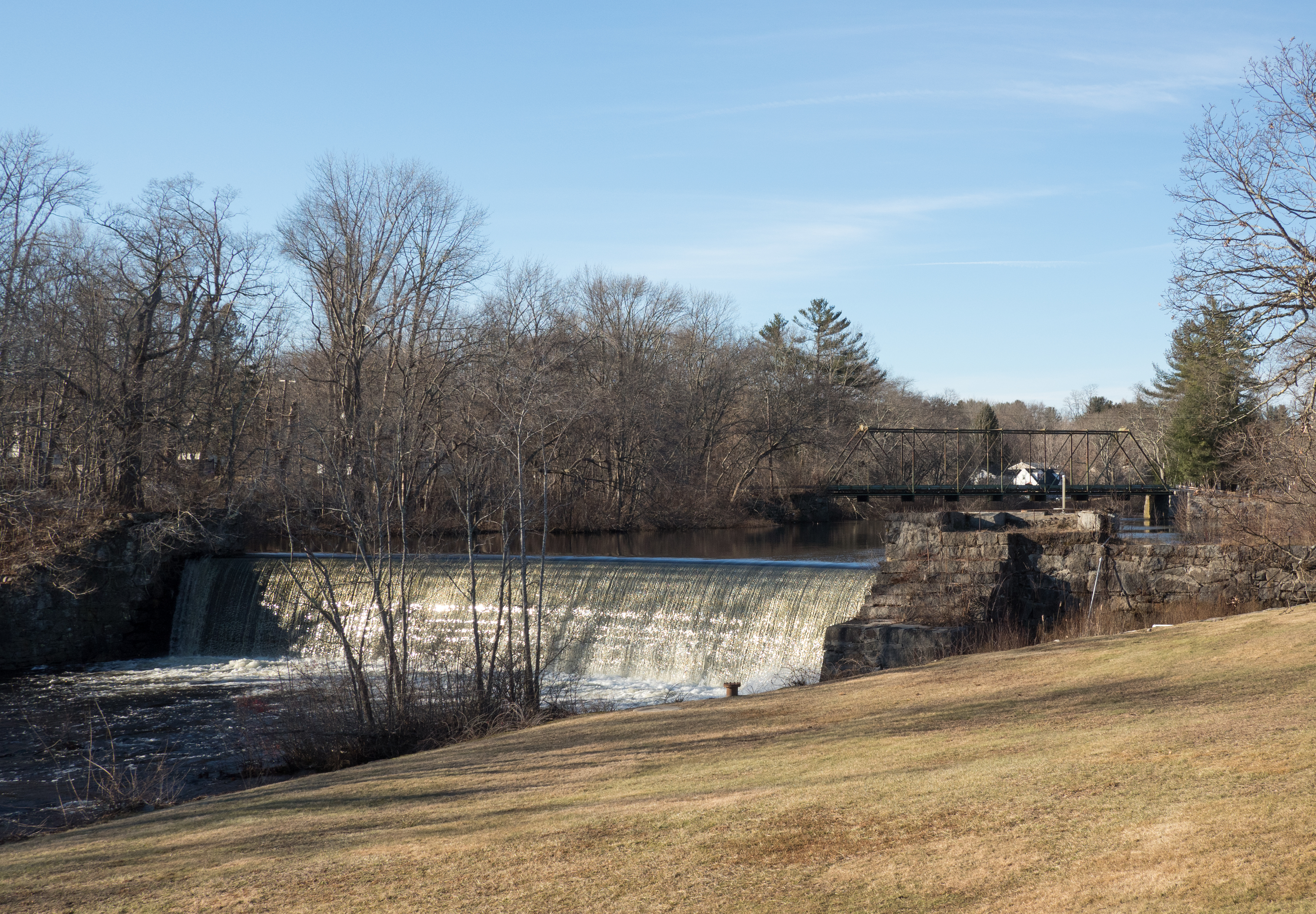
Arkwright Bridge over the Pawtuxet River in 2018

The Arkwright Bridge is an abandoned historic bridge formerly carrying Hill Street over the Pawtuxet River in the Arkwright mill village in central Rhode Island. The river forms the border between Cranston and Coventry.

The first bridge to span the Pawtuxet River at this location was an early nineteenth century wooden bridge, located in the city of Cranston. In 1887, a special resolution was passed changing the Coventry-Cranston border to the Pawtuxet River. A new iron bridge was commissioned in 1888 by a joint building committee from both Coventry and Cranston and the responsibility for maintenance of the new bridge was to be shared by both municipalities.

The bridge was built in 1888 by Dean & Westbrook for the Town of Coventry and the Interlaken Mills (later known as the Arkwright Mills). It is the longest surviving 19th century truss bridge in Rhode Island, and was added to the National Register of Historic Places in 1978.

The bridge is 128 feet, 6 inches long; 19 feet, 7 inches wide; and has and a depth of truss of 21 feet. The bridge is a single-span, through Pratt truss, built using Phoenix columns.

In 2004, there was a proposal to move the Arkwright Bridge to another location along the Pawtuxet River along the border of West Warwick, Rhode Island to be part of a proposed West Warwick Riverwalk. The bridge was ultimately not moved.

The Rhode Island Department of Transportation recommended closure of the locally owned bridge, and following an inspection, determined that the weight limit should be reduced to less than 3 tons from the previous 5 tons. Both communities closed the 123-year-old span on Friday, September 30, 2011. The bridge continues to be a popular jumping and swimming spot for local youth, with approximately 12 feet of air and an average 15 feet of water. The bridge was closed to pedestrians in 2011 due to infrastructure budget cuts, and has remained inactive and abandoned by both towns ever since.

== See also ==
- National Register of Historic Places listings in Providence County, Rhode Island
- National Register of Historic Places listings in Kent County, Rhode Island
- List of bridges on the National Register of Historic Places in Rhode Island
