= Edgewood Historic District–Anstis Greene Estate Plats =

Historic district in Rhode Island, United States

- Edgewood Historic District–Anstis Greene Estate Plat
- U.S. National Register of Historic Places
- U.S. Historic district
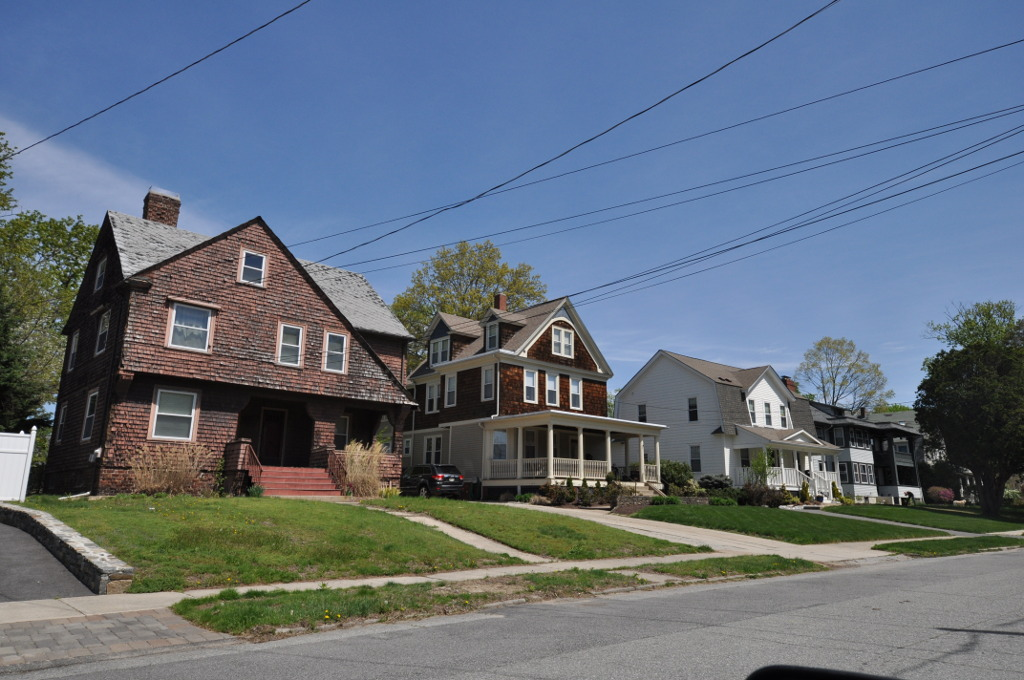

- Location within Rhode Island Location within the United States
- Location: Anstis, Broad & Swift Sts., Birchfield & Kensington Rds., Bluff, King, Marion & Rosewood Aves., Narragansett Blvd., Cranston, Rhode Island
- Coordinates: 41.7738°N 71.3943°W
- Area: 34 acres (14 ha)
- NRHP reference No.: 15000497
- Added to NRHP: August 3, 2015

The Edgewood Historic District–Anstis Greene Estate Plat is a residential historic district in the Edgewood neighborhood of eastern Cranston, Rhode Island. The 34-acre (14 ha) area is bounded on the west by Broad Street, the east by Narragansett Bay, the south by Rosewood Avenue, and on the north by Marion Avenue, where it abuts the Edgewood Historic District-Shaw Plat. The area, originally part of a much larger property belonging to Zachariah Rhodes in the 17th century, was platted for residential development in the decades following the arrival of the streetcar on Broad Street, providing commuter service to Providence. The land was willed by Anstis Rhodes Greene to a group of heirs, who progressively developed their individual portions. The only significant surviving elements that predate this development are two small family cemeteries.

The district was listed on the National Register of Historic Places in 2015.

== See also ==
- National Register of Historic Places listings in Providence County, Rhode Island
