= Edgewood Historic District–Arnold Farm Plat =

Historic district in Rhode Island, United States

- U.S. National Register of Historic Places
- U.S. Historic district
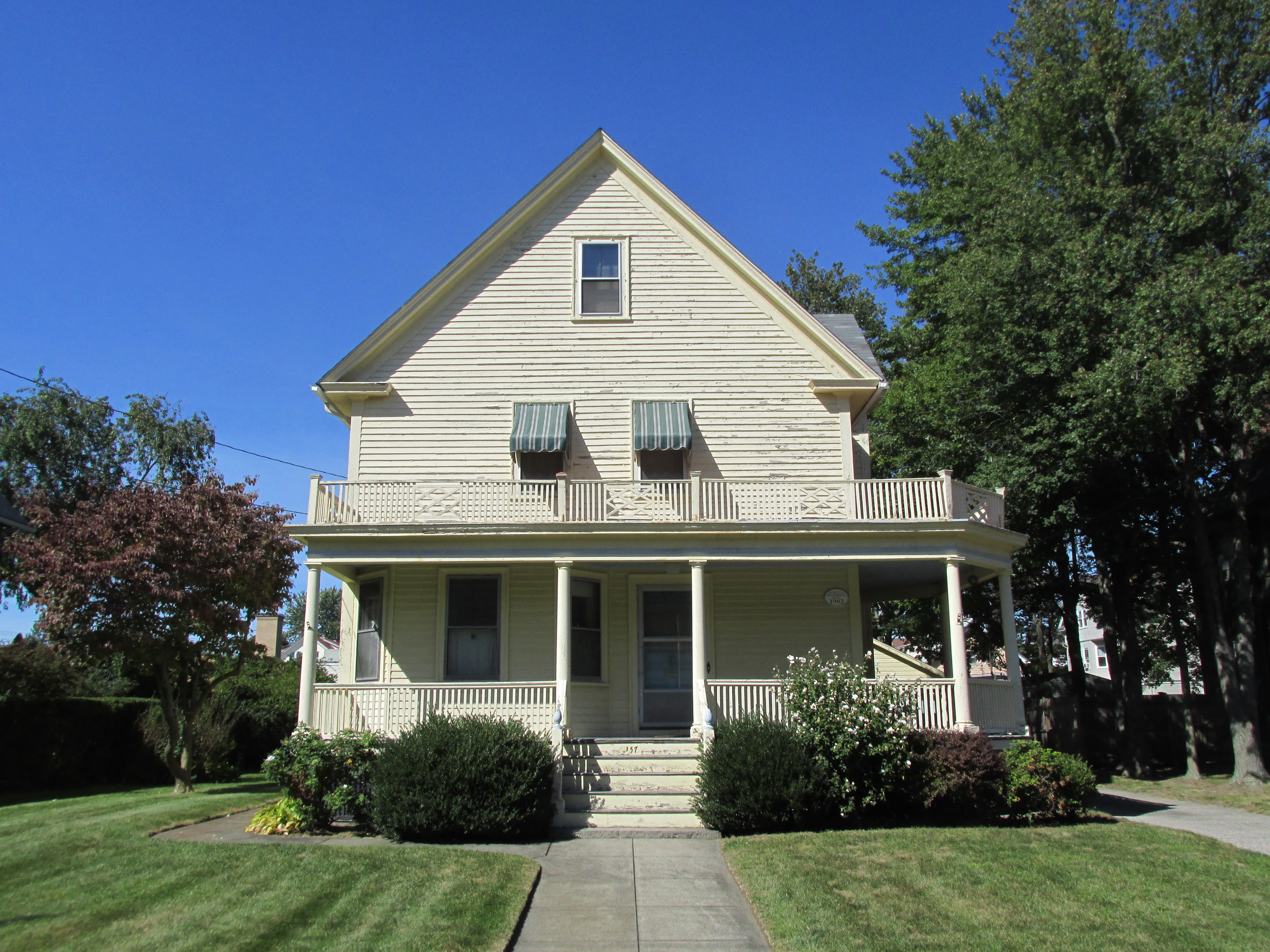

- Location within Rhode Island Location within the United States
- Location: Arnold, Albert, Columbia Aves.; parts of Broad St., Pawtuxet Ave., Narragansett Blvd., Cranston, Rhode Island
- Coordinates: 41.777222°N 71.395556°W
- Area: 38 acres (15 ha)
- NRHP reference No.: 10000733
- Added to NRHP: September 10, 2010

The Edgewood Historic District–Arnold Farm Plat is a residential historic district in the Edgewood neighborhood of eastern Cranston, Rhode Island. It is bounded on the north by Albert Avenue, on the east by Narragansett Bay, on the south by Columbia Avenue, and on the west by Broad Street. The district was primarily built out as a streetcar suburb of Providence between 1890 and 1930, and feature styles from Queen Anne and Colonial Revival to Dutch Colonials and two- and three-decker multiunit houses. Prior to its development, the area had been farmed by several generations of the Arnold family.

The district was listed on the National Register of Historic Places in 2010.

== See also ==
- National Register of Historic Places listings in Providence County, Rhode Island
