= 19th-century turnpikes in Rhode Island =

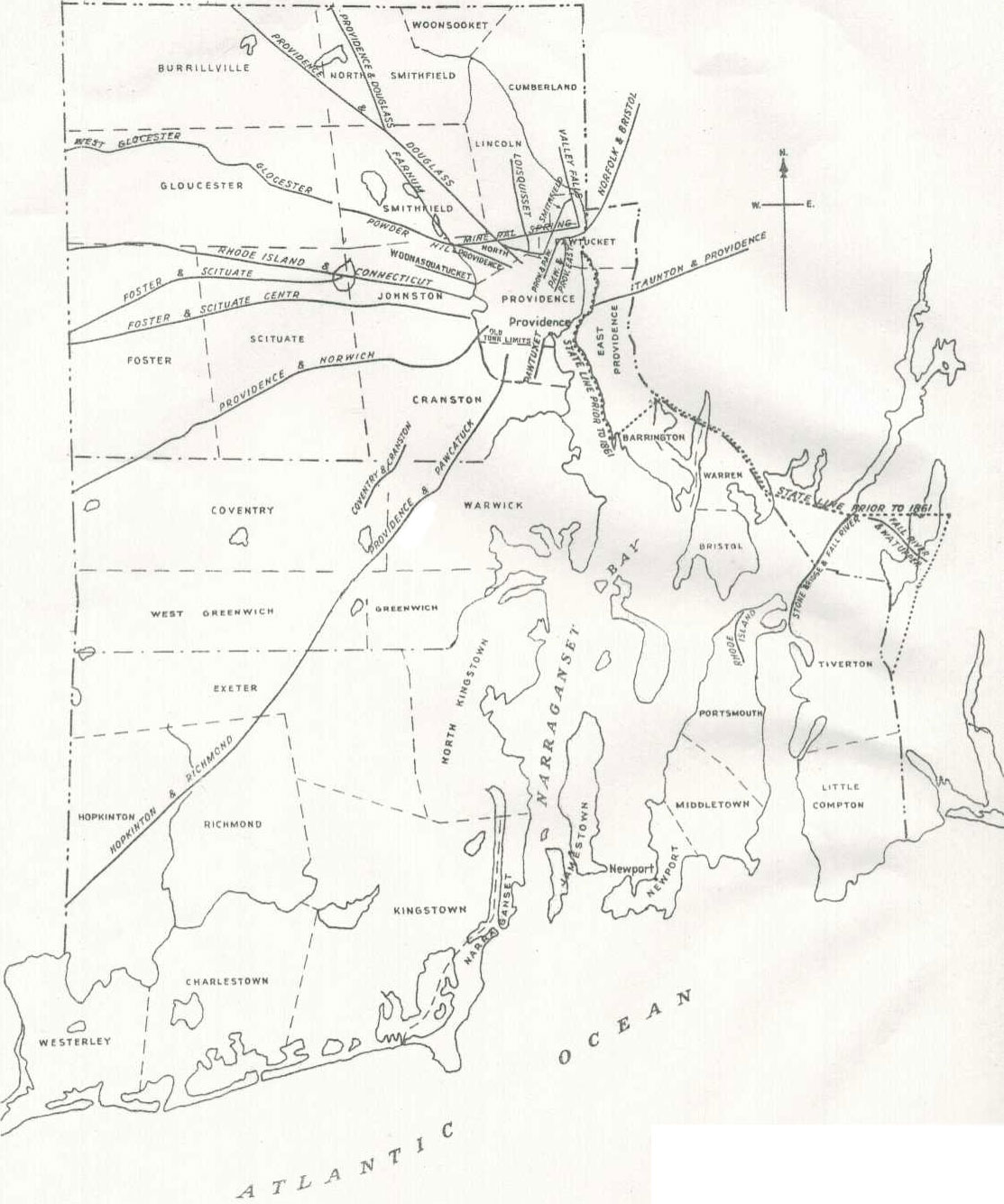
Map of the turnpikes

The following turnpikes were chartered and built in Rhode Island:

1. West Glocester Turnpike 1794
2. Providence and Norwich Turnpike 1794
3. Rhode Island and Connecticut Turnpike 1803
4. Glocester Turnpike 1804
5. Providence and Douglass Turnpike 1805
6. Rhode Island Turnpike 1805
7. Loisquisset Turnpike 1806
8. Providence and Pawtucket Turnpike 1807
9. Farnum and Providence Turnpike 1808
10. Woonasquatucket Turnpike 1810
11. Powder Mill Turnpike 1810
12. Natick Turnpike 1812
13. Valley Falls Turnpike 1813
14. Foster and Scituate Turnpike 1813
15. Foster and Scituate Central Turnpike 1813
16. Coventry and Cranston Turnpike
17. Providence and Pawcatuck Turnpike 1816
18. Hopkinton and Richmond Turnpike 1820
19. Smithfield Turnpike 1823
20. Pawtuxet Turnpike 1825
21. Mineral Spring Turnpike 1825
22. Pawtucket and Providence East Turnpike 1825
23. Fall River and Watupper Turnpike 1827 (became within Massachusetts after a border change in 1861)
24. Stone Bridge and Fall River Turnpike 1838

== Current turnpikes ==
There is only one turnpike in Rhode Island currently:

- New London Turnpike
