= Special routes of U.S. Route 6 =

Special routes of U.S. Route 6

Highway system
- United States Numbered Highway System; List; Special; Divided

Several special routes of U.S. Route 6 (US 6) exist. In order from west to east, these special routes are as follows.

== Nevada ==
=== Ely business route ===
U.S. Route 6 Business
- Location: Ely, Nevada

=== Ely spur route ===
U.S. Route 6 Spur
- Location: Ely, Nevada

== Utah ==
=== Colton–Castle Gate temporary route ===
Temporary U.S. Route 6
- Location: Colton–Castle Gate, Utah

=== Helper business loop ===
U.S. Route 6 Business
- Location: Helper, Utah
- Length: 0.9 mi (1,400 m)

U.S. Route 6 Business (US-6 Bus.) is a short highway serving the downtown areas of Helper, Utah. The route begins at an at-grade intersection with US-6/US-191 southwest of Helper and proceeds east on Poplar Street to Main Street; this portion is cosigned with State Route 157 (SR-157). The route turns north onto Main Street, passing through downtown Helper. After curving to the northwest and again to the west, the route ends at a diamond interchange (exit 232) on US-6/US-191.

=== Price business loop ===
U.S. Route 6 Business
- Location: Price, Utah
- Length: 3 mi (4.8 km)

U.S. Route 6 Business (US-6 Bus.) is a short highway that loops around the town of Price, Utah, beginning and ending at US-6/US-191 in a span of three miles (4.8 km). SR-55 is cosigned with the route.

=== Cisco business route ===
U.S. Route 6 Business
- Location: Cisco, Utah

== Colorado ==
=== Grand Junction bypass route ===
U.S. Highway 6 Bypass
- Location: Grand Junction, Colorado

== Nebraska ==
=== Hastings business loop ===
U.S. Highway 6 Business
- Location: Hastings, Nebraska
- Length: 4.7 mi (7.6 km)

U.S. Highway 6 Business (US 6 Bus.) runs for approximately 4.7 miles (7.6 km) through Hastings, Nebraska, north of mainline US 6. It crosses US 34 downtown, before that route turns west to run concurrently with US 6.

=== Lincoln business route ===
U.S. Highway 6 Business
- Location: Lincoln, Nebraska

=== Lincoln city route ===
U.S. Highway 6 City
- Location: Lincoln, Nebraska

== Iowa ==
=== Des Moines city route 1 ===
U.S. Highway 6 City
- Location: Des Moines, Iowa
- Existed: 1935–1965

=== Des Moines city route 2 ===
U.S. Highway 6 City
- Location: Des Moines, Iowa
- Existed: 1964–1965

=== Davenport business route ===
U.S. Highway 6 Business
- Location: Davenport, Iowa

=== Davenport city route ===
U.S. Highway 6 City
- Location: Davenport, Iowa

== Illinois ==
=== Moline–Joliet temporary route ===
Temporary U.S. Route 6
- Location: Moline–Joliet, Illinois

== Illinois-Indiana ==
=== Lansing–Lake Station business loop ===
U.S. Route 6 Business
- Location: Lansing, Illinois–Lake Station, Indiana

U.S. Route 6 Business (US 6 Bus.) followed along Ridge Road, the former alignment of US 6 before the route was moved to the Borman Expressway which also carried Interstate 80 (I-80) and I-94 and half of US 41 through the cities and towns of Northwest Indiana. The route began in Lansing, Illinois, and heads east across the state line into Munster, Indiana, and traveled through Highland, Griffith, the southern part of Gary, and Hobart (where the road was marked as 37th Avenue). The route ended in Hobart at the intersection of US 6, State Road 51 (SR 51), and SR 130.

== Indiana ==
=== Bremen business route ===
U.S. Route 6 Business
- Location: Bremen, Indiana

== Ohio ==
=== Napoleon business route ===
U.S. Route 6 Business
- Location: Napoleon, Ohio

U.S. Route 6 Business (US 6 Bus.) runs along State Route 108 (SR 108) and SR 110 in Napoleon, Ohio.

Major intersections

The entire route is in Henry County.

Location	mi	km	Destinations	Notes
Napoleon	0.00	0.00	US 6 / US 24 / SR 108 north (Scott Street) – Defiance, Wauseon, Maumee	Western terminus; western end of SR 108 concurrency; exit 40 (US 6/US 24)
Napoleon	1.49	2.40	SR 110 begins / Riverview Avenue – Henry County Hospital	Riverview Avenue former SR 424; western end of SR 110 concurrency; western terminus of SR 110
Maumee River	1.58– 1.74	2.54– 2.80	Bridge over the Maumee River	
Napoleon	1.79	2.88	SR 108 south (S. Perry Street) / W. Maumee Avenue – Holgate	Eastern end of SR 108 concurrency
Harrison Township	5.70	9.17	US 6 / SR 110 – Bryan, Grand Rapids, Bowling Green	Eastern terminus; eastern end of SR 110 concurrency
1.000 mi = 1.609 km; 1.000 km = 0.621 mi: Concurrency terminus

=== Sandusky–Huron alternate route ===
U.S. Route 6 Alternate
- Location: Sandusky–Huron, Ohio

=== Western Greater Cleveland alternate route ===
U.S. Route 6 Alternate
- Location: Rocky River–Cleveland, Ohio
- Length: 7.30 mi (11.75 km)
- Existed: 1969–present

U.S. Route 6 Alternate (US 6 Alt.) is an east–west alternate route of US 6 located in Greater Cleveland, traveling 7.30 miles (11.75 km). Its western terminus is at US 6 in Rocky River, Ohio, just west of the Rocky River, overlapping US 6's connection with SR 2; its eastern terminus is just west of the Cuyahoga River in the Ohio City neighborhood of Cleveland. US 20 and SR 113 travel concurrent with US 6 Alt. for 0.2 miles (0.32 km) while they cross the Rocky River. Nearly all of its seven-mile (11 km) span follows Detroit Avenue's alignment through Lakewood and Cleveland, which also carried US 20 Alt. for a time. The far western portion in Rocky River follows Detroit and Old Lake roads.

US 6 Alt. exists to provide a route for truck traffic, as commercial vehicles are prohibited on Clifton Boulevard.

=== Eastern Greater Cleveland alternate route ===
U.S. Route 6 Alternate
- Location: Cleveland–East Cleveland, Ohio
- Existed: 1936–1967

U.S. Route 6 Alternate (US 6 Alt.) traveled along Euclid Avenue, with US 20 Alt., in Cleveland and East Cleveland, Ohio, from 1936 until 1967, when US 20 was removed from US 6 and routed along Euclid Avenue from Superior Avenue in East Cleveland to Public Square in Cleveland.

=== Euclid–Chardon alternate route ===
U.S. Route 6 Alternate
- Location: Euclid–Chardon, Ohio

== Pennsylvania ==
=== Union City bypass route ===
U.S. Route 6 Bypass
- Location: Union City, Pennsylvania

=== Warren business loop ===
U.S. Route 6 Business
- Location: Warren, Pennsylvania
- Length: 3.89 mi (6.26 km)
- Existed: 1989–present

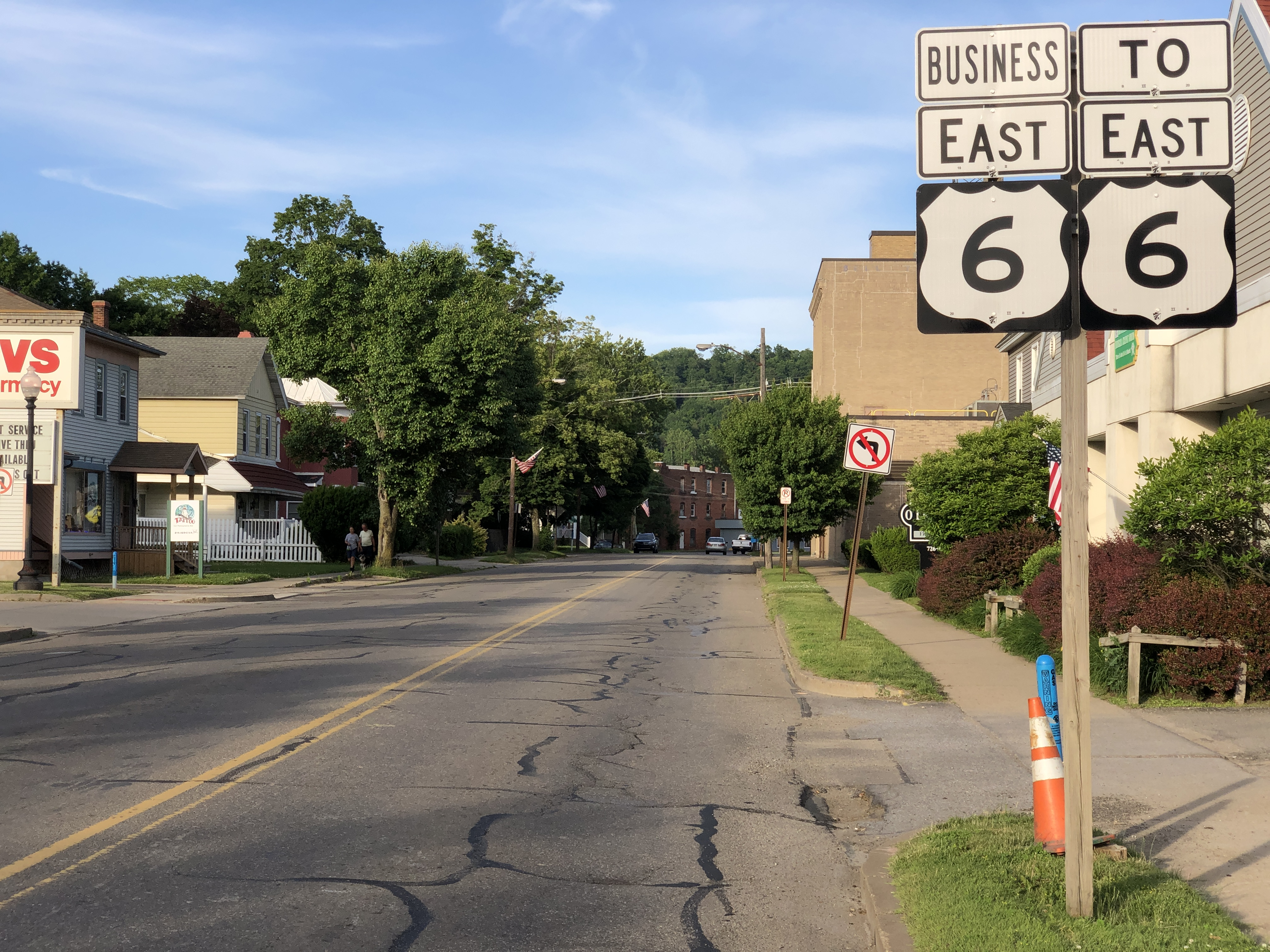
US 6 Bus. eastbound in Warren

U.S. Route 6 Business (US 6 Bus.) is a four-mile (6.4 km) loop through the city center of Warren, Pennsylvania. In 1989, a freeway bypass for US 6 was completed on the south side of the Allegheny River, while the original routing plus a connecting bridge were designated as a business loop. Except for following Ludlow Street near its western terimus, the route mostly follows Pennsylvania Avenue. It is cosigned with US 62 for the westernmost 1.24 miles (2.00 km) of its route.

Major intersections

The entire route is in Warren County.

Location	mi	km	Destinations	Notes
Warren	0.00	0.00	US 6 / US 62 south (Grand Army of the Republic Highway) – Corry, Irvine, Sheffield	Western terminus; western end of US 62 concurrency; interchange
Warren	1.24	2.00	US 62 north (Laurel Street) – North Warren	Eastern end of US 62 concurrency
Mead Township	3.89	6.26	US 6 (Grand Army of the Republic Highway) – Sheffield, Corry, Clarendon, Chapman State Park	Eastern terminus
1.000 mi = 1.609 km; 1.000 km = 0.621 mi: Concurrency terminus

=== Tunkhannock business loop ===
U.S. Route 6 Business
- Location: Tunkhannock Township–Tunkhannock, Pennsylvania
- Length: 1.96 mi (3.15 km)
- Existed: 2000–present

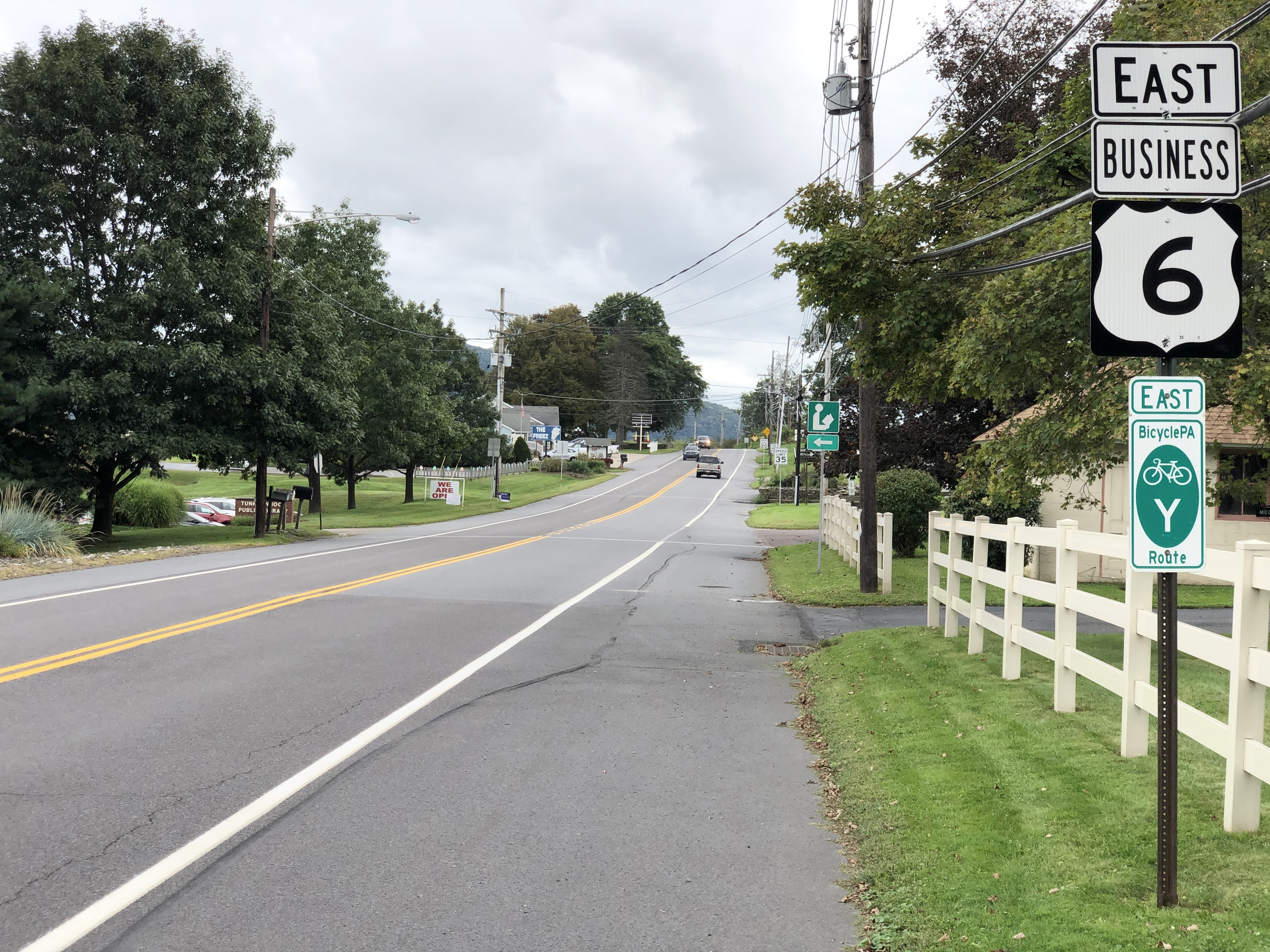
US 6 Bus. eastbound past US 6 in Tunkhannock Township

U.S. Route 6 Business (US 6 Bus.) is a two-mile-long (3.2 km) loop through the borough of Tunkhannock, Pennsylvania. The route was signed in 2000, as a wider (but still two-lane) bypass was constructed along the Susquehanna River to avoid the narrow old alignment. The business loop, also known as Tioga Street, is the main artery of the town.

Major intersections

The entire route is in Wyoming County.

Location	mi	km	Destinations	Notes
Tunkhannock Township	0.00	0.00	US 6 (Grand Army of the Republic Highway) – Towanda, Nicholson, Scranton	Western terminus; interchange
Tunkhannock	1.35	2.17	PA 29 (Bridge Street) – Montrose, Wilkes-Barre, Skyhaven Airport	
Tunkhannock	1.96	3.15	US 6 (Grand Army of the Republic Highway) / PA 92 – Towanda, Pittston, Scranton	Eastern terminus
1.000 mi = 1.609 km; 1.000 km = 0.621 mi

=== Lackawanna County business loop ===
U.S. Route 6 Business
- Location: Scranton–Carbondale Township, Pennsylvania
- Length: 14.545 mi (23.408 km)
- Existed: 1999–present

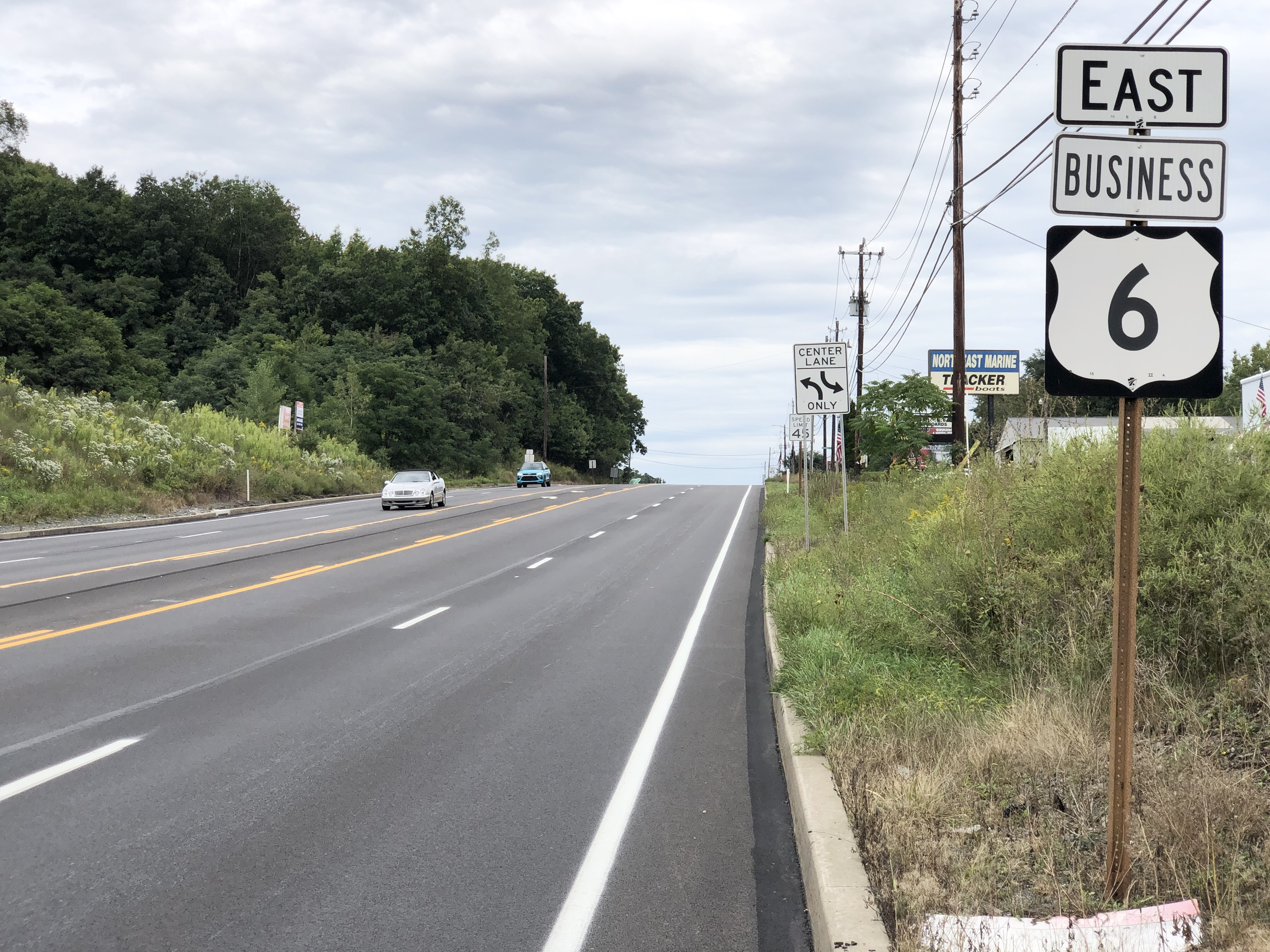
US 6 Bus. eastbound past Pennsylvania Route 347 in Blakely

U.S. Route 6 Business (US 6 Bus.) is a 15-mile-long (24 km) loop through northern suburbs of the city of Scranton, Pennsylvania. The route was formed in 1999, after a freeway bypass was constructed. The route begins as a four-lane undivided highway, featuring a variety of businesses but avoiding the centers of suburbs like Dickson City and Blakely. It then becomes a two-lane route and skirts north of the narrow suburban finger by traveling through Archbald Pothole State Park and Pennsylvania forestry land. Upon entering Carbondale, the route dips south back into suburban development and serves as a narrow two-lane street for the remainder of its route.

Major intersections

The entire route is in Lackawanna County.

Location	mi	km	Destinations	Notes
Scranton	0.000	0.000	US 11 (Scranton Expressway / Northern Boulevard) / Oak Street – Scranton, Clarks Summit	Western terminus; interchange
Scranton	0.229	0.369	I-81 / US 6 – Binghamton, Wilkes-Barre	Exit 191 on I-81
Blakely	3.287	5.290	PA 347 – Dickson City, Justus	Interchange
Archbald	5.214	8.391	PA 247 (Wildcat Road)	
Jermyn	8.345	13.430	PA 107 – Jermyn, Mayfield, Tompkinsville	Interchange
Carbondale	12.234	19.689	PA 106 west (Salem Avenue)	Eastern terminus of PA 106
Carbondale	12.520	20.149	PA 171 north (Belmont Street) – Simpson, Vandling, Forest City	Southern terminus of PA 171
Carbondale Township	14.545	23.408	US 6 (Governor Casey Highway) – Honesdale, Dunmore	Eastern terminus
1.000 mi = 1.609 km; 1.000 km = 0.621 mi

== New York ==
=== Highlands truck route ===
U.S. Route 6 Truck
- Location: Woodbury–Highlands, New York
- Length: 12.22 mi (19.67 km)

U.S. Route 6 Truck (US 6 Truck) is a 12.22-mile (19.67 km) truck route of US 6 in eastern Orange County, New York. It begins at the trumpet interchange with US 6 and New York State Route 293 (NY 293) in Woodbury near Harriman State Park, and the route follows NY 293. It heads northwest for 6.82-mile (10.98 km), where it meets US 9W and NY 218 in Highlands. Here, NY 293 ends, and US 6 Truck starts its concurrency with US 9W, heading south. From there, the two routes run concurrently until the Bear Mountain Circle, where the route rejoins US 6 and meets US 202, in Highlands near Bear Mountain State Park. The route serves as a bypass of the Long Mountain and Palisades Parkways, which are restricted to passenger cars only.

Major intersections

The entire route is in Orange County.

Location	mi	km	Destinations	Notes
Woodbury	0.00	0.00	US 6 (Long Mountain Parkway) – Central Valley, Chester, Peekskill NY 293 begins	Interchange; western terminus; southern terminus of NY 293
Highlands	6.82	10.98	Western end of limited-access section	
Highlands	6.82	10.98	US 9W north / NY 218 north – Newburgh, West Point NY 293 ends	Western end of US 9W/NY 218 concurrency; northern terminus of NY 293
Highlands	7.58	12.20	NY 218 south – West Point, Highland Falls	Eastern end of NY 218 concurrency
Highlands	9.53	15.34	NY 218 north – West Point, Highland Falls, West Point Visitor Center	Southern terminus of NY 218
Highlands	10.43	16.79	Eastern end of limited-access section	
Highlands	10.43	16.79	Old State Road (NY 980U north)	
Highlands	12.22	19.67	US 6 / US 202 (Bear Mountain Bridge) / US 9W south / Palisades Parkway south – Central Valley, Peekskill, Haverstraw, New Jersey	Bear Mountain Circle; eastern terminus; eastern end of US 9W concurrency; northern terminus of Palisades Parkway
1.000 mi = 1.609 km; 1.000 km = 0.621 mi: Concurrency terminus; Tolled

=== Garrison alternate route ===
U.S. Route 6 Alternate
- Location: Cortlandt, New York
- Length: 10.79 mi (17.36 km)

U.S. Route 6 Alternate (US 6 Alt.; concurrent with US 202 Alt. for its entire length) is a 10.79-mile (17.36 km) alternate route of US 6 and US 202 in southern Putnam County and northern Westchester County, New York. It begins where US 6 and US 202 meet NY 9D at the eastern foot of the Bear Mountain Bridge and follows NY 9D north to NY 403 in Garrison. From there, it heads south on NY 403 and US 9 to rejoin US 6 and US 202 at the traffic circle north of Peekskill. The route serves as a bypass of the segment of US 6 and US 202 known as Bear Mountain Bridge Road, a sharply winding route along the Hudson River. This bypass is an important route for commercial vehicles which cannot traverse Bear Mountain Bridge Road, though they are permitted to do so.

Major intersections

County	Location	mi	km	Destinations	Notes
Westchester	Cortlandt	0.00	0.00	US 6 / US 202 (Bear Mountain Bridge) to US 9W / Palisades Parkway south – Peekskill, Bear Mountain NY 9D begins / US 202 Alt. begins	Western terminus; southern terminus of NY 9D; western terminus of US 202 Alt.
Putnam	Garrison	4.54	7.31	NY 9D north – Cold Spring, Fishkill NY 403 begins	Eastern end of NY 9D concurrency; northern terminus of NY 403
Putnam	Graymoor	6.81	10.96	US 9 north – Fishkill NY 403 ends	Western end of US 9 concurrency; southern terminus of NY 403
Westchester	Cortlandt	9.94	16.00	Highland Avenue	Interchange; eastbound exit and westbound entrance
Westchester	Cortlandt	10.79	17.36	US 6 / US 9 south / US 202 – Peekskill, Bear Mountain, Camp Smith US 202 Alt. ends	Annsville Circle; eastern terminus; eastern terminus of US 202 Alt.; eastern end of US 9 concurrency
1.000 mi = 1.609 km; 1.000 km = 0.621 mi: Concurrency terminus; Incomplete access

== Connecticut ==
=== Newtown–Southbury alternate route ===
U.S. Route 6A
- Location: Newton–Southbury, Connecticut

U.S. Route 6A (US 6A) between Newtown and Southbury, Connecticut, was the original surface routing of US 6 before the formation of expressway that later became I-84; currently Route 816.

=== Plymouth–Hartford alternate route ===
U.S. Route 6A
- Location: Plymouth–Hartford, Connecticut

U.S. Route 6A (US 6A) between Plymouth and Hartford, Connecticut, is currently US 6. At this time, the old US 6 went along Route 64 to downtown Waterbury then along Route 10 to Farmington.

=== Woodbury–Willimantic alternate route ===
U.S. Route 6A
- Location: Woodbury–Willimantic, Connecticut
- Existed: 1941–????

U.S. Route 6A (US 6A) originally connected Woodbury to Willimantic, Connecticut. West of Meriden, this was the original alignment of US 6. When US 6 was reassigned to the former US 6A from Plymouth to Farmington, this became US 6A. This US 6A was subsequently extended through Meriden to Willimantic along modern Route 66. An expressway upgrade was planned for this US 6A. Only a portion of the highway was built and is now I-691.

=== Coventry–Windham alternate route ===
U.S. Route 6A
- Location: Coventry–Windham, Connecticut
- Existed: 1942

U.S. Route 6A (US 6A) between Coventry and Windham, Connecticut, was designated when New England Route 3 (Route 3) was deleted. The route was swapped with the old US 6 in 1939 and finally deleted in 1942 when US 6A became Route 31.

=== Danielson alternate route ===
U.S. Route 6A
- Location: Danielson, Connecticut

U.S. Route 6A (US 6A) in Danielson, Connecticut, was the old routing of US 6 prior to construction of the two-lane freeway.

== Rhode Island ==
=== Scituate business/bypass routes ===
U.S. Route 6 Business
- Danielson Pike
- Location: Scituate, Rhode Island
- Length: 4.13 mi (6.65 km)

U.S. Route 6 Bypass
- Location: Scituate, Rhode Island

In Scituate, Rhode Island, US 6 splits into U.S. Route 6 Business (US 6 Bus.) and U.S. Route 6 Bypass (US 6 Byp.), with mainline US 6 following US 6 Byp. The business alignment travels further south along the old turnpike and is mostly signed as US 6 without a banner. The route is also known as Danielson Pike for its entirety. The bypass is signed mostly as US 6 Byp. on sign assemblies but as bannerless US 6 on green guide signs. Most maps and information takes US 6 along the bypass.

The business and bypass cross Route 102 soon after splitting. The western half of the bypass is a two-lane limited-access road, with one grade separation, under Gleaner Chapel Road, and one intersection, at Route 102. This newer section ends as it merges with Route 101, once the Rhode Island and Connecticut Turnpike, and now called Hartford Pike. The two parallel alignments cross the Scituate Reservoir and Route 116 before they merge near the east edge of Scituate. This merge was the east end of the Foster and Scituate Turnpike and was the east end of Route 101 until the early 2000s (when it was truncated to the merge with US 6 Byp.). The Rhode Island and Connecticut Turnpike continued to the Olneyville section of Providence, where it is known as Hartford Avenue.

Major intersections

The entire route is in Scituate, Providence County.

mi	km	Destinations	Notes
0.00	0.00	US 6 east (North Scituate Bypass) – Providence	Western terminus; no access to US 6 east or from US 6 west
0.20	0.32	Route 102 (Chopmist Hill Road) to US 6 – Coventry, Glocester	
2.17	3.49	Rockland Road – Clayville	
3.42	5.50	Route 116 (West Greenville Road) – Hope, Greenville	
4.13	6.65	US 6 east (Hartford Avenue) – Providence	Eastern terminus; no access to US 6 west
1.000 mi = 1.609 km; 1.000 km = 0.621 mi

=== Johnston–Providence alternate route ===
U.S. Route 6A
- Location: Johnston–Providence, Rhode Island
- Length: 3.70 mi (5.95 km)
- Existed: 1991–present

U.S. Route 6A (US 6A) is an alternate route of US 6 in Rhode Island. The route begins at US 6 and I-295 in Johnston and follows Hartford Avenue 2.50 miles (4.02 km) through the city. US 6A continues into Providence, traveling 1.20 miles (1.93 km) along Hartford Avenue to its terminus at US 6.

US 6A previously carried mainline US 6 until 1991, when the US 6 designation was moved to the Dennis J. Roberts Expressway replacing the expressway's previous designation of Route 195.

Major intersections

The entire route is in Providence County.

Location	mi	km	Destinations	Notes
Johnston	0.00	0.00	I-295 / US 6 – Woonsocket, North Attleborough, Hartford, Warwick, Providence	Western terminus; exit 9C (I-295)
Johnston	0.97	1.56	Route 5 (Atwood Avenue) – Johnston	
Johnston	1.94	3.12	US 6 east – Providence	Interchange
Providence	2.58	4.15	Route 128 north (Killingly Street) – Johnston	Southern terminus of RI 128
Providence	3.70	5.95	US 6 to Route 10 / Hartford Avenue – Johnston, Providence	Eastern terminus; interchange; continues as Hartford Avenue
1.000 mi = 1.609 km; 1.000 km = 0.621 mi

=== Johnston bypass route ===
U.S. Route 6 Bypass
- Location: Johnston, Rhode Island

== Massachusetts ==
=== Marion–Wareham temporary route ===
Temporary U.S. Route 6
- Location: Marion–Wareham, Massachusetts

=== Cape Cod Canal bypass route ===
U.S. Route 6 Bypass
- Location: Bourne–Sagamore, Massachusetts

U.S. Route 6 Bypass (US 6 Byp.) was signed along both sides of the Cape Cod Canal in Massachusetts opposite of mainline US 6, which also ran along both sides of the canal along two-way roads. At the eastern terminus of Route 25, US 6 eastbound once crossed the Cape Cod Canal via the Bourne Bridge then followed Sandwich Road along the south side of the canal to the Sagamore Bridge where it joined the Mid-Cape Highway on its way to Provincetown. US 6 westbound would leave the Mid-Cape Highway and cross the Sagamore Bridge then followed the Scenic Highway along the north side of the canal back to the Bourne Bridge. The opposite directions of those two roads were signed as US 6 Byp. (such that the eastbound bypass route was on the north side of the canal while the westbound was along the south side).

Today, both directions of US 6 travels only along the north side of the canal along Scenic Highway. Sandwich Road is now signed "TO 6" from the Sagamore Bridge to the Bourne Bridge, although a single US 6 Byp. sign still exists along Sandwich Road just north of the Bourne Bridge rotary.

=== South Dennis–East Dennis temporary route ===
Temporary U.S. Route 6
- Location: South Dennis–East Dennis, Massachusetts

=== Harwich–Brewster temporary route ===
Temporary U.S. Route 6
- Location: Harwich–Brewster, Massachusetts

== See also ==
- List of special routes of the United States Numbered Highway System
