= Plain Farm House =

Historic house in Rhode Island, United States

- U.S. National Register of Historic Places
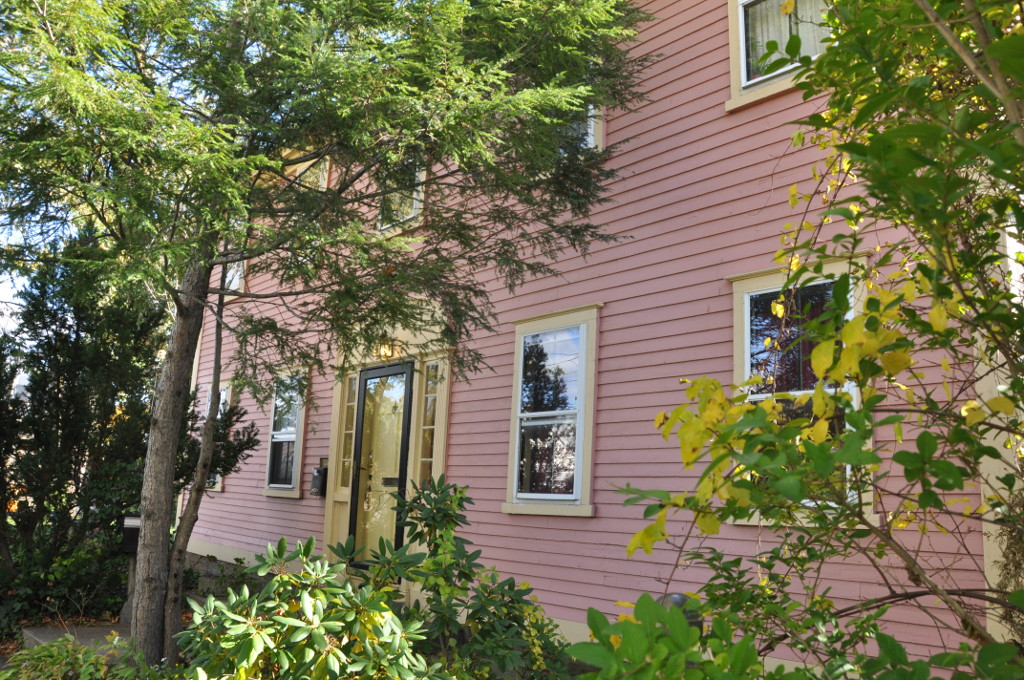

- Location within Rhode Island Location within the United States
- Location: 108 Webster Ave., Providence, Rhode Island
- Coordinates: 41°48′48″N 71°27′02″W
- Architectural style: Federal
- NRHP reference No.: 80000006
- Added to NRHP: June 27, 1980

The Plain Farm House is an historic house in Providence, Rhode Island. It is a 2 1/2-story wood-frame structure, five bays wide, with a central entry flanked by sidelight windows and topped by a semi-elliptical fan. The house was probably built in the early 19th century, based on its Federal styling, and on the opening of the nearby Norwick Pike (now Plainfield Street, Rhode Island Route 14) in 1803. At the time of its construction the area was part of Johnston, and was annexed to Providence in 1898. Once the main house of a large farm, it is now surrounded by residential development.

The house was listed on the National Register of Historic Places in 1980.

== See also ==
- National Register of Historic Places listings in Providence, Rhode Island
