= Connecticut Route 101 =

State highway in Windham County, Connecticut, US

Route 101
- Map of Windham County in northeastern Connecticut with Route 101 highlighted in red

Route information
- Maintained by CTDOT
- Length: 9.46 mi (15.22 km)
- Existed: 1935–present

Major junctions
- West end: US 44 in Pomfret
- I-395 / Route 12 in Killingly
- East end: Route 101 at the Rhode Island state line in Foster, RI

Location
- Country: United States
- State: Connecticut
- Counties: Windham

Highway system
- Connecticut State Highway System; Interstate; US; State; SSR; SR; Scenic
← Route 100	→ Route 102

Route 101 is a state highway in northeastern Connecticut running from Pomfret to the Rhode Island state line in Killingly. The road originated as a 19th-century toll road known as the Connecticut and Rhode Island Turnpike. Route 101 was designated along the modern alignment in 1935 when an earlier Route 101 was renumbered to U.S. Route 44.

== Route description ==
Route 101 starts at U.S. Route 44 as Mashamoquet Road then Killingly Road in the town of Pomfret. It runs along the Mashamoquet Brook State Park before intersecting with Route 169. It proceeds eastward, soon passing over the Quinebaug River into the town of Killingly. East of the river, the road becomes known as Hartford Pike. Route 101 then intersects Interstate 395 and Route 12, then passes near Chase Pond, a small pond related to the Chase Reservoir. Route 101 then passes between two large lakes; on the north, the Middle Reservoir (also known as the Chestnut Hill Reservoir), and on the south, the Bog Meadow Pond. It passes by more reservoirs, as it reaches its end at the Connecticut–Rhode Island border. Route 101 continues in Rhode Island as Rhode Island Route 101.

Route 101 from the western terminus to milepost 6.78 in East Killingly is also known as the Leif Ericson Highway.

== History ==
In the 19th century, modern day Route 101 was originally known as the Connecticut and Rhode Island Turnpike and was one of several routes connecting Hartford (via the Boston Turnpike) and Providence. It began at the Boston Turnpike in Phoenixville (at the junction of modern Route 198 and Route 44) and went eastward along modern Route 44 to west of Pomfret Landing, then along modern Route 101 through Killingly Center to the Rhode Island state line. Beyond the state line it continued as the Rhode Island and Connecticut Turnpike to Providence.

In 1922, Connecticut numbered its state highways. The turnpike from Phoenixville to west of Pomfret Landing was designated as part of Route 101. The original Route 101 began in South Chaplin, where it split off from New England Route 3. It ran northward via modern Route 198 to Phoenixville then turned eastward along the Connecticut and Rhode Island Turnpike (modern Route 44) to west of Pomfret Landing. Route 101 then continued along modern Route 44 northward to Pomfret Center and eastward through Putnam to the Rhode Island line. Route 101 followed modern Route 44 through Rhode Island all the way to Plymouth, Massachusetts. At the same time, the eastern half of the Connecticut and Rhode Island Turnpike was designated as Highway 137 west of Route 12 and Highway 139 east of Route 12.

In 1932, Route 101 was extended westward across the entire state. It now began in Canaan and ran through Hartford to Phoenixville, where it continued east along its 1920s alignment. The portion of old Route 101 between South Chaplin and Phoenixville became part of Route 91 (now Route 198). Old state highways 137 and 139 were combined into a new Route 202. In 1935, U.S. Route 44 and U.S. Route 202 were designated by AASHO. US 44 used the alignment of the extended Route 101. Old Route 202 was renumbered to Route 101 (since the number was now available) to avoid a numbering conflict with US 202. This route number change was done in cooperation with Rhode Island, which designated the continuation as Rhode Island Route 101. Route 101 was one of the few state routes that survived the 1932 state highway renumbering.

== Junction list ==
The entire route is in Windham County.

Location	mi	km	Destinations	Notes
Pomfret	0.00	0.00	US 44 – Pomfret, Abington	Western terminus
Pomfret	0.42	0.68	Route 169 – Brooklyn, Pomfret	
Killingly	4.87	7.84	I-395 – Norwich, Worcester, MA	Exit 41 on I-395; former Route 52
Killingly	5.02	8.08	Route 12 – Putnam, Dayville	
Killingly	9.46	15.22	Route 101 east – Foster, Scituate	Continuation into Rhode Island
1.000 mi = 1.609 km; 1.000 km = 0.621 mi
