= Rhode Island Route 128 =

State highway in Providence County, Rhode Island, US

Route 128
- Route 128 highlighted in red

Route information
- Maintained by RIDOT
- Length: 3.1 mi (5.0 km)

Major junctions
- South end: US 6A in Providence
- US 6 in Providence
- North end: US 44 in Johnston

Location
- Country: United States
- State: Rhode Island
- Counties: Providence

Highway system
- Rhode Island Routes
← Route 126	→ Route 136

Route 128 is a 3.1-mile-long (5.0 km) state highway in the U.S. state of Rhode Island. The highway links U.S. Route 6A (US 6A), US 6 and US 44.

== Route description ==
Route 128 begins at a signalized intersection with Hartford Avenue (US 6A) and Killingly Street. The highway follows Killingly north towards a partial cloverleaf interchange with US 6 before continuing north through residential neighborhoods. At an T-intersection with Greenville Avenue, Route 128 turns northwest before terminating at the Putnam Pike (US 44).

== Major intersections ==
The entire route is in Providence County.

Location	mi	km	Destinations	Notes
Providence	0.0	0.0	US 6A (Hartford Avenue) / Killingly Street	Southern terminus; Killingly Street continues south
Providence	0.2	0.32	US 6	Partial cloverleaf interchange
Johnston	3.1	5.0	US 44 (Putnam Pike)	Northern terminus
1.000 mi = 1.609 km; 1.000 km = 0.621 mi
