= Route 121 (Rhode Island–Massachusetts) =

Highway in Rhode Island and Massachusetts

Route 121
- Route 121 highlighted in red

Route information
- Maintained by MassDOT
- Length: 5.4 mi (8.7 km) 1.0 mile (1.6 km) in RI; 4.4 miles (7.1 km) in MA
- Existed: 1960s–present

Major junctions
- South end: Route 114 in Cumberland, RI
- North end: Route 1A in Wrentham, MA

Location
- Country: United States
- States: Massachusetts, Rhode Island
- Counties: RI: Providence, MA: Norfolk

Highway system
- Massachusetts State Highway System; Interstate; US; State
- Rhode Island Routes
← Route 120	RI Route 121	→ Route 122
← Route 120	MA Route 121	→ Route 122
← Route 10	RI Route 11	→ Route 12
← Route 10	MA Route 11	→ Route 12
← Route 138A	RI Route 143	→ Route 146
← Route 141	MA Route 152	→ Route 143

Route 121 is a numbered state highway running 1.0 mile (1.6 km) in Rhode Island and 4.4 miles (7.1 km) in Massachusetts. It is part of the route connecting the city of Woonsocket (via Route 114) with the town of Wrentham.

== Route description ==
In Rhode Island, Route 121 exists entirely in a rural section of Cumberland. It proceeds for 1 mile (1.6 km) from an intersection with Route 114 along Wrentham Road to the Massachusetts state line. Now in Wrentham, Massachusetts, the road proceeds for 4.4 miles (7.1 km) to an intersection with Route 1A. In Massachusetts, it is known as Cumberland Road and West Street.

== History ==
The route from Woonsocket to Wrentham was assigned as Route 142 in the early 1920s when the New England states began numbering their state highways. Route 142 ran for about 11 miles (18 km) between Route 122 and current Route 1A (then designated as U.S. Route 1). It used present-day Route 114 from Route 122 in Woonsocket and Cumberland, then along present-day Route 121 to Wrentham.

Around 1933, the entire route (in both Rhode Island and Massachusetts) was renumbered as Route 11 and its northern end extended into Dedham along old Route 1 (current Route 1A) when Route 1 was realigned. Route 11 was later cut back to its original length after a few years when Route 1A was designated in the area.

In the mid-1960s, the southern end of the route was truncated by about 5.4 miles (8.7 km) to its current southern terminus at the intersection of Pine Swamp Road and Diamond Hill Road in Cumberland. This was due to the westward extension of the Route 114 designation into the city of Woonsocket. At the same time, the route was renumbered to Route 121.

== Major intersections ==
State	County	Location	mi	km	Destinations	Notes
Rhode Island	Providence	Cumberland	0.0	0.0	Route 114 (Pine Swamp Road) – Cumberland, Woonsocket	Southern terminus; Route 126 and Route 122 via Route 114 north
Rhode Island–Massachusetts state line			1.0 0.0	1.6 0.0	Route transition	
Massachusetts	Norfolk	Wrentham	4.4	7.1	Route 1A – Wrentham, Norwood, Plainville	Northern terminus
1.000 mi = 1.609 km; 1.000 km = 0.621 mi: Route transition
