= Rhode Island Route 10 =

State highway in Providence County, Rhode Island, US

Route 10
- Huntington Expressway

Route information
- Maintained by RIDOT
- Length: 5.0 mi (8.0 km)
- Existed: 1966–present

Major junctions
- South end: Route 12 in Providence
- US 1 in Providence; I-95 in Cranston; US 6 in Providence
- North end: I-95 / US 6 / Route 146 in Providence

Location
- Country: United States
- State: Rhode Island
- Counties: Providence

Highway system
- Rhode Island Routes
← Route 7	→ Route 11
← Route 179	→ I-195

Route 10 is a numbered state highway connector in the U.S. state of Rhode Island, traveling along the Huntington Expressway, the first freeway in the state. It connects Route 12 (Park Avenue) on the Cranston–Providence city line with Interstate 95 (I-95), U.S. Route 6 (US 6), and Memorial Boulevard in downtown Providence, passing just east of the Olneyville area of Providence. It provides an alternate route to I-95 south of downtown, and connects it with the US 6 freeway west from Olneyville towards I-295 and Connecticut.

== Route description ==
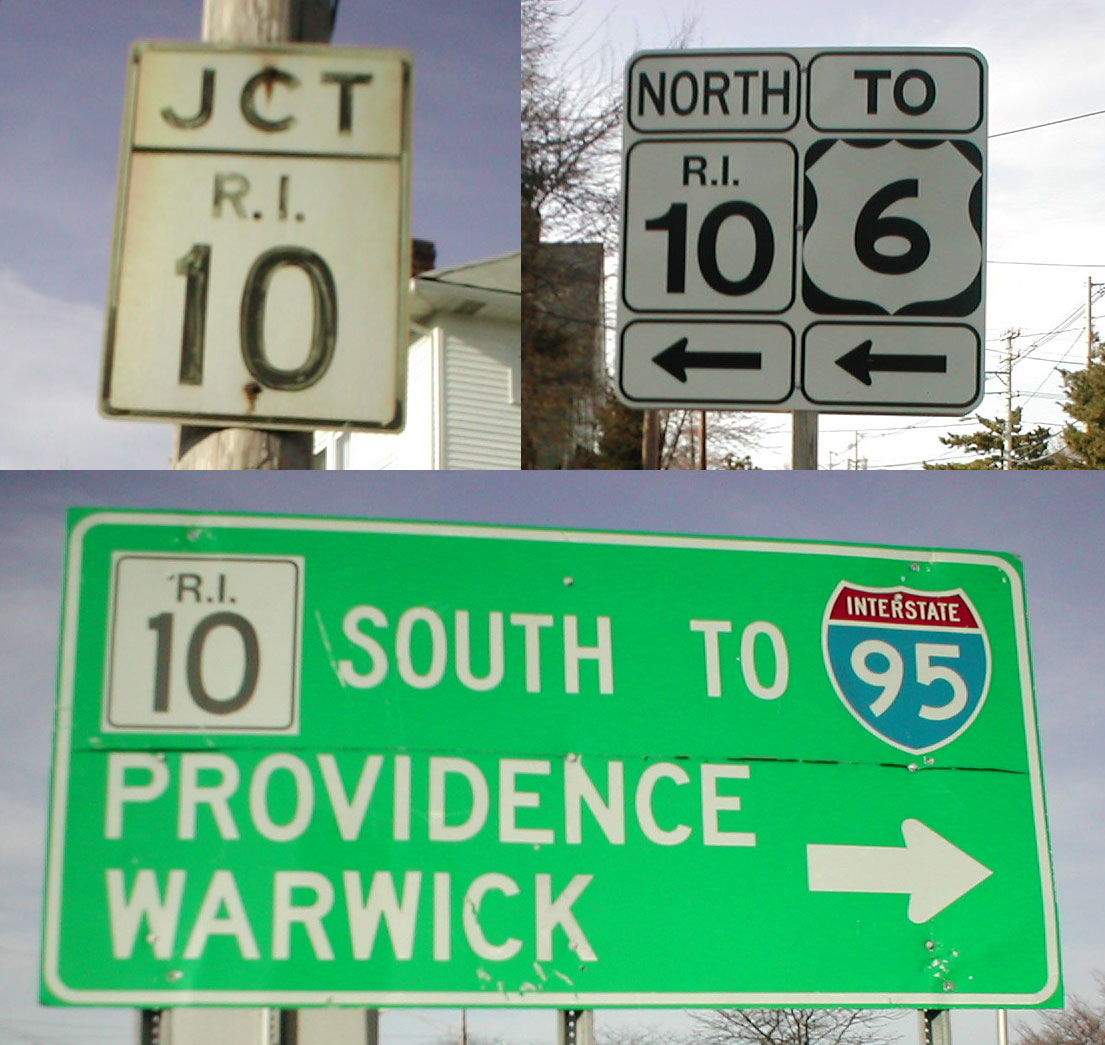
Route 10 signs

Route 10 begins at an incomplete interchange with Route 12 (Park Avenue) on the Cranston-Providence border. The bridge that carries Route 12 over Route 10 has enough space for a four-lane freeway underneath, but only the ramp from Route 12 east to Route 10 north passes under it. Until around 2000, the ramp from Route 10 south to Route 12 east instead passed under the bridge; that movement is now made with a left turn onto Route 12. There were once plans to extend Route 10 south, in conjunction with an eastern extension of the Route 37 freeway.

Route 10 heads north through Providence, turning west before crossing U.S. Route 1 (Elmwood Avenue) at a partial interchange. There is no ramp to Route 10 south, and traffic exiting from Route 10 north must turn north on US 1. After crossing US 1, Route 10 crosses over Amtrak's Northeast Corridor and enters Cranston.

Route 10 crosses Interstate 95 at a full interchange, sometimes known as the "Friendly Interchange" for the community of Quakers it partially destroyed. It then heads northwest, crossing under Pontiac Avenue and then junctioning Route 2 (Reservoir Avenue) just after crossing back into Providence. After the Route 2 interchange, Route 10 again crosses back into Cranston, running west of the parallel Niantic Avenue, which is on the city line. The final crossing, back into Providence, is just after the Cranston Street interchange, where Niantic Avenue ends.

Upon crossing into Providence, Route 10 passes over and parallels the Northeast Corridor as well as interchanging with Huntington Avenue. From this interchange north to Olneyville, Huntington Avenue was upgraded to become the Huntington Expressway. Within this stretch of expressway, there is only one interchange (Union Avenue).

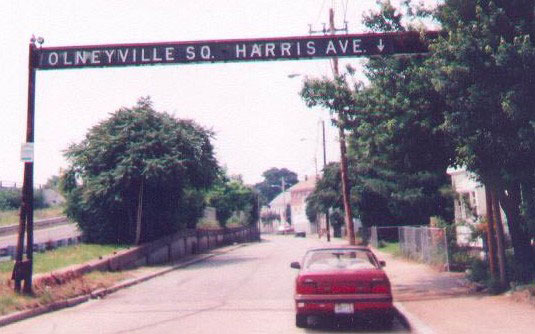
An original (still standing) overhead sign on Harris Avenue at the east end of the Olneyville Bypass

The junction and merge with U.S. Route 6 at Olneyville is part of the Olneyville Bypass, the first freeway in Rhode Island. In the early 2020s, this current interchange was upgraded to conform to modern highway standards, most notably providing direct access from Route 10 North to US 6 West via a flyover ramp (Exit 3B). The flyover ramp officially opened on November 19, 2021. Exit 3B is a left-lane exit to US 6, while mainline traffic remains on the right heading into downtown Providence.

The combined Route 10 and US 6 — known as the Route 6-10 Connector — is the newest part of the Huntington Expressway. It heads northeast and east from Olneyville, interchanging with Dean Street (which provides access to Providence Place Mall). East of Dean Street, the freeway ends at a complicated interchange with Interstate 95. Route 10 ends there, while US 6 turns south with I-95 to reach Interstate 195. Access to downtown Providence is provided by ramps to the west end of Memorial Boulevard at Francis Street (U.S. Route 1).

== History ==
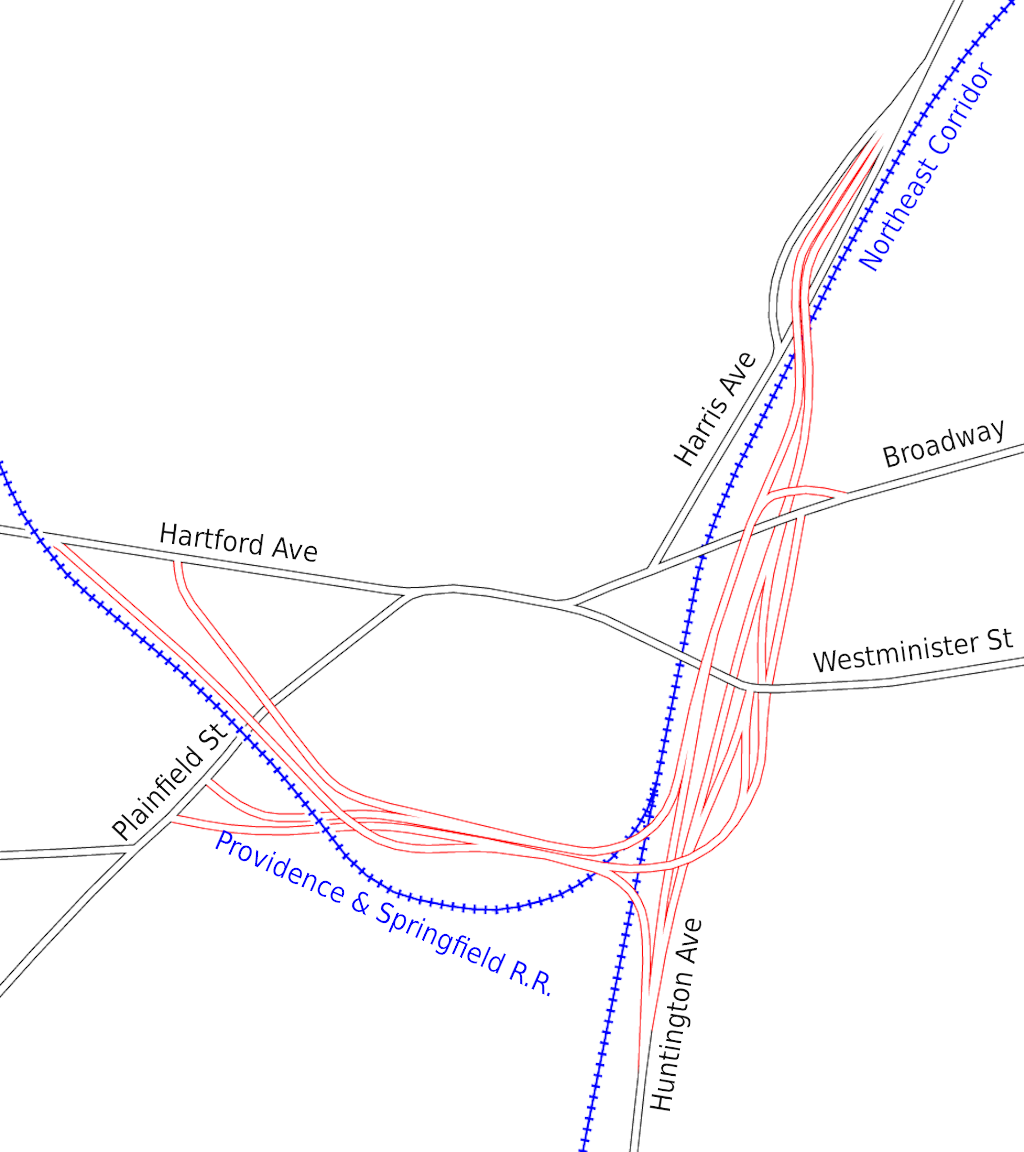
Map of the Olneyville Bypass at the time of its 1953 opening

Despite the first section opening in 1953, the Route 10 designation was not used until 1966, when the freeway south of Route 2 (Reservoir Avenue) opened. The 1953 section was the Olneyville Bypass (also known as the Dennis J. Roberts Expressway, now also applied to U.S. Route 6 west of the bypass). Construction began in 1950 on the bypass of the congested Olneyville neighborhood, which the east–west US 6 and Route 14 passed through (on Westminster Street, Hartford Avenue and Plainfield Street). The bypass ran from Hartford Avenue west of Olneyville around the south and east sides of Olneyville, junctioning with Plainfield Street, Huntington Avenue, Westminster Street and Broadway, and ending at Harris Avenue northeast of Olneyville.

Once the bypass opened in 1953, it carried US 6. Eastbound US 6 exited at Westminster Street to follow its old alignment towards downtown, but westbound US 6 was completely rerouted between downtown and Olneyville, following Kinsley Avenue, Eagle Street and Harris Avenue to reach the Olneyville Bypass.

The next section, from Olneyville south to Reservoir Avenue in Cranston, was built partially along the existing Huntington Avenue, and opened in 1960. It ended at a temporary trumpet interchange with Reservoir Avenue, which at the time carried both Route 2 and Route 3. (Route 3 has since been truncated to its intersection with Route 2 in West Warwick.) Route 2 was rerouted onto the new Huntington Expressway to end at US 6 at Olneyville, while Route 3 continued to run to U.S. Route 1 in Providence.

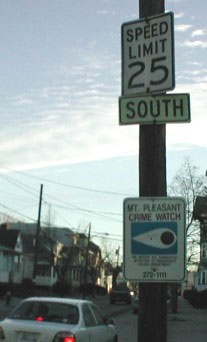
This old SOUTH plate on River Street once had a Route 10 shield underneath.

The rest of the early Huntington Expressway, from Route 2 southeast across Interstate 95 and US 1 to Route 12, was completed in 1966. It was then that the Route 10 designation was applied, and Route 2 was moved back to its present alignment. However, Route 10 did not end at Olneyville — it continued to the end of the bypass at Harris Avenue, and then took Harris Avenue, Eagle Street, Valley Street, River Avenue, Oneil Street (which is now one-way “eastbound,” or what would have been northbound RI 10), Veazie Street, and Branch Avenue to end at Route 146.

The Route 12 interchange was not the planned end of the freeway; it was to continue roughly parallel to Route 117 and Route 117A, meeting Route 37 and ending near the south end of Route 117A.

Interstate 184
- Location: Providence-Cranston

For a time, Interstate 84 was planned to enter Providence via Olneyville. One plan by the state designated the Huntington Expressway south of Olneyville as Interstate 184 (I-184), but this was rejected by the Federal Highway Administration.

The first section of the Route 6-10 Connector, from the east end of the Olneyville Bypass to Dean Street, opened in 1972. At that time, Route 10 was removed from its former surface alignment to a temporary end at Dean Street. The ramp it had taken northbound to Harris Avenue was cut by the new construction, but the abutments for the bridge over the Northeast Corridor and northbound Harris Avenue remained until the early 2020s, when the Route 10/US 6 interchange was rebuilt. US 6 westbound was not moved in 1972, but left to continue to enter the Olneyville Bypass from Harris Avenue at that time. A new ramp from Tobey Street to the bypass was added, however, replacing a removed left entrance from Broadway. The ramp from US 6 east to Westminster Street was also closed around this time, leaving its ramp to Broadway.

The other part of the Connector opened in 1988, connecting the Huntington Expressway and Olneyville Bypass to Interstate 95 in downtown Providence. US 6 was rerouted along the Connector and I-95 to reach Interstate 195. The ramps to downtown, connecting to Memorial Boulevard, did not open until 1993, as part of the redevelopment of downtown.

On October 29, 2014, the southbound exit for Route 2 north (signed as Exit 3B) was closed, and traffic was directed onto Exit 3A (now signed as Exit 2A), which had been updated to allow for turns in both directions.

On November 19, 2021, as an early stage of reconstructing the Route 10/US 6 interchange, a new ramp was opened, allowing direct movement from northbound Route 10 to westbound US 6 for the first time. The following year, the ramp in the opposite direction (US 6 eastbound to RI 10 southbound) was temporarily removed, so for over 12 months, traffic was required to use a temporary ramp to Westminster Street and drive along the left side of the bridge, contrary to most of the United States. After the removed ramp to RI 10 southbound was reopened on May 10, 2024, the temporary ramp was absorbed into a new Westminster Street exit on RI 10 northbound, which opened on August 30, 2024.

== Future ==
As part of their I-95 15 Bridges Project, taking place from 2025 to 2031, RIDOT will be reworking all of RI 10 from its southern terminus to the Reservoir Avenue bridge. The trumpet interchange at Park Avenue will be converted into an at-grade intersection, with eastbound traffic making a left turn to get onto RI 10 northbound, and westbound traffic making a right turn slightly west of its current position. The current RI 10 on-ramp from Park Avenue westbound will be converted into a shared use path that runs parallel to RI 10 for about 6/10ths of a mile, before taking the northbound Elmwood Avenue exit.

Both ramps for the Elmwood Avenue exit (Exit 1A) will be replaced with a signalized intersection. To access Elmwood Avenue, northbound traffic will turn right, while southbound traffic will turn left. The I-95 interchange at exits 1B-C will be replaced with a new design that removes the bridge that carries RI 10 over I-95, Wellington Avenue and the Northeast Corridor. Both directions of RI 10 will have a new left-hand exit that allows vehicles to enter I-95 going in the opposite direction (e.g. RI 10 northbound to I-95 southbound, and vice versa), but movements that enter I-95 going in the same direction will remain relatively unchanged, aside from minor ramp adjustments.

== Exit list ==
Exits were previously unnumbered, but RIDOT numbered exits between the southern terminus and the U.S. Route 6 concurrency in late 2010 to conform with federal highway standards. "Old" (2010–2020) exit numbers courtesy of RIDOT. In 2020, RIDOT renumbered the exits as part of a statewide project to convert to mileage-based numbering. The entire route is in Providence County.

Location	mi	km	Old exit	New exit	Destinations	Notes
Providence	0.0	0.0	-	-	Route 12 (Park Avenue) / Warwick Avenue	At-grade intersection southbound; to be replaced with a new at-grade intersection (2025–2027)
Providence	0.5	0.80	1	1A	US 1 (Elmwood Avenue)	No southbound entrance; no northbound to US 1 south; future jughandle (2025–2027)
Cranston	0.7	1.1	2A-B	1B-C	I-95 – Providence, Warwick	Signed as exits 1B (north) and 1C (south); exit 33 on I-95; to be replaced with a new interchange design (2025–2031)
Providence	1.4	2.3	3	2A	Route 2 (Reservoir Avenue) / Pontiac Avenue – Cranston	
Cranston	2.4	3.9	4	2B	Industrial Park / Niantic Avenue / Garfield Avenue / Cranston Street	
Providence	3.0	4.8	5	3A	Union Avenue / Huntington Avenue	
Providence	3.3	5.3	-	3B	US 6 west	Northbound left exit opened November 19, 2021
Providence	3.5	5.6	6	3C	Westminster Street – Olneyville Square	Northbound exit and southbound entrance; prior to 2021, northbound traffic bound for US 6 west used this exit and traveled through Olneyville Square
Providence	3.7	6.0	-	-	US 6 west to US 6A / Route 14 – Olneyville, Johnston, Hartford, CT	Southern terminus of US 6 concurrency; southbound exit and northbound entrance
Providence	3.9	6.3	-	-	Tobey Street / Harris Avenue	Southbound entrance only
Providence	4.5	7.2	-	-	Dean Street / Atwells Avenue / Providence Place	Northbound signage
Providence	4.5	7.2	-	-	Providence Place	Southbound signage; southbound exit signed as I-95 exit 37D
Providence	4.8	7.7	-	-	Memorial Boulevard – Downtown Providence	Northbound exit and southbound entrance; unsigned access to US 1 (Francis Street) at the intersection at the end of the ramp.
Providence	4.9	7.9	-	-	I-95 / US 6 east to Route 146 north / I-195 east – New York, Boston	Northern terminus of US 6 concurrency; exit 37C on I-95
1.000 mi = 1.609 km; 1.000 km = 0.621 mi: Concurrency terminus; Incomplete access
