= Rhode Island Route 94 =

State highway in Providence County, Rhode Island, US

Route 94
- Route 94 highlighted in red

Route information
- Maintained by RIDOT
- Length: 12.7 mi (20.4 km)

Major junctions
- South end: Route 14 / Route 102 in Foster
- US 6 in Foster; Route 101 in Foster
- North end: US 44 in Chepachet

Location
- Country: United States
- State: Rhode Island
- Counties: Providence

Highway system
- Rhode Island Routes
← Route 91	→ I-95

Route 94 is a numbered state highway running 12.7 miles (20.4 km) in Rhode Island. Route 94's southern terminus is at Route 14 and Route 102 in Foster and the northern terminus is at U.S. Route 44 (US 44) in Chepachet.

== Route description ==
Route 94 takes the following route through the State:

- Foster: 7.1 miles (11.4 km); Route 14/Route 102 to Glocester town line
  - Foster Center Road and Mount Hygeia Road
- Chepachet (Town of Glocester): 5.6 miles (9.0 km); Foster town line to US 44
  - Reynolds Road

== Major intersections ==
The entire route is in Providence County.

Location	mi	km	Destinations	Notes
Foster	0.0	0.0	Route 14 / Route 102 (Plainfield Pike)	Southern terminus
Foster	4.0	6.4	US 6 (Danielson Pike) – Providence, Connecticut	
Foster	7.1	11.4	Route 101 (Old Hartford Pike)	
Chepachet	12.7	20.4	US 44 (Putnam Pike)	Northern terminus
1.000 mi = 1.609 km; 1.000 km = 0.621 mi
