= Rhode Island Route 12 =

State highway in Providence County, Rhode Island, US

Route 12
- Route 12 highlighted in red

Route information
- Maintained by RIDOT
- Length: 17.0 mi (27.4 km)

Major junctions
- West end: Route 14 / Route 102 in Scituate
- US 1 in Cranston; Route 10 in Cranston; US 1A / Route 117 in Cranston
- East end: Broad Street in Cranston

Location
- Country: United States
- State: Rhode Island
- Counties: Providence

Highway system
- Rhode Island Routes
← Route 11	→ Route 14

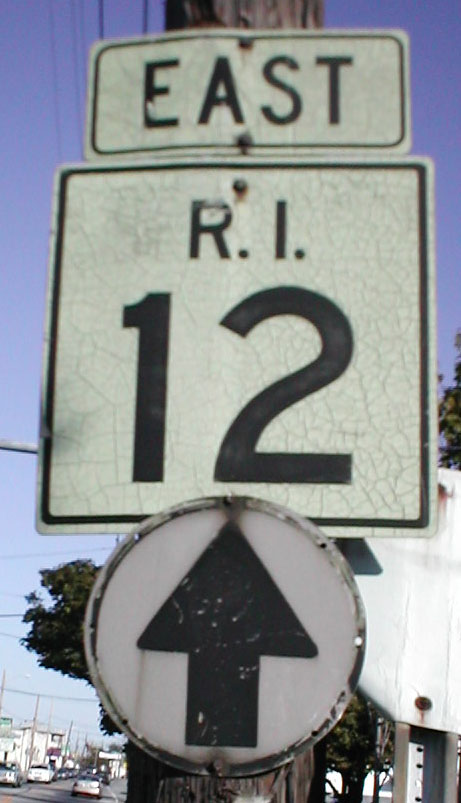
Route 12 sign

Route 12 is a numbered state highway in Rhode Island, United States. It runs approximately 17 miles (27 km) from Route 14 in Foster to Broad Street in Cranston.

== Route description ==
Route 12 starts at Route 14 and Route 102 in Foster. It roughly follows the shore of the Scituate Reservoir before passing over its dam. It passes over I-295 without an interchange and heads towards downtown Cranston. After passing the city center as a main east–west corridor, Route 2 passes Route 10's southern terminus. It passes US 1A and ends at Broad Street, an old alignment of US 1A, 0.3 miles (0.48 km) later.

== Major intersections ==
The entire route is in Providence County.

Location	mi	km	Destinations	Notes
Scituate	0.0	0.0	Route 14 / Route 102 (Plainfield Pike)	Western terminus
Scituate	7.2	11.6	Route 116 (East Road)	
Cranston	12.5	20.1	Route 51 south (Phenix Avenue)	Northern terminus of Route 51
Cranston	12.9	20.8	Route 5 (Atwood Avenue)	
Cranston	14.6	23.5	Route 2 (Reservoir Avenue)	
Cranston	15.6	25.1	US 1 (Elmwood Avenue)	
Cranston	15.8	25.4	Route 10 north to I-95	Interchange, southern terminus of Route 10; future at-grade intersection
Cranston	16.6	26.7	US 1A / Route 117 (Warwick Avenue)	
Cranston	17.0	27.4	Broad Street	Eastern terminus
1.000 mi = 1.609 km; 1.000 km = 0.621 mi
