= Providence County, Rhode Island =

County in Rhode Island, United States

Providence County
- County
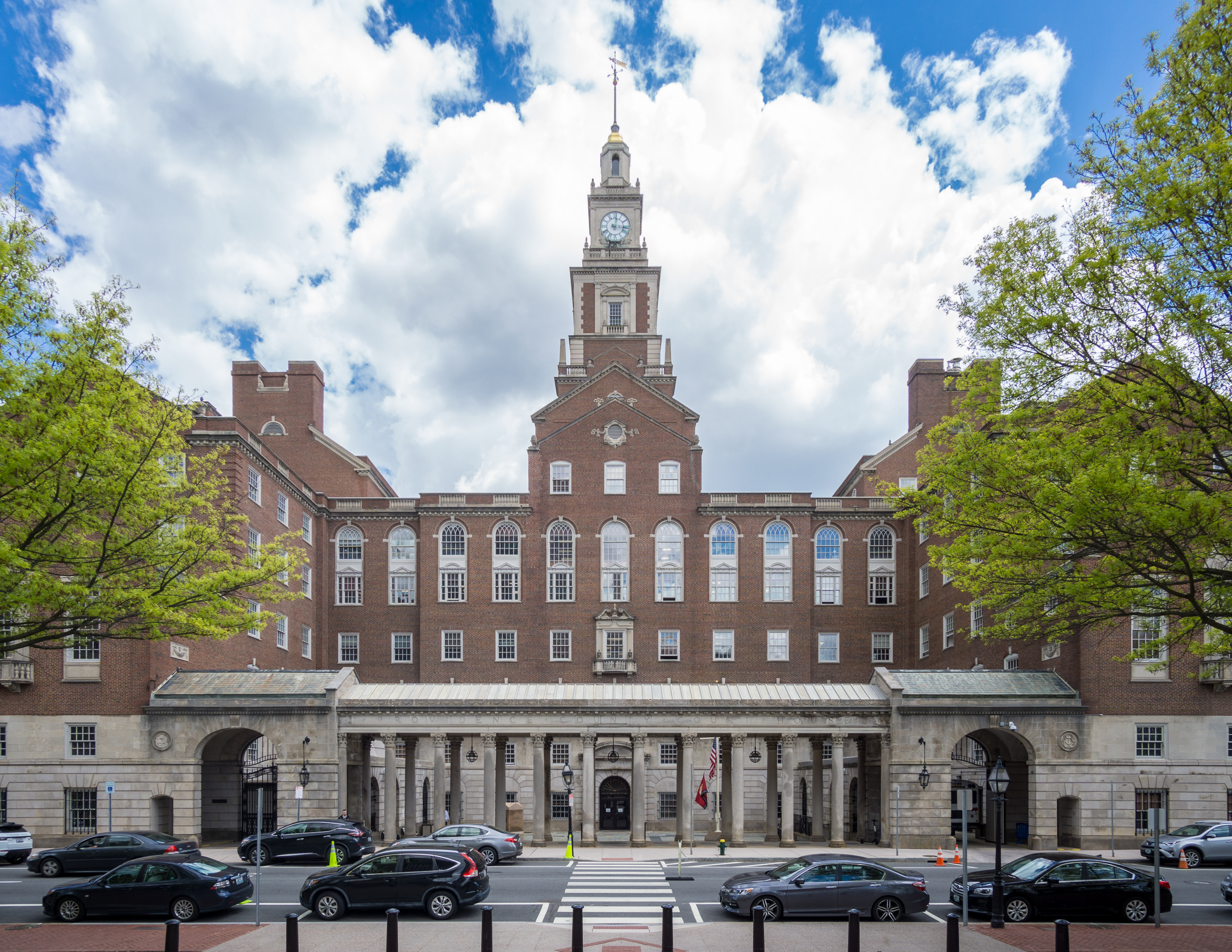
- Providence County Courthouse
- Coordinates: 41.87°N 71.58°W
- Country: United States
- State: Rhode Island
- Region: New England
- Metro area: Providence
- Formed: June 22, 1703; 323 years ago
- Named for: Providence, Rhode Island
- County town: Providence
- Largest city: Providence
- Incorporated municipalities: 16 (total): 6 cities, 10 towns

Area
  - Total: 436 sq mi (1,130 km^{2})
  - Land: 410 sq mi (1,100 km^{2})
  - Water: 26 sq mi (67 km^{2}) 6%
- Highest elevation: 812 ft (247 m)
- Lowest elevation: 0 ft (0 m)

Population (April 1, 2020)
  - Total: 660,741
  - Estimate (2025): 678,179 ▲
  - Density: 1,611/sq mi (622/km^{2})

GDP
  - Total: $42.588 billion (2022)
- Time zone: UTC−5 (EST)
  - Summer (DST): UTC−4 (EDT)
- ZIP Code format: 028xx, 029xx
- Area code: 401
- FIPS code: 44-007
- GNIS feature ID: 1219781
- Congressional district: 1st, 2nd

Providence County is the largest and most populous county in the U.S. state of Rhode Island. As of the 2020 census, the county's population was 660,741, or 60.2% of the state's population. Providence County contains the city of Providence, the state capital of Rhode Island and the county's (and state's) most populous city, with an estimated 190,934 residents in 2020. Providence County is included in the Providence metropolitan area, which in turn constitutes a portion of Greater Boston. As of 2010, the center of population in Rhode Island is located in Providence County, in the city of Cranston.

== History ==
Providence County was constituted on June 22, 1703, as the County of Providence Plantations. It consisted of five towns, namely Providence, Warwick, Westerly, Kingstown, and Greenwich and encompassed territory in present-day Kent and Washington counties. Washington County was split off as King's County in 1729, while Kent County was split off in 1750. The town of Cumberland was acquired from Massachusetts and added to Providence County in 1746–47, and the towns of East Providence and Pawtucket were made part of Providence County when the final border with Massachusetts was settled in 1862.

County government in Rhode Island was abolished in 1842. Providence County, like other counties in Rhode Island, has no governmental functions (other than as court administrative and sheriff corrections boundaries which are part of state government).

== Geography ==
According to the U.S. Census Bureau, the county has a total area of 436 square miles (1,130 km^{2}), of which 410 square miles (1,100 km^{2}) is land and 26 square miles (67 km^{2}) (6.0%) is water. It is the largest of Rhode Island's five counties by land area, but it's the smallest county in the United States that is a state's largest county. The county is drained by the Blackstone River, which runs partly along the east border, the Woonasquatucket River in the central part of the county, joining with the smaller Moshassuck River in downtown Providence, and the Pawtuxet, which forms a portion of the southeastern boundary of the county. The Pawtuxet is dammed in the western part of the county to form the Scituate Reservoir, which supplies drinking water for Providence and surrounding communities.

The highest natural point in the county and the state of Rhode Island is Jerimoth Hill at 812 feet (247 m). Sea level is the lowest point.

=== Adjacent counties ===
- Norfolk County, Massachusetts - northeast
- Bristol County, Massachusetts - east
- Bristol County - southeast
- Kent County - south
- Windham County, Connecticut - west
- Worcester County, Massachusetts - northwest

=== National protected areas ===
- Blackstone River Valley National Historical Park (part)
- Roger Williams National Memorial

=== Major highways ===
- I-95
- I-195
- I-295
- US 1
- US 1A
- US 6
- US 6A
- US 44
- Route 2
- Route 5
- Route 7
- Route 10
- Route 12
- Route 14
- Route 15
- Route 33
- Route 37
- Route 51
- Route 94
- Route 96
- Route 98
- Route 99
- Route 100
- Route 102
- Route 103
- Route 103A
- Route 104
- Route 107
- Route 108
- Route 114
- Route 114A
- Route 115
- Route 116
- Route 117
- Route 120
- Route 121
- Route 122
- Route 123
- Route 126
- Route 128
- Route 146
- Route 146A
- Route 152

== Demographics ==
Historical population
Census	Pop.	Note	%±
1790	24,376		—
1800	25,854		6.1%
1810	30,869		19.4%
1820	35,736		15.8%
1830	47,018		31.6%
1840	58,073		23.5%
1850	87,526		50.7%
1860	107,799		23.2%
1870	149,190		38.4%
1880	197,874		32.6%
1890	255,123		28.9%
1900	328,683		28.8%
1910	424,353		29.1%
1920	475,190		12.0%
1930	540,016		13.6%
1940	550,298		1.9%
1950	574,973		4.5%
1960	568,778		−1.1%
1970	580,261		2.0%
1980	571,349		−1.5%
1990	596,270		4.4%
2000	621,602		4.2%
2010	626,667		0.8%
2020	660,741		5.4%
2025 (est.)	678,179	▲	2.6%
U.S. Decennial Census; 1790-1960 1900-1990; 1990-2000 2010-2019

=== 2020 census ===
As of the 2020 census, the county had a population of 660,741. Of the residents, 20.2% were under the age of 18 and 16.1% were 65 years of age or older; the median age was 37.9 years. For every 100 females there were 94.1 males, and for every 100 females age 18 and over there were 91.7 males. 94.8% of residents lived in urban areas and 5.2% lived in rural areas.

The racial makeup of the county was 60.9% White, 8.1% Black or African American, 0.8% American Indian and Alaska Native, 4.3% Asian, 14.3% from some other race, and 11.5% from two or more races. Hispanic or Latino residents of any race comprised 24.3% of the population.

There were 260,366 households in the county, of which 28.6% had children under the age of 18 living with them and 32.4% had a female householder with no spouse or partner present. About 31.3% of all households were made up of individuals and 12.2% had someone living alone who was 65 years of age or older.

There were 276,770 housing units, of which 5.9% were vacant. Among occupied housing units, 52.0% were owner-occupied and 48.0% were renter-occupied. The homeowner vacancy rate was 1.1% and the rental vacancy rate was 4.8%.

Providence County, Rhode Island – Racial and ethnic composition Note: the US Census treats Hispanic/Latino as an ethnic category. This table excludes Latinos from the racial categories and assigns them to a separate category. Hispanics/Latinos may be of any race.
Race / Ethnicity (NH = Non-Hispanic)	Pop 2000	Pop 2010	Pop 2020	% 2000	% 2010	% 2020
White alone (NH)	458,622	414,326	378,615	73.78%	66.11%	57.30%
Black or African American alone (NH)	36,078	45,048	47,652	5.80%	7.18%	7.21%
Native American or Alaska Native alone (NH)	2,377	2,327	1,882	0.38%	0.37%	0.28%
Asian alone (NH)	17,813	22,621	28,110	2.86%	3.60%	4.25%
Pacific Islander alone (NH)	209	205	190	0.03%	0.03%	0.02%
Other race alone (NH)	7,790	8,084	9,367	1.25%	1.28%	1.41%
Mixed race or Multiracial (NH)	15,481	16,237	34,602	2.49%	2.59%	5.23%
Hispanic or Latino (any race)	83,232	117,819	160,323	13.38%	18.80%	24.26%
Total	621,602	626,667	660,741	100.00%	100.00%	100.00%

=== 2010 census ===
As of the 2010 United States census, there were 626,667 people, 241,717 households, and 149,691 families living in the county. The population density was 1,530.3 inhabitants per square mile (590.9/km^{2}). There were 264,835 housing units at an average density of 646.7 per square mile (249.7/km^{2}). The racial makeup of the county was 73.4% white, 8.5% black or African American, 3.7% Asian, 0.7% American Indian, 0.1% Pacific islander, 9.6% from other races, and 4.2% from two or more races. Those of Hispanic or Latino origin made up 18.8% of the population. The largest ancestry groups were:

- (Italy) 18.5% Italian
- (Republic of Ireland) 15.8% Irish
- (France) 12.3% French
- (England) 9.4% English
- (Portugal) 8.6% Portuguese
- (Quebec) 5.4% French Canadian
- (Dominican Republic) 5.4% Dominican
- (Puerto Rico) 4.9% Puerto Rican
- (Cape Verde) 4.3% Cape Verdean
- (Germany) 4.2% German
- (Poland) 3.8% Polish
- (Guatemala) 2.9% Guatemalan
- (Scotland) 1.7% Scottish
- (United States) 1.6% American
- (Sweden) 1.2% Swedish
- (Colombia) 1.2% Colombian
- (Mexico) 1.1% Mexican
- (Northern Ireland) 1.0% Scotch-Irish
- (Arab League) 1.0% Arab

Of the 241,717 households, 31.4% had children under the age of 18 living with them, 40.8% were married couples living together, 15.8% had a female householder with no husband present, 38.1% were non-families, and 30.2% of all households were made up of individuals. The average household size was 2.48 and the average family size was 3.11. The median age was 37.0 years.

The median income for a household in the county was $48,500 and the median income for a family was $61,265. Males had a median income of $44,964 versus $36,447 for females. The per capita income for the county was $25,169. About 11.6% of families and 15.4% of the population were below the poverty line, including 22.1% of those under age 18 and 11.5% of those age 65 or over.

=== 2000 census ===
As of the census of 2000, there were 621,602 people, 239,936 households, and 152,839 families living in the county. The population density was 1,504 inhabitants per square mile (581/km^{2}). There were 253,214 housing units at an average density of 613 per square mile (237/km^{2}). The racial makeup of the county was 78.38% White, 6.55% Black or African American, 0.51% Native American, 2.90% Asian, 0.07% Pacific Islander, 8.02% from other races, and 3.58% from two or more races. 13.39% of the population were Hispanic or Latino of any race. 19.0% were of Italian, 10.9% Irish, 8.1% French, 7.7% Portuguese, 7.2% French Canadian and 5.8% English ancestry according to Census 2000. 72.7% spoke English, 13.4% Spanish, 4.9% Portuguese, 2.5% French and 1.6% Italian as their first language.

There were 239,936 households, out of which 30.70% had children under the age of 18 living with them, 44.50% were married couples living together, 14.90% had a female householder with no husband present, and 36.30% were non-families. 29.80% of all households were made up of individuals, and 11.90% had someone living alone who was 65 years of age or older. The average household size was 2.48 and the average family size was 3.11.

In the county, the population was spread out, with 24.00% under the age of 18, 11.10% from 18 to 24, 29.80% from 25 to 44, 20.50% from 45 to 64, and 14.60% who were 65 years of age or older. The median age was 35 years. For every 100 females, there were 91.80 males. For every 100 females age 18 and over, there were 87.90 males.

The median income for a household in the county was $36,950, and the median income for a family was $46,694. Males had a median income of $35,336 versus $26,322 for females. The per capita income for the county was $19,255. About 11.90% of families and 15.50% of the population were below the poverty line, including 22.30% of those under age 18 and 12.70% of those age 65 or over.

Providence County is 71% Catholic, making it among the most Catholic counties in the country.

== Communities ==
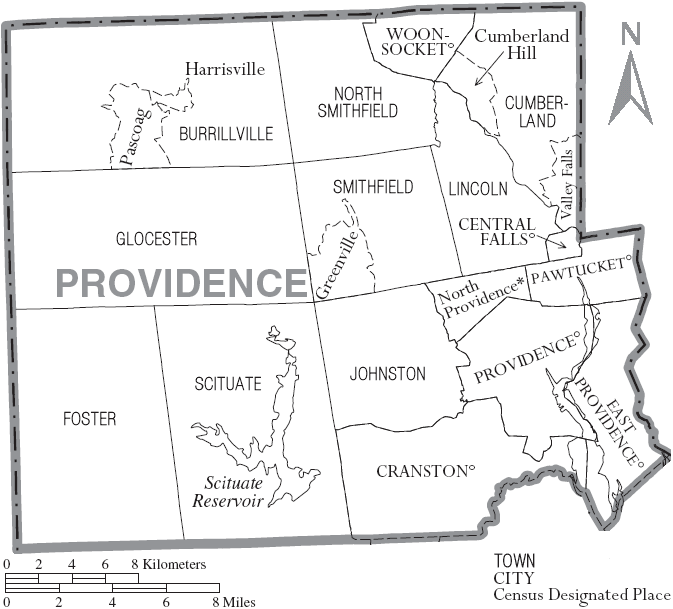
Map of Providence County, Rhode Island showing cities, towns, and CDPs

=== Cities ===
- Central Falls
- Cranston
- East Providence
- Pawtucket
- Providence (traditional county seat)
- Woonsocket

=== Towns ===
- Burrillville
- Cumberland
- Foster
- Glocester
- Johnston
- Lincoln
- North Providence
- North Smithfield
- Scituate
- Smithfield

=== Census-designated places ===
- Chepachet
- Clayville
- Cumberland Hill
- Foster Center
- Greenville
- Harmony
- Harrisville
- Pascoag
- Valley Falls

=== Other villages ===
- Albion
- Arnold Mills
- Branch Village
- Esmond
- Forestdale
- Georgiaville
- Glendale
- Lime Rock
- Lonsdale
- Manville
- Oakland
- Primrose
- Quinnville
- Riverside
- Rumford
- Saylesville
- Smithville-North Scituate
- Slatersville
- Union Village
- Waterford

=== Ghost town ===
Hanton City

== Politics ==
United States presidential election results for Providence County, Rhode Island
Year	Republican / Whig		Democratic		Third party(ies)	
Year	No.	%	No.	%	No.	%
1844	3,752	54.03%	3,192	45.97%	0	0.00%
1880	11,316	61.14%	6,975	37.69%	217	1.17%
1884	12,387	57.08%	8,491	39.13%	824	3.80%
1888	14,207	51.74%	12,440	45.30%	812	2.96%
1892	18,695	49.16%	18,203	47.86%	1,134	2.98%
1896	26,844	66.58%	11,644	28.88%	1,832	4.54%
1900	24,194	58.03%	15,223	36.51%	2,274	5.45%
1904	30,295	59.76%	18,557	36.60%	1,846	3.64%
1908	32,037	59.58%	18,880	35.11%	2,854	5.31%
1912	19,695	33.72%	23,127	39.59%	15,587	26.69%
1916	32,406	49.18%	31,314	47.52%	2,172	3.30%
1920	79,558	61.30%	45,859	35.33%	4,374	3.37%
1924	92,464	57.24%	62,336	38.59%	6,750	4.18%
1928	85,884	46.77%	97,185	52.92%	568	0.31%
1932	84,397	40.86%	118,546	57.40%	3,601	1.74%
1936	88,492	37.17%	131,218	55.12%	18,370	7.72%
1940	99,434	40.60%	145,236	59.30%	251	0.10%
1944	87,190	38.80%	137,216	61.06%	321	0.14%
1948	93,867	38.20%	149,254	60.73%	2,627	1.07%
1952	146,197	48.09%	157,592	51.84%	219	0.07%
1956	153,860	55.80%	121,861	44.20%	0	0.00%
1960	91,028	32.51%	189,014	67.49%	1	0.00%
1964	43,432	16.52%	219,465	83.48%	0	0.00%
1968	70,320	28.11%	169,246	67.64%	10,633	4.25%
1972	129,418	49.94%	129,232	49.87%	506	0.20%
1976	103,976	41.62%	144,805	57.96%	1,036	0.41%
1980	86,467	34.88%	126,808	51.15%	34,652	13.98%
1984	116,024	48.16%	124,109	51.52%	765	0.32%
1988	94,248	40.77%	135,927	58.80%	984	0.43%
1992	69,579	27.45%	125,358	49.46%	58,504	23.08%
1996	49,901	23.52%	134,866	63.58%	27,355	12.90%
2000	61,378	28.12%	142,469	65.26%	14,461	6.62%
2004	82,337	35.59%	144,811	62.60%	4,176	1.81%
2008	81,010	31.94%	167,442	66.02%	5,178	2.04%
2012	75,785	31.61%	159,520	66.53%	4,481	1.87%
2016	90,882	36.58%	142,899	57.51%	14,693	5.91%
2020	102,551	37.61%	165,012	60.52%	5,104	1.87%
2024	112,443	41.70%	150,102	55.66%	7,134	2.65%

As an urban county in the heavily liberal region of New England, Providence County is a Democratic stronghold. Richard Nixon is the last Republican presidential candidate to have won the county, doing so in his 1972 landslide. Even then, Nixon only carried it by a very narrow margin. Proving how Democratic this county is, Donald Trump is the first Republican presidential candidate to notch over 40% of the county's vote since 1988.

Gubernatorial elections results

Gubernatorial elections results
Year	Republican	Democratic	Third parties
2022	38.0% 67,439	58.8% 104,196	3.2% 5,671
2018	36.5% 72,247	53.9% 106,688	9.6% 19,189
2014	36.24% 61,519	43.16% 73,262	20.6% 34,969
2010	30.8% 55,258	27.46% 49,266	41.73% 74,862

United States Senate election results for Providence County, Rhode Island1
Year	Republican		Democratic		Third party(ies)	
Year	No.	%	No.	%	No.	%
2024	98,145	38.43%	156,457	61.26%	793	0.31%
2018	70,495	35.67%	126,669	64.09%	476	0.24%
2012	69,136	30.89%	154,123	68.86%	549	0.25%

United States Senate election results for Providence County, Rhode Island2
Year	Republican		Democratic		Third party(ies)	
Year	No.	%	No.	%	No.	%
2020	81,590	31.63%	175,783	68.16%	538	0.21%
2014	43,866	26.51%	121,097	73.17%	531	0.32%

== Education ==
School districts include

K-12:

- Burrillville School District
- Central Falls School District
- Cranston School District
- Cumberland School District
- East Providence School District
- Johnston School District
- Lincoln School District
- North Providence School District
- North Smithfield School District
- Pawtucket School District
- Providence School District
- Scituate School District
- Smithfield School District
- Woonsocket School District

Secondary:

- Foster-Glocester Regional School District

Elementary:

- Foster Elementary School District
- Glocester Elementary School District

There is a state-operated school: Rhode Island School for the Deaf.

== See also ==
- National Register of Historic Places listings in Providence County, Rhode Island
