= Rhode Island Route 102 =

State highway in Rhode Island, US

Route 102
- Victory Highway
- Route 102 highlighted in red

Route information
- Maintained by RIDOT
- Length: 44.4 mi (71.5 km)
- Existed: 1923–present

Major junctions
- South end: Route 1A in North Kingstown
- US 1 in North Kingstown; Route 4 in North Kingstown I-95 in Exeter; US 6 in Scituate; US 44 in Chepachet
- North end: Route 5 / Route 146A in Slatersville

Location
- Country: United States
- State: Rhode Island
- Counties: Washington, Kent, Providence

Highway system
- Rhode Island Routes
| ← Route 101 | → Route 103 |

Route 102 is a 44.4-mile-long (71.5 km) numbered state highway in the U.S. state of Rhode Island. Route 102 serves as a non-freeway beltway around the Providence metro area. It begins in the village of Wickford and travels through less developed areas of western Rhode Island. The route ends in the village of Slatersville.

Route 102 is one of the longer Rhode Island state highways, and is longer than the portion of Interstate 95 that runs through the state (43.5 miles).

== Route description ==
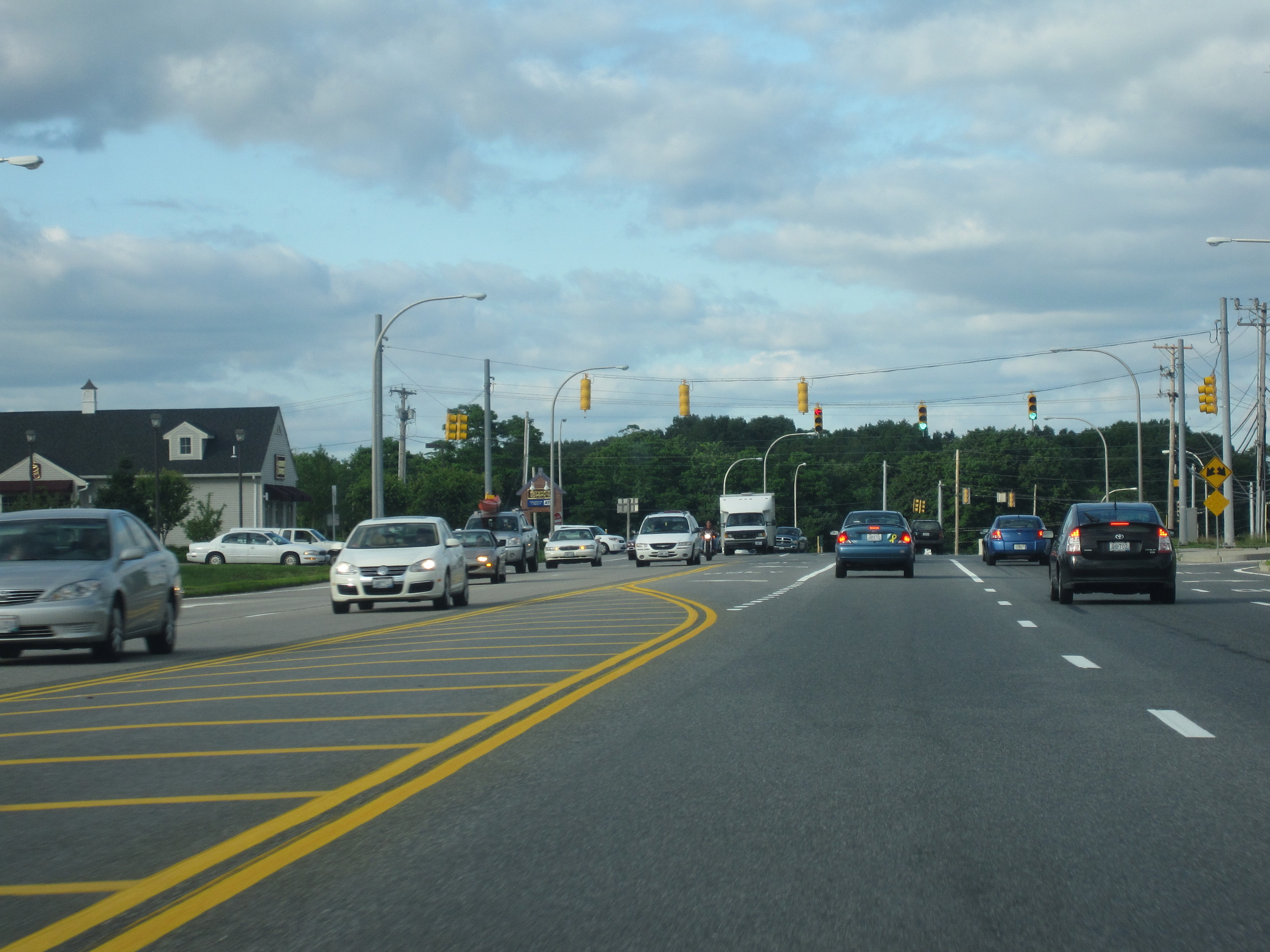
Route 102 in a commercial district of North Kingstown

Route 102 begins as Philips Street at Route 1A in the Wickford section of the town of North Kingstown on Narragansett Bay. It proceeds west through the town of Exeter along Ten Rod Road. Route 102 then turns northwest to follow Victory Highway as it goes through the towns of West Greenwich and Coventry. Route 102 soon enters the town of Foster, where it continues north and briefly overlaps with Route 14 (Plainfield Pike) through the town of Scituate. In Scituate, it continues north along Chopmist Hill Road, crossing US 6 as it heads towards the town of Glocester. After crossing US 44 in the Glocester village of Chepachet, Route 102 continues northeast into the town of Burrillville along Broncos Highway. The route ends in the town of North Smithfield in the village of Slatersville at an intersection with Routes 5 and 146A.

== History ==
Route 102 is an original Rhode Island route designation assigned in 1923. The original route extended beyond North Smithfield into the city of Woonsocket along Victory Highway and Great Road (modern Route 146A), then along South Main Street and Main Street to end at Route 122. The route was truncated to Route 146 (now Route 146A) by 1938.

== Major intersections ==
| County | Location | mi | km | Destinations | Notes |
|---|---|---|---|---|---|
| Washington | North Kingstown | 0.0 | 0.0 | Route 1A (Brown Street) | Southern terminus |
| Washington | North Kingstown | 0.6 | 0.97 | US 1 (Tower Hill Road) | |
| Washington | North Kingstown | 2.9 | 4.7 | Route 2 north (Quaker Lane) | Southern end of Route 2 concurrency |
| Washington | North Kingstown | 3.2 | 5.1 | Route 4 – Providence, Narragansett | Exit 3 (Route 4); partial cloverleaf interchange |
| Washington | North Kingstown | 3.9 | 6.3 | Route 2 south (South County Trail) | Northern end of Route 2 concurrency |
| Washington | Exeter | 11.2 | 18.0 | Route 3 south (Nooseneck Hill Road) | Southern end of Route 3 concurrency |
| Washington | Exeter | 11.3 | 18.2 | Route 3 north (Nooseneck Hill Road) | Northern end of Route 3 concurrency |
| Kent | West Greenwich | 12.1 | 19.5 | I-95 – Providence, Westerly | Exit 14 on I-95; cloverleaf interchange |
| Kent | Coventry | 18.0 | 29.0 | Route 118 east (Harkney Hill Road) | Western end of Route 118 |
| Kent | Coventry | 18.9 | 30.4 | Route 117 (Flat River Road) | |
| Providence | Foster | 22.2 | 35.7 | Route 14 west (Plainfield Pike) | Southern end of Route 14 concurrency |
| Providence | Foster | 25.1 | 40.4 | Route 94 north (Foster Center Road) | Southern end of Route 94 |
| Providence | Scituate | 26.8 | 43.1 | Route 12 east (Tunk Hill Road) | Western end of Route 12 |
| Providence | Scituate | 27.4 | 44.1 | Route 14 east (Plainfield Pike) | Northern end of Route 14 concurrency |
| Providence | Scituate | 29.8 | 48.0 | US 6 (North Scituate Bypass) | |
| Providence | Scituate | 30.9 | 49.7 | Route 101 (Old Hartford Pike) | |
| Providence | Chepachet | 35.6 | 57.3 | US 44 east (Putnam Pike) | Southern end of US 44 concurrency |
| Providence | Chepachet | 36.1 | 58.1 | US 44 west (Putnam Pike) | Northern end of US 44 concurrency |
| Providence | Chepachet | 36.3 | 58.4 | Route 100 north (Money Hill Road) to Route 98 | Southern end of Route 100 |
| Providence | Oakland | 39.9 | 64.2 | Route 107 west (East Avenue) | Eastern end of Route 107 |
| Providence | Nasonville | 41.8 | 67.3 | Route 7 (Douglas Turnpike) | |
| Providence | Slatersville | 44.4 | 71.5 | Route 5 (North Main Street) / Route 146A (Victory Highway) to Route 146 | Northern terminus |
1.000 mi = 1.609 km; 1.000 km = 0.621 mi: Concurrency terminus
