= U.S. Route 6 in Rhode Island =

Section of U.S. Highway in Rhode Island, United States

U.S. Route 6
- Grand Army of the Republic Highway
- US 6 highlighted in red

Route information
- Maintained by RIDOT
- Length: 26.5 mi (42.6 km)
- Existed: 1926–present

Major junctions
- West end: US 6 at the Connecticut state line
- I-295 / US 6A in Johnston; Route 10 in Providence; I-95 / Route 10 / Route 146 in Providence; US 44 / US 1A in Providence; I-195 / US 1A in East Providence
- East end: US 6 at the Massachusetts state line

Location
- Country: United States
- State: Rhode Island
- Counties: Providence

Highway system
- United States Numbered Highway System; List; Special; Divided; Rhode Island Routes
← Route 5	→ US 6A
← I-195	→ Route 214

U.S. Route 6 (US 6) is a major east–west road in the U.S. state of Rhode Island. Nationally, the route continues west to Bishop, California, and east to Provincetown, Massachusetts. In western Rhode Island, it forms part of one of several routes between Hartford, Connecticut, and Providence and was planned to be replaced by Interstate 84 (I-84). The part of I-84 that was built, from I-295 to Olneyville, is now part of US 6. At Olneyville, US 6 joins Route 10 and heads east toward Downtown, Providence, where it turns south on I-95 and east on I-195. US 6 splits from I-195 in East Providence, crossing into Massachusetts on Highland Avenue. The whole route of US 6 is a state highway maintained by the Rhode Island Department of Transportation (RIDOT).

== Route description ==
US 6 crosses from Killingly, Connecticut, into Foster just east of the end of the Governor John Davis Lodge Turnpike, formerly known as the Connecticut Turnpike (State Road 695). That part of US 6 was once the Foster and Scituate Turnpike, now called the Danielson Pike. It crosses Route 94 in Foster before crossing into Scituate.

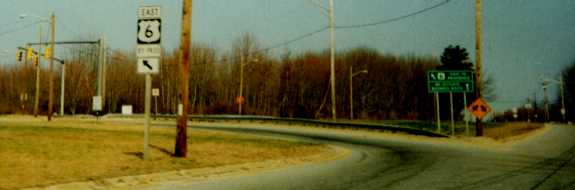
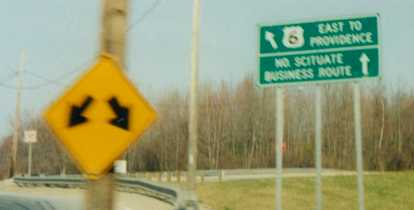
Signage at the eastbound business/bypass split marks the bypass as both "By-Pass" (top photo) and regular (bottom photo) US 6. The business route is marked as simply "Business Route" with no US 6 shield.

Soon after entering Scituate, US 6 splits into bypass and business alignments. The business alignment runs further south along the old turnpike and is mostly signed as US 6 without a banner. The bypass is signed mostly as US 6 Bypass (US 6 Byp.) on sign assemblies but as bannerless US 6 on green guide signs. Most maps and information takes US 6 along the bypass.

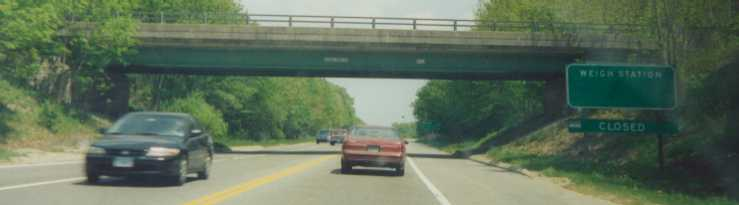
The bridge carrying Gleaner Chapel Road over the bypass

The business and bypass cross Route 102 soon after splitting. The western half of the bypass is a two-lane limited-access road, with one grade separation, under Gleaner Chapel Road, and one intersection, at Route 102. This newer section ends as it merges with Route 101, once the Rhode Island and Connecticut Turnpike, and now called Hartford Pike. The two parallel alignments cross the Scituate Reservoir and Route 116 before they merge near the east edge of Scituate. This merge was the east end of the Foster and Scituate Turnpike and was the east end of Route 101 until the early 2000s (when it was truncated to the merge with US 6 Byp.). (The Rhode Island and Connecticut Turnpike continued to the Olneyville section of Providence, where it is known as Hartford Avenue.)

Soon after the bypass and business routes merge, US 6 enters Johnston. Several miles later, it intersects with I-295. From I-295 to Olneyville, the old road—Hartford Avenue—is now US 6A, as US 6 uses the Dennis J. Roberts Expressway. To get there, it turns south on the I-295 collector–distributor roads to the west end of that freeway. The south interchange of US 6 and I-295 has numerous ramp stubs once intended for a western continuation of the Roberts Expressway as I-84.

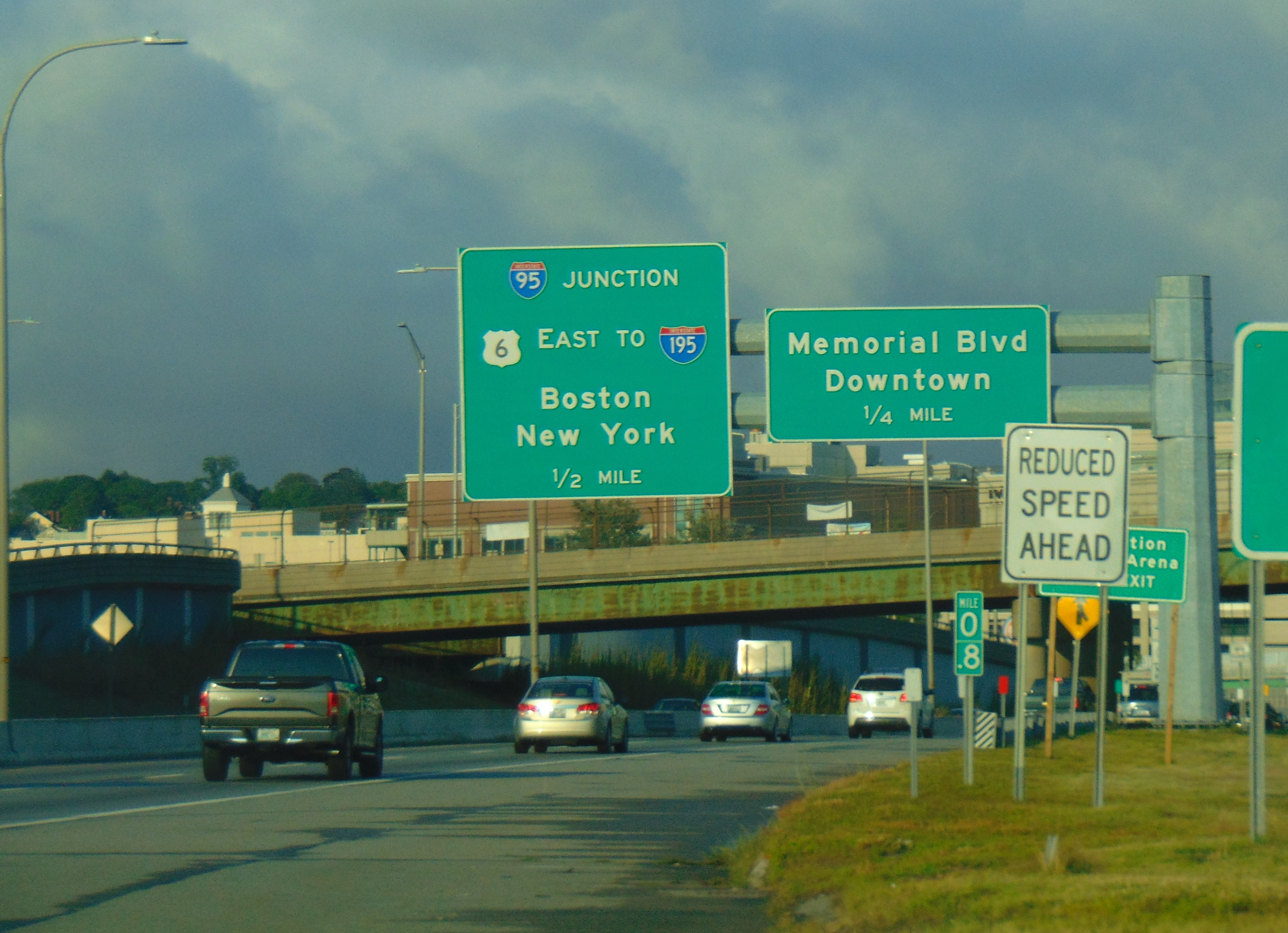
The sign for the intersection of US 6/Route 10 and I-95 in Downtown, Providence

The six-lane Roberts Expressway has interchanges with Route 5, US 6A, Route 128, and US 6A again on its way to Olneyville. It crosses from Johnston into Providence just west of the bridge over Route 128. At the second US 6A interchange, the older Olneyville Bypass begins, and the freeway reduces to four lanes. Heading around Olneyville to the south and east, US 6 has partial interchanges with Route 14, Route 10, and Broadway before merging with Route 10 toward Downtown, Providence, on the Route 6-10 Connector. Along the connector is an interchange with Dean Street before it (and Route 10) ends at I-95, with ramps to Memorial Boulevard for downtown access. US 6 turns south there with I-95. US 6 soon leaves I-95 for I-195, which takes it east across the south side of downtown. US 1A and US 44 join after it crosses the Providence River, and the four routes head east across the Washington Bridge over the Seekonk River.

Upon crossing the Washington Bridge, US 6 enters East Providence. US 44 leaves onto Taunton Avenue at the east end of the bridge, and Route 103—the old alignment of US 6—begins on Warren Avenue. (Some signs still mark Warren Avenue as US 6, but signs in both directions on US 6 keep it on I-195.) After interchanges with Broadway and Pawtucket Avenue—the latter carrying Route 114 in both directions and US 1A to the north—US 6 splits from I-195 at the interchange with Route 114 (East Shore Expressway). It takes the ramps toward Warren Avenue, which it uses most of the way to the state line before heading southeast on Highland Avenue to cross into Seekonk, Massachusetts.

== History ==

In Rhode Island, US 6 was originally New England Route 3 (Route 3) of the New England road marking system, designated in 1922. The part of Route 3 in Rhode Island ran roughly how US 6 does now; the main differences were in Scituate (where it used US 6 Bus.) and from Johnston east through Providence and East Providence (where it used US 6A, Broadway, Washington Street, Waterman Street, the old Red Bridge and Waterman Avenue, and then turned south on Pawtucket Avenue and east along current Route 103 to reach Massachusetts).

By the time Route 3 became US 6 in late 1926, it had been moved to use Waterman Avenue through East Providence to Massachusetts. (In Massachusetts, US 6 turned south on present Route 114A to reach its current alignment.) Waterman Street in Providence had become one-way eastbound by 1930; westbound US 6 came off the Red Bridge and turned north on River Street, west on South Angell Street and Angell Street, and south on Benefit Street.

At some point, possibly by 1929, US 6 had moved from the Red Bridge to the Washington Bridge. In Downtown Providence, it turned south on Main Street and east on Fox Point Boulevard (now I-195) to reach the bridge, taking Taunton Avenue (now US 44) into Massachusetts (where it turned south on present Route 114A).

US 6 was realigned to bypass downtown to the south via the Point Street Bridge by 1942. It came along Westminster Street from Olneyville, turning southeast on Winter Street (now Fricker Street) and Lockwood Street. A short one-way pair on Lockwood and Friendship streets (eastbound) and Pine and Summer streets (westbound) led to Point Street and over the bridge of the same name to the west end of Fox Point Boulevard. Upon coming off the Washington Bridge, instead of heading northeast on Taunton Avenue, it had been moved to the more direct Warren Avenue by 1942.

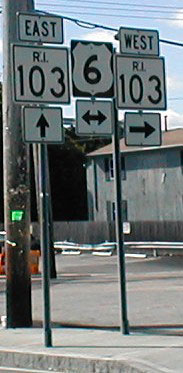
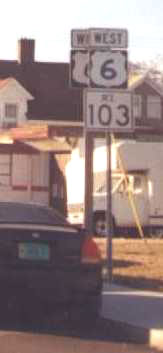
Many older signs along old US 6 (now mostly Route 103) in East Providence still mark it as US 6.

When the Olneyville Bypass opened in 1953, US 6 was rerouted to use it. Eastbound US 6 simply exited the bypass onto Westminster Street to rejoin its old route, but westbound US 6 used a totally different route. It turned northwest on Main Street instead of crossing the Point Street Bridge and turned west at Waterman Street to reach Promenade Street, then passing through the large rotary north of Union Station onto Kinsley Avenue. (Kinsley Avenue was later one-way eastbound in that area, so US 6 west continued on Promenade Street from the rotary, crossing to Kinsley Avenue somewhere to the west.

When the Broad Freeway—the section of I-195 south of downtown—opened in 1958, it replaced part of eastbound US 6. Instead of turning east on Point Street, US 6 instead continued northeast on Friendship Street to reach the freeway. In 1963 and 1964, I-95 was opened at the west end of I-195; the eastbound entrance from Friendship was slightly moved but otherwise remained the same. To the east of the Washington Bridge, the East Providence Expressway—another section of I-195—opened in 1959. Maps (and even some current signage) disagree about whether US 6 moved to the new bypass at that point or remained on Warren Avenue.

To the west of the Providence area, the three-lane bypass (one lane eastbound and two lanes westbound) of Scituate opened c. 1966. This road is signed with US 6 Byp. signs, while the old route is still signed as US 6.

=== Dennis J. Roberts Expressway ===
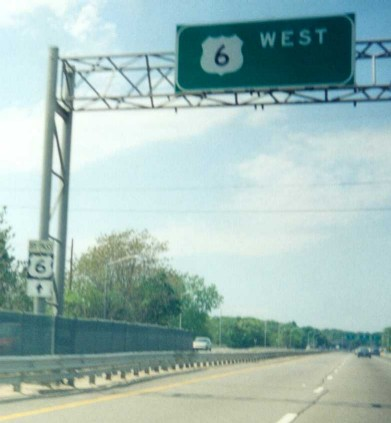
US 6 Byp. sign on the Roberts Expressway, now US 6

The Dennis J. Roberts Expressway opened in 1971, providing a bypass of US 6 from I-295 in Johnston east to Olneyville. However, US 6 was not moved to it, as it was part of the planned I-84 (approved in 1968). It was assigned the temporary designation of Rhode Island Route 195 (Route 195), as the planned I-84 would continue east from Olneyville to the west end of I-195. The freeway was also signed as US 6 Byp. However, I-84 was never completed, and in 1991 US 6 was moved to the freeway, with the old route redesignated US 6A.

In Downtown Providence, US 6 was moved in 1988 with the opening of the Route 6-10 Connector between Olneyville and downtown. US 6 was moved off the long one-way pair and onto the connector, turning south on I-95 and east on I-195. With the construction of the Iway, traffic was rerouted further south.

== Future ==
RIDOT has started renumbering exits along I-195. Exits on I-95 will be renumbered in 2022.

A plan has been proposed to close westbound exit 1D (Gano Street) and open a new exit, exit 1E (Waterfront Avenue), along I-195.

== Major intersections ==
RIDOT is in the process of renumbering exits from sequential numbering to a mileage-based system to conform with federal highway standards. Exits on the US 6 segments concurrent with I-95, I-195, and I-295 were renumbered. The exit numbers were signed with the three Interstates. The entire route is in Providence County.

Location	mi	km	Exit	Destinations	Notes
Foster	0.00	0.00		US 6 west (Providence Pike) to I-395 – Danielson, Hartford, Willimantic, Norwich	Continuation into Connecticut
Foster	3.30	5.31		Route 94 (Mount Hygeia Road / Foster Center Road) – Foster Center, Glocester	
Scituate	6.50	10.46		US 6 Bus. east (Danielson Pike) – Scituate	Western terminus of US 6 Bus.; eastbound exit and westbound entrance
Scituate	6.70	10.78		Route 102 (Chopmist Hill Road) – Coventry, Glocester	
Scituate	9.90	15.93		Route 101 west (Hartford Pike) – Foster	Westbound exit and eastbound entrance; eastern terminus of Route 101
Scituate	11.40	18.35		Route 116 (West Greenville Road) – Hope, Greenville	
Scituate	11.90	19.15		US 6 Bus. west (Danielson Pike) – Scituate	Eastern terminus of US 6 Bus.; eastbound exit and westbound entrance
Johnston	14.90	23.98	Western end of freeway section		
Johnston	14.90	23.98	9C	I-295 north / US 6A east (Hartford Avenue) – Woonsocket, North Attleborough, Johnston	Western end of I-295 concurrency; western terminus of US 6A
Johnston	15.30	24.62	9A	I-295 south – Warwick	Eastern end of I-295 concurrency
Johnston	16.40	26.39		Route 5 (Atwood Avenue) – Johnston	
Johnston	17.60	28.32		US 6A west (Hartford Avenue) – Johnston, Apponaug	Westbound exit and eastbound entrance
Johnston	17.90	28.81		Route 128 (Killingly Street) – Providence, Johnston	
Johnston			Truck-only electronic toll gantry ($5.00)		
Providence	19.10	30.74		US 6A west (Hartford Avenue) – Johnston	Eastern terminus of US 6A
Providence	19.70	31.70		Route 14 west (Plainfield Street)	Eastern terminus of Route 14; eastbound entrance only
Providence	19.75	31.78		Route 10 south – Cranston	Western end of Route 10 concurrency
Providence	20.00	32.19		Broadway – Olneyville Square	Eastbound exit only
Providence	20.20	32.51		Tobey Street / Harris Avenue	Westbound entrance only
Providence			-	Dean Street / Atwells Avenue / Providence Place	Southbound exit signed as I-95 exit 37D
Providence	20.90	33.64	37D	Providence Place	Westbound exit signed from I-95 north
Providence	21.20	34.12	37B	Memorial Boulevard – Downtown Providence	Westbound exit signed from I-95 north
Providence	21.30	34.28	37C	I-95 north to Route 146 north – Boston	Eastern terminus of Route 10; western end of I-95 concurrency
Providence	21.35	34.36	37A	Broadway	Westbound exit only
Providence	21.40	34.44	36B	I-95 south to US 1A – New York City I-195 begins	Eastern end of I-95 concurrency; western terminus of I-195; eastbound exit and westbound entrance
Providence	22.70	36.53	1A	Point Street	No eastbound exit
Providence	22.80	36.69	1B	I-95 south / Eddy Street – New York	Westbound exit and eastbound entrance; serves Rhode Island Hospital Trauma Center; exit 36B on I-95
Providence River	22.80– 23.00	36.69– 37.01	Providence River Bridge (Iway)		
Providence	23.10	37.18	1A	Gano Street / Portugal Parkway	Eastbound exit and westbound entrance
Providence	23.30	37.50	1C	US 44 west (South Main Street / US 1A south)	Western end of US 44/US 1A concurrency; westbound exit and eastbound entrance
Providence	23.70	38.14	1D	Gano Street – India Point	Westbound exit and entrance
Seekonk River	23.70– 23.90	38.14– 38.46	Washington Bridge		
East Providence	23.90	38.46	1E	Waterfront Avenue	Proposed westbound exit
East Providence	23.95	38.54	1	US 44 east (Taunton Avenue) – Riverside	Eastern end of US 44 concurrency; eastbound exit and westbound entrance; signed as exits 1B (Riverside) and 1C (US 44)
East Providence	24.00	38.62	1D	Route 103 east (Warren Avenue)	Western terminus of Route 103; eastbound exit and westbound entrance
East Providence	24.50	39.43	2A	Warren Avenue (unsigned Route 103) / Broadway / Pawtucket Avenue (unsigned Route 114) – East Providence	Signed as exit 2 westbound; also signed for US 44 and Route 103 westbound
East Providence	25.40	40.88	2B	To Route 114 south – East Providence, Barrington, Warren, Bristol	Eastbound exit and westbound entrance
East Providence	25.50	41.04	2C	I-195 east – Fall River MA	Eastern end of I-195 concurrency; eastbound exit and westbound entrance
East Providence	25.50	41.04	Eastern end of freeway section		
East Providence	25.70	41.36		US 1A north (Warren Avenue) to Route 114 north (Pawtucket Avenue)	Eastern end of US 1A concurrency
East Providence	26.50	42.65		US 6 east (Highland Avenue) – Seekonk	Continuation into Massachusetts
1.000 mi = 1.609 km; 1.000 km = 0.621 mi: Concurrency terminus; Incomplete access; Unopened

== Related routes ==
There are three special routes of US 6 in the state of Rhode Island: US 6 Bus. and US 6 Byp. in Scituate and US 6A in Johnston and Providence.

=== Danielson Pike ===
Danielson Pike
- Location: Foster—Scituate
- Length: 11.83 mi (19.04 km)

Danielson Pike, formerly known as the Foster and Scituate Turnpike, runs concurrent with US 6 and US 6 Bus. in Foster and Scituate.

Major intersections
The entire route is in Providence County.

Location	mi	km	Destinations	Notes
Foster	0.00	0.00	US 6 west (Providence Pike) to I-395 – Danielson, Hartford, Willimantic, Norwich	US 6 continues west into Connecticut
Foster	3.30	5.31	Route 94 (Mont Hygeia Road / Foster Center Road) – Foster Center, Glocester	
Scituate	6.50	10.46	US 6 east (North Scituate Bypass) – Providence	US 6 continues east; western terminus of US 6 business; eastbound exit and westbound entrance
Scituate	6.70	10.78	Route 102 (Chopmist Hill Road) to US 6 – Coventry, Glocester	
Scituate	11.12	17.90	Route 116 (West Greenville Road) – Hope, Greenville	
Scituate	11.83	19.04	US 6 (Hartford Avenue) – Providence	Eastern terminus of US 6 Business; no access to US 6 west
1.000 mi = 1.609 km; 1.000 km = 0.621 mi: Incomplete access; Route transition

U.S. Route 6
Previous state: Connecticut	Rhode Island	Next state: Massachusetts
