= Quinnville, Rhode Island =

Village in Lincoln, Rhode Island, U.S.

Coordinates: 41°56′2.24″N 71°25′59″W

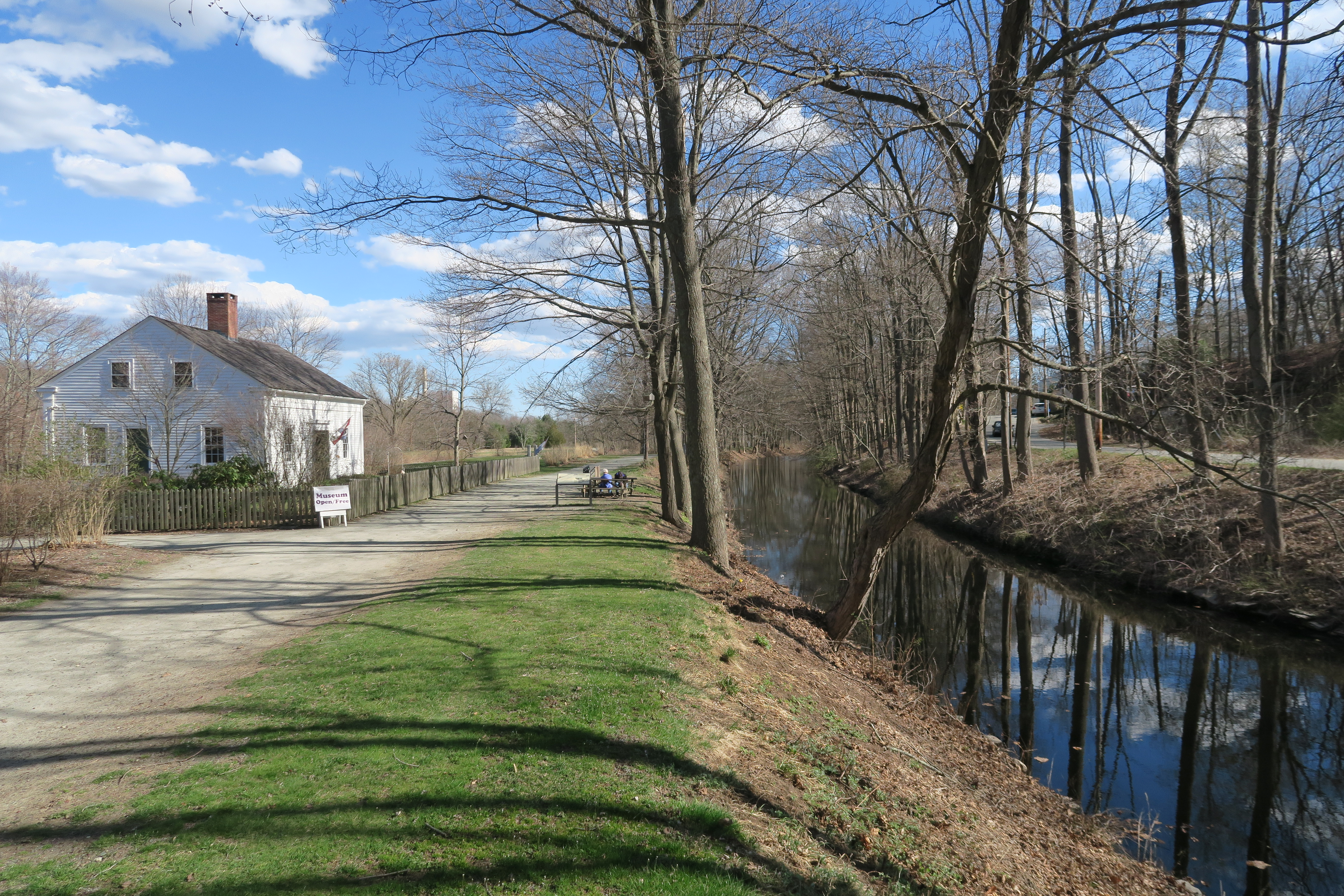
Blackstone Canal

Quinnville is a village incorporated into the Town of Lincoln, Rhode Island, United States. It is the smallest of the seven villages within Lincoln, bordered by the villages of Albion at the north, Limerock to the west, Lonsdale to the south, and by the Blackstone River to the east.

== Transportation ==
The Blackstone Canal flows through the length of the village, west of the Blackstone River. There is a former control gate at the northern end of the village, accessible by the former tow path for the canal. This gate was built by the Lonsdale Company to control the flow of water into the Canal in 1903, at which time this portion of the Canal was no longer used for transportation, but was providing water for power and processing at the Lonsdale Mills, approximately three miles downstream. There are two bridges within the village to cross the canal; one in the Blackstone River Bikeway state park to access parking for the bikeway, and another at Martin Street to cross both the canal and river into Cumberland.

== History ==
Quinnville, like many of the villages in Rhode Island, is a former mill village. Historically, the area currently known as Quinnville was incorporated into the Town of Cumberland, Rhode Island as part of the village of Ashton, connected by a bridge across the Blackstone River. Both banks of the river were home to textile mills and homes for the mill workers. The mill on what is currently the Quinnville side of the river was demolished in the early twentieth century, while the Ashton Mill is still standing and is currently renovated housing.

== Public Safety ==
Quinnville has its own fire department, as do all villages in Lincoln with the exception of Fairlawn, which is dispatched centrally by the Lincoln Police Department. Quinnville Station 7 is a volunteer-run fire station housing Lincoln fire apparatus Engine 7.
