= Bog Meadow Pond =

Source of drinking water in Highlands, NY

Coordinates: 41°23′21″N 74°0′46″W

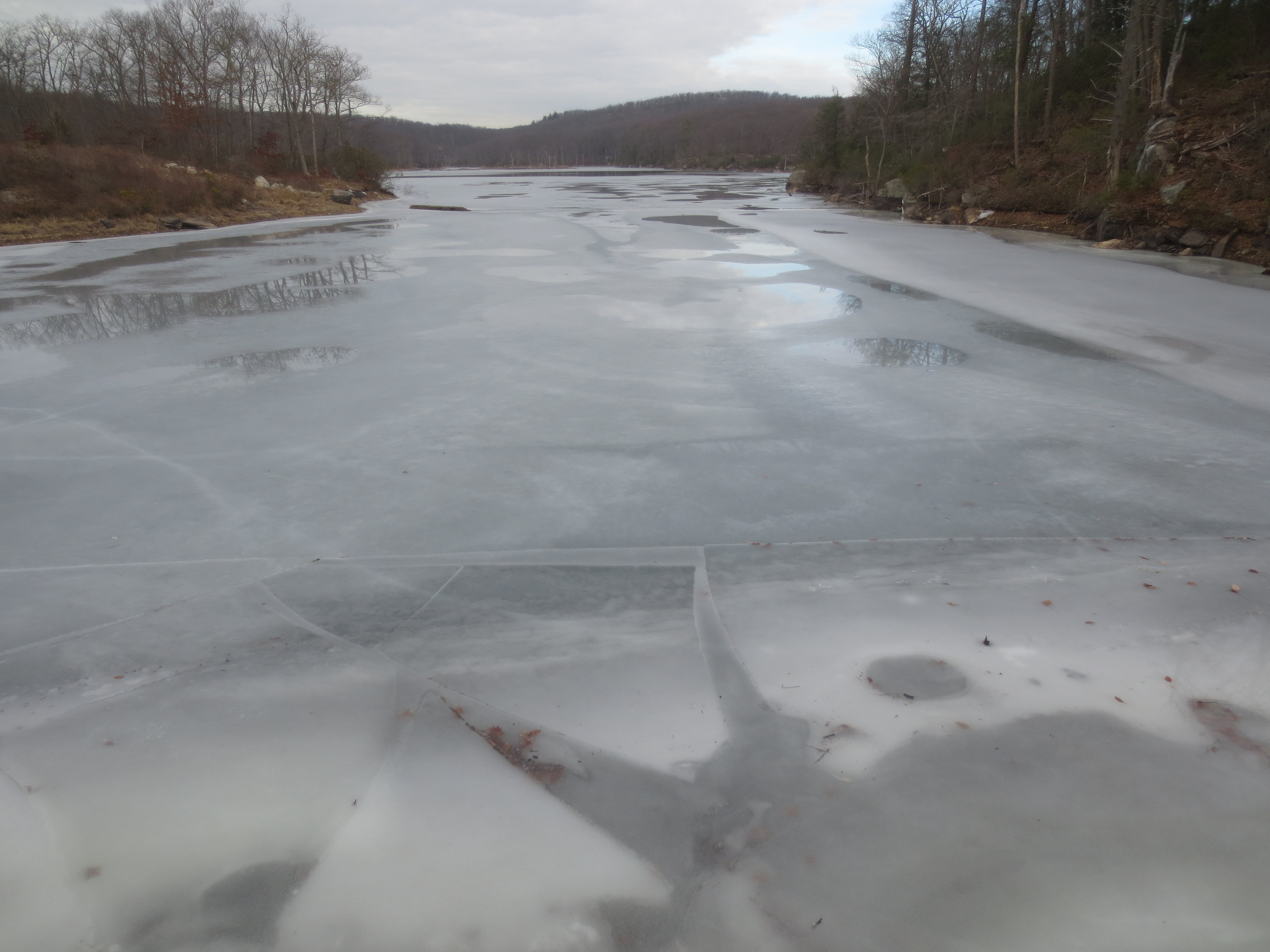
Bog Meadow Pond (March 2023)

Bog Meadow Pond is owned and maintained by the Village of Highland Falls in the Town of Highlands, Orange County New York, United States. It is the primary source of drinking water for Highland Falls and parts of the Town of Highlands.

== History ==
Bog Meadow Pond was originally a natural body of water located in the northern part of the Town of Highlands, just north of Rt 293, and approximate elevation is 1,142 feet. The pond's water level was raised with two dam projects. The first was completed in 1909 and the second in 1996.

In the early 1900s, the Citizens Water Works Company provided water to the Village of Highland Falls. Its primary water sources included Bog Meadow Pond and streams and tributaries flowing into Buttermilk Falls Brook (now called the Highland Brook).

Control of those water sources came into question, in March 1931, when congress passed a Bill to authorize and fund the purchase of most of the Town of Highlands and parts of the Town of Cornwall and Woodbury to expand the military reservation for the United States Military Academy (USMA) at West Point. The Bill describes the land and locations to be acquired and the amount of funding. The Bill also describe how the water supply and infrastructure of the Town of Highlands should not be impacted:

"Provided that nothing herein contained shall adversely affect the existing water supply, its sources, or pipe lines of the town of Highlands, New York".

After legal proceedings from 1942 to 1949 with the Federal government, the Village of Highland Falls was able to maintain control and purchase 154 acres around and including Bog Meadow Pond.

== Bog Meadow Watershed ==
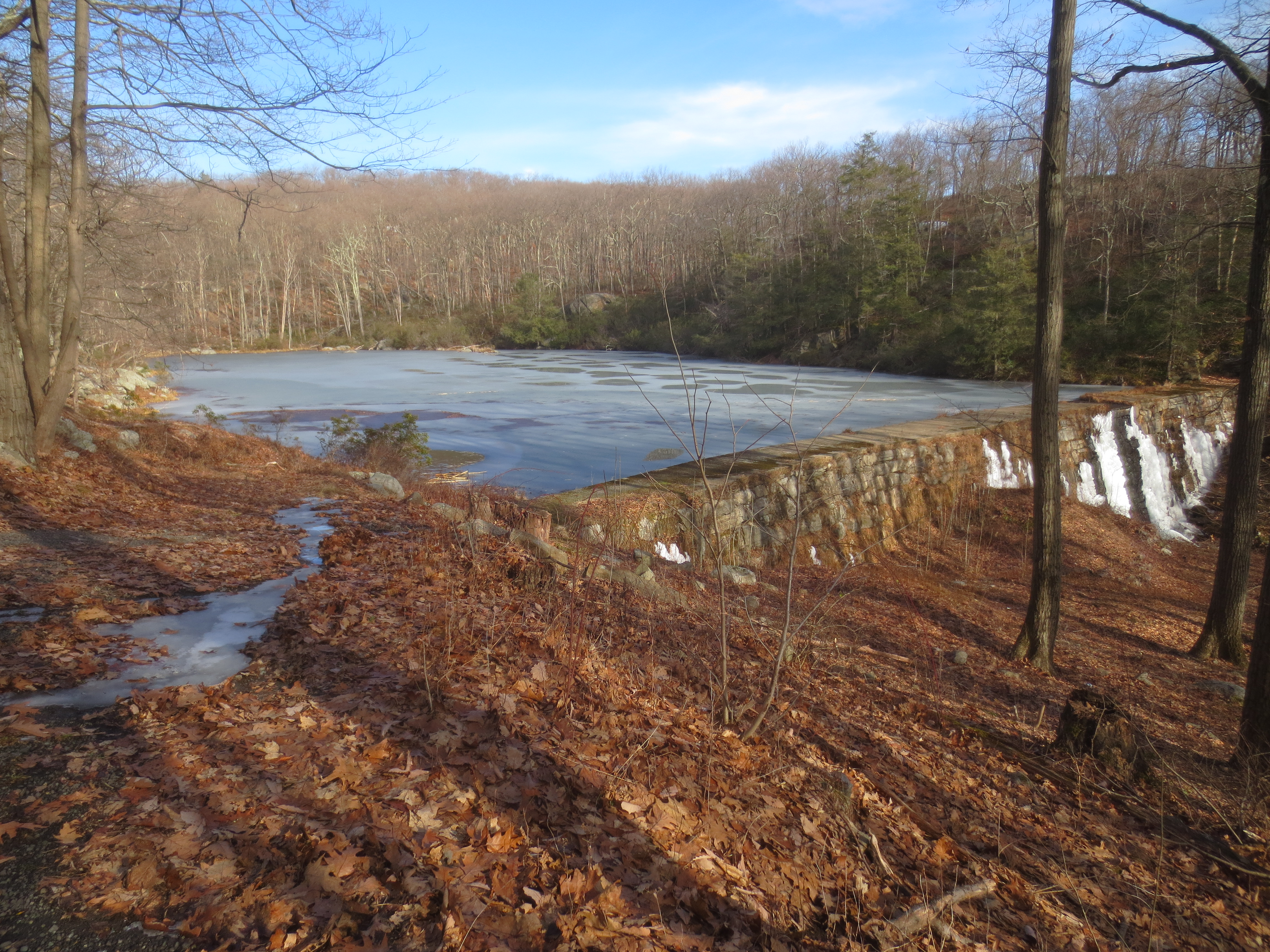
Little Bog Meadow Pond (March 2023)

The Bog Meadow Watershed is made up of Bog Meadow Pond, Jim's Pond and surrounding wetlands and tributaries. Jim's Pond is in the Town of Highlands and owned by the Palisades Interstate Park Commission and is part of the Black Rock Forest. Bog Meadow Pond and Jim's Pond flow into Little Bog Meadow Pond. These three ponds make up the majority of water sources for the Highland Brook that feed into the village water treatment plant.
