= Rhode Island Route 101 =

State highway in Providence County, Rhode Island, US

Route 101
- Hartford Pike

Route information
- Maintained by RIDOT
- Length: 9.7 mi (15.6 km)
- Existed: 1935–present

Major junctions
- West end: Route 101 at the Connecticut state line in Foster
- Route 102 in Scituate
- East end: US 6 in Scituate

Location
- Country: United States
- State: Rhode Island
- Counties: Providence

Highway system
- Rhode Island Routes
← Route 100	→ Route 102

Route 101 is a numbered state highway running 9.7 miles (15.6 km) in Rhode Island. It runs from the Connecticut state line east to U.S. Route 6 (US 6) in the town of Scituate.

== Route description ==
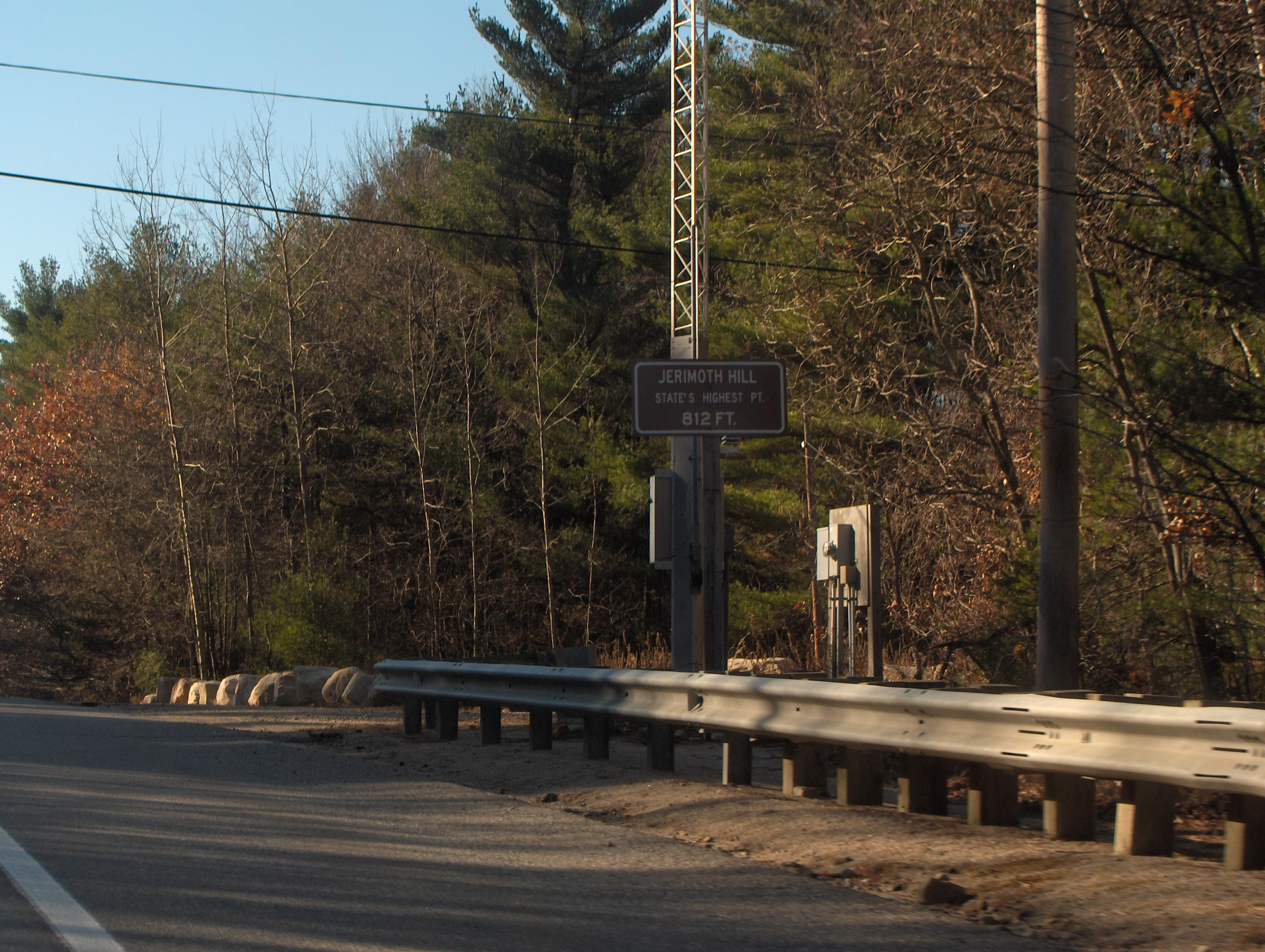
The Jerimoth Hill sign as it stands along Route 101 near the highest point in Rhode Island

Route 101 begins at the Connecticut state line between the towns of Killingly and Foster as a continuation of Connecticut Route 101. The route, known locally as Hartford Pike, runs for about 12 miles (19 km) through several reservoirs before ending at US 6 Bypass in the town of Scituate, near the north edge of the Scituate Reservoir. Route 101 passes near Jerimoth Hill, the highest point in Rhode Island.

== History ==
In the 19th century, modern Route 101 was a toll road that was administered by the Rhode Island and Connecticut Turnpike corporation. The former turnpike route was not assigned a route number in 1923 when the state first designated route numbers. At the time, the Route 101 designation was assigned to what is now US 44. In 1934, US 44 was designated by AASHO along its current alignment. Connecticut and Rhode Island reassigned the Route 101 designation by the following year to the Rhode Island and Connecticut Turnpike route and its continuation in Connecticut.

Until 2003, eastbound signage clearly showed Route 101 beginning concurrent with the US 6 Bypass, from the eastern split of US 6 Business (Danielson Pike) and US 6 Bypass in Scituate. Signage westbound at that intersection has now been changed to say "TO Route 101", leading to the belief that the western terminus is now the split between Hartford Pike and the US 6 Bypass, where the concurrency ended.

== Major intersections ==
The entire route is in Providence County.

Location	mi	km	Destinations	Notes
Foster	0.0	0.0	Route 101 west (Hartford Pike)	Continuation into Connecticut
Foster	1.9	3.1	Route 94 (Reynolds Road)	
Scituate	6.3	10.1	Route 102 (Chopmist Hill Road)	
Scituate	9.7	15.6	US 6 east (Hartford Pike)	Eastern terminus
1.000 mi = 1.609 km; 1.000 km = 0.621 mi
