= Rhode Island Route 14 =

State highway in Rhode Island, US

Route 14
- Plainfield Pike
- Route 14 highlighted in red

Route information
- Maintained by RIDOT
- Length: 23.1 mi (37.2 km)

Major junctions
- West end: Route 14 / Route 14A at the Connecticut state line
- I-295 in Cranston
- East end: US 6 in Providence

Location
- Country: United States
- State: Rhode Island
- Counties: Kent, Providence

Highway system
- Rhode Island Routes
← Route 12	→ Route 15

Route 14 is a numbered state highway in the U.S. state of Rhode Island. It runs approximately 23 miles (37 km) from Connecticut routes 14 and 14A at the border with Sterling, Connecticut, to Route 6 in Providence.

== Route description ==
Route 14 starts at the Connecticut border at an intersection with Connecticut routes 14 and 14A. It runs northeast past the northern terminus of Route 117, and then turns north at an intersection with Rhode Island Route 102. It runs concurrent with Route 102 for a while, and crosses two arms of the Scituate Reservoir on causeways. Route 14 continues east and intersects I-295 at exit 4, then continues towards downtown Providence before ending at the US 6 expressway near the Huntington Expressway.

== History ==
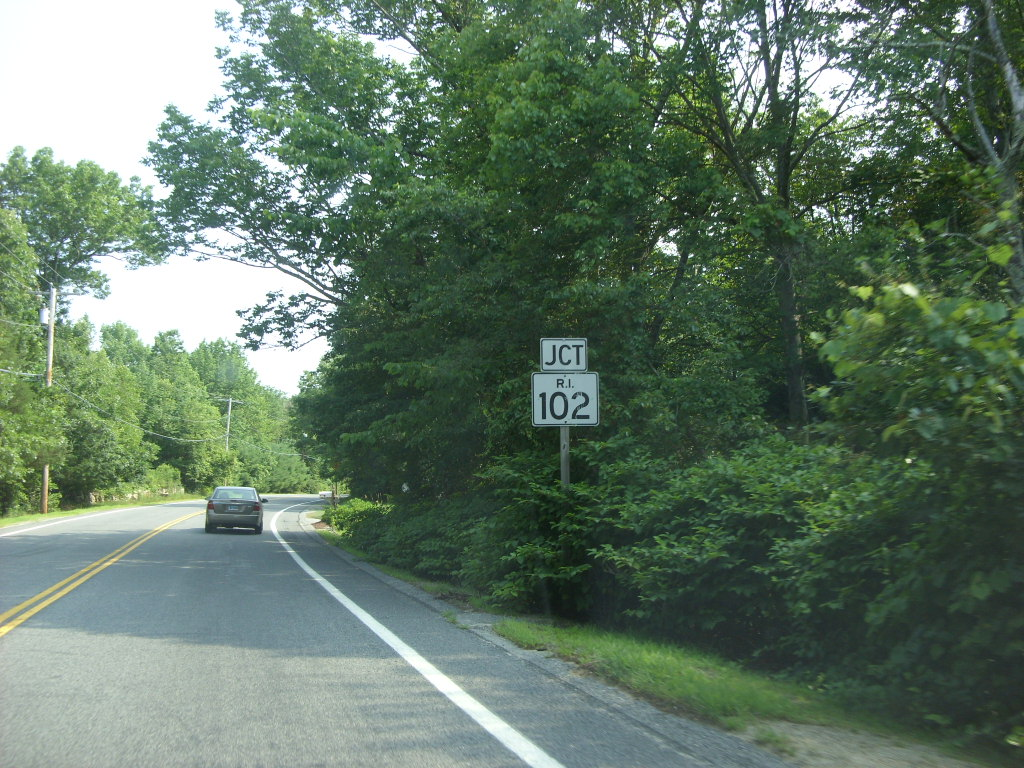
Junction Route 102 along Route 14

Route 14 roughly follows the historic Providence and Norwich Turnpike, later renamed to "Plainfield Pike." The only deviation from the original road occurs in Scituate, where approximately 1.5 miles (2.4 km) of original route have been bypassed. Half of this bypassed road is currently submerged under the Scituate Reservoir. Known as "Old Plainfield Pike," the bypassed section can still driven by car from its starting point at Route 102 to Route 12. Beyond Route 12, the original road continues as a paved path. This path extends for approximately .25 miles until reaching the Scituate Reservoir, where it remains underwater for approximately a mile. Emerging on the northeast side of the Reservoir, the path continues for 0.25 miles before rejoining Route 14. The pavement between Route 12 and the Reservoir, and between the Reservoir and Route 14 on the northeast side, is believed to be original from before the Reservoir was created.

== Major intersections ==
County	Location	mi	km	Destinations	Notes
Kent	Coventry	0.0	0.0	Route 14 west / Route 14A west	Continuation into Connecticut
Kent	Coventry	1.8	2.9	Route 117 east (Flat River Road)	Western terminus of Route 117
Providence	Foster	5.4	8.7	Route 102 south (Victory Highway)	Western end of Route 102 concurrency
Providence	Foster	8.4	13.5	Route 94 north (Foster Center Road)	Southern terminus of Route 94
Providence	Scituate	10.0	16.1	Route 12 east (Tunk Hill Road)	Western terminus of Route 12
Providence	Scituate	10.6	17.1	Route 102 north (Chopmist Hill Road)	Eastern end of Route 102 concurrency
Providence	Scituate	15.1	24.3	Route 116 (East Road)	
Providence	Johnston–Cranston line	19.0	30.6	I-295	Exit 6 on I-295; partial cloverleaf interchange
Providence	Johnston–Cranston line	20.3	32.7	Route 5 (Atwood Avenue)	
Providence	Providence	22.9	36.9	US 6 to I-95 / Route 10	Eastern terminus; partial diamond interchange
1.000 mi = 1.609 km; 1.000 km = 0.621 mi
