= Olive Winchester =

American ordained minister, biblical scholar and theologian

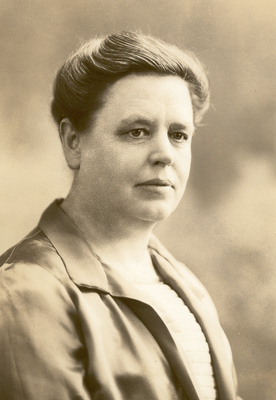
- Born: Olive May Winchester; November 22, 1879; Monson, Maine, U.S.
- Died: February 15, 1947 (aged 67); Pasadena, California, U.S.
- Occupations: Biblical studies professor, ordained minister
- Years active: 1902-1947

Olive May Winchester (November 22, 1879 – February 15, 1947) was an American ordained minister and a pioneer biblical scholar and theologian in the Church of the Nazarene, who was in 1912 the first woman ordained by any trinitarian Christian denomination in the United Kingdom, the first woman admitted into and graduated from the Bachelor of Divinity course at the University of Glasgow, and the first woman to complete a Doctor of Theology degree from the divinity school of Drew University.

== Early life ==
Olive May Winchester was born on November 22, 1879, in Monson, Maine, the oldest child of lawyer Charles B. Winchester (born August 8, 1851, in Corinna, Maine; died October 2, 1892, in Yankton, South Dakota), and Sarah A. "Sadie" Blackstone Winchester (born May 1, 1853, in Pownal, Maine; died February 6, 1949, in Los Angeles, California). Winchester's parents were married in Portland, Maine, on February 22, 1879, in the Methodist Episcopal Church. Winchester was a relative of Oliver Fisher Winchester (born November 30, 1810, in Brookline, Massachusetts; died December 11, 1880, in New Haven, Connecticut), the manufacturer and marketer of the Winchester repeating rifle.

After June 25, 1880, the Winchester family left Monson, Maine, and by 1881 had relocated to Forestburg, in Sanborn County in Dakota Territory, where Charles taught school at upper Forestburg from its opening on November 7, 1881, until a permanent replacement started on December 26, 1881. Winchester's younger sister, Edith Elizabeth Winchester (born June 22, 1884, in Forestburg, Dakota Territory; died August 1885 in Forestburg) died in infancy. By 1885 Charles Winchester was practicing as an attorney at law and land agent. In April 1886 Charles Winchester purchased The Woonsocket Times and relocated it to Forestburg. After 1886 the Winchester family moved to the former territorial capital of Yankton, and later purchased a small hotel. By November 1889 the Winchester family had moved to Montana Street, in Huron, South Dakota. On October 2, 1892, Charles Winchester was killed after an explosion in his hotel after he was spraying a room for bedbugs, and is interred at the Yankton City Cemetery.

After the death of her father, Winchester and her mother moved to Lynn, Massachusetts. In 1895 Winchester became a Christian and later became an early member of the Association of Pentecostal Churches of America, a holiness denomination established in 1895, which subsequently merged with the Church of the Nazarene established by Phineas Bresee to form the Pentecostal Church of the Nazarene in 1907.

=== Radcliffe Ladies College (1898-1902) ===
In 1898 Winchester enrolled in Radcliffe Ladies College, which was then a division of Harvard University. As a consequence of a $25,000 inheritance from the estate of her relative Oliver Fisher Winchester, Winchester was able to finance her own education.

While studying at Radcliffe, Winchester preached often. The Beulah Christian reported in March 1902 that on one occasion "Sister Olive Winchester, a member of this church, and senior at Radcliffe College, spoke at the morning service with special unction. More than a dozen souls were at the altar."

On June 24, 1902, Winchester graduated cum laude from Radcliffe with a Bachelor of Arts (A.B.) degree, where she majored in Hebrew and Arabic. According to Nazarene historian Stan Ingersol, Winchester's Harvard instructor in Semitic languages regarded her as "a student of exceptional ability."

== Ministry and further education ==
=== Pentecostal Collegiate Institute (1902-1909) ===
After graduation from Radcliffe College in 1902, Winchester taught at the Pentecostal Collegiate Institute (now Eastern Nazarene College) located at North Scituate, Rhode Island. Winchester travelled frequently on behalf of the college, raising money and holding services in small communities that lacked regular church services. Winchester reported that she had been entirely sanctified in 1902.

Winchester never married, although former student Ross E. Price maintains that she was engaged to Ernest W. Perry, the dean of the Pentecostal Collegiate Institute (PCI), who drowned on Sunday November 23, 1902 before their engagement had been made public. Price claimed that "I know I am right that she was engaged to the young man. And I know that when he drowned she then decided never to marry but to give herself to teaching."

On June 28, 1908, Winchester arrived in Glasgow as a passenger on the SS California. On September 2, 1908, Winchester departed Southampton, England, on the SS Majestic, arriving in New York on September 10, 1908. Winchester taught at PCI until 1909 before moving to Glasgow to study at the divinity school of the University of Glasgow.

=== Parkhead Holiness Bible School (1909–1913) ===
Winchester arrived in Liverpool, England on September 14, 1909, on the RMS Lusitania, accompanied by Rev. George Sharpe, the founder of the Pentecostal Church of Scotland, an indigenous holiness denomination later to merge with the Pentecostal Church of the Nazarene in 1915.

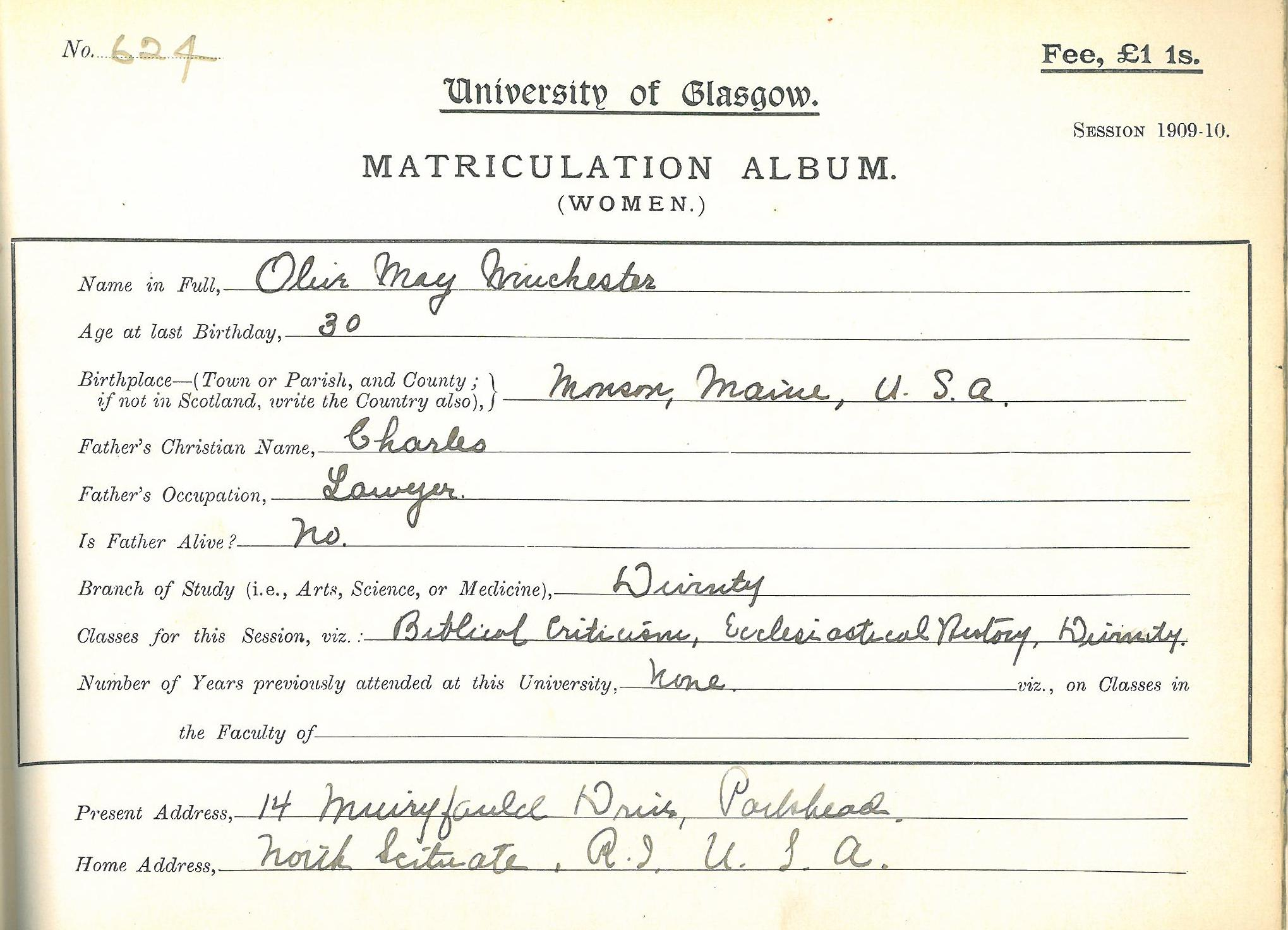
Olive Winchester's matriculation slip at University of Glasgow (1909)

In 1909 Winchester broke a gender barrier as the first woman matriculated into the Bachelor of Divinity course at the University of Glasgow. However, according to Ingersol, "More impressive was her record at the University of Glasgow, Scotland." During this time Winchester won the Cook and McFarlan Testimonial Prize of £21, awarded annually since 1847 in memory of Duncan Macfarlan, DD, Principal of the University of Glasgow (1823 to 1858), and George Cook, DD, Professor of Moral Philosophy in the University of St Andrews, to "the most distinguished candidate in Greek, Moral Philosophy, Hebrew, Ecclesiastical History and Divinity."

While in Scotland, Winchester became a member of the Pentecostal Church of Scotland. From 1909 Winchester also taught in that denomination's Parkead Holiness Bible School. On April 30, 1910, Winchester departed from Glasgow on the S.S. Cassandra, and subsequently arrived in Quebec, Canada on May 10, 1910, en route to the USA. On May 11, 1910, Winchester "advocated that a holiness periodical and college be organized to help perpetuate and strengthen the holiness work in Scotland."

Winchester arrived in Glasgow on September 10, 1910, on the SS Cassandra after embarking in Montreal, Quebec, Canada. On April 18, 1911, Winchester departed from Liverpool on the SS Franconia and arrived in Boston, Massachusetts, on April 26, 1911. Winchester and her mother arrived in Liverpool on September 10, 1911, on the SS Salaga from New York.

In April 1912 Winchester graduated with a Bachelor of Divinity degree from the University of Glasgow with honours, including the Cleland and Rae-Wilson Gold Medal for Ecclesiastical History, named for William Rae Wilson, and awarded annually to the most distinguished student in Ecclesiastical History. Winchester also received the Jamieson Prize of £10, awarded since 1881 for excellence in the General Examination for the degree of BD by a committee of subscribers whose convener was Robert Jamieson (DD 1848), minister of St Paul's in Glasgow.

=== Pentecostal Bible College (1913-1914) ===
On May 11, 1912, Sharpe proposed in the Sixth Annual Assembly of the Pentecostal Church of Scotland that Winchester be ordained, and the all-male General Assembly agreed unanimously. On May 11, 1912, Winchester was ordained in a special service led by Rev. George J. Kunz at 4.00pm Parkhead, Glasgow, Scotland by the Pentecostal Church of Scotland, thus becoming the first woman ever ordained by any Christian denomination in Scotland.

Additionally, the delegates voted to establish a ministerial training college. A terrace house located at 1 Westbourne Terrace, Kelvinside, near the University of Glasgow, was purchased to house the relocated college. Classes began there in late September 1913, with Winchester as one of the teachers of the seven students. Winchester resided in this home with George and Jane Sharpe and their family, and three of the students.

On August 10, 1913, Winchester and her mother, Sarah, arrived in New York on the RMS Mauretania from Liverpool, England. On September 24, 1913, Winchester arrived in Liverpool on the SS Laconia, just before the first academic session of the Pentecostal Bible College.

In 1913 Winchester urged the creation of the missionary society of the Pentecostal Church of Scotland, and was elected its first president. As the Pentecostal Church of Scotland did not have its own missionaries, Winchester urged the support of missionaries of her previous denomination, the Pentecostal Church of the Nazarene.

For several years Winchester wrote to the leaders of the Pentecostal Church of the Nazarene in Kansas City, Missouri, urging them to send representatives to Scotland to expedite a merger of the two denominations. "Winchester's involvement in the Pentecostal Church of Scotland helped it clarify its doctrine of the ministry, and in 1915, she played a role in facilitating the merger of that denomination and the Pentecostal Church of the Nazarene."

=== Pentecostal Collegiate Institute (1914-1916) ===
On April 11, 1914, Winchester departed Liverpool, England, on the RMS Lusitania, arriving in New York on April 14, 1914. In June 1914, Winchester returned to the Pentecostal Collegiate Institute in North Scituate, Rhode Island. She was appointed vice-principal and head of the Theology department. After two years, Winchester resigned to move to Berkeley, California, to continue her post-graduate studies.

=== Pacific School of Religion (1916-1917) ===
Winchester's education continued at Berkeley, California, where she received the S.T.M. (Master of Sacred Theology) degree magna cum laude from the Pacific School of Religion on May 3, 1917. Her thesis was "Messianic Quotations of the Psalms in the New Testament".

While studying in Berkeley, she became friends with H. Orton Wiley, pastor of the Berkeley Church of the Nazarene and fellow student at the Pacific School of Religion.

=== Northwest Nazarene College (1918-1935) ===
In 1918 Winchester became the professor of biblical literature and theology professor at Northwest Nazarene College in Nampa, Idaho, at the invitation of its president Dr H. Orton Wiley. During her tenure at NNC, Winchester "contributed significantly to the success of the young college's academic development". Winchester also served as the founding pastor of the Marsing, Idaho Church of the Nazarene from 24 March 1918 until 19 May 1918, until a permanent pastor was appointed.

When her great-uncle's sole heir, Sarah Lockwood Winchester, the widow of his son William Wirt Winchester, died in September 1922, part of the multi-million dollar estate was left to Olive Winchester. Additionally, Winchester was the beneficiary of 25% of a substantial estate of her maternal great-uncle, Levi Merrick Stewart (December 10, 1827, in Corinna, Maine – May 3, 1910, in Minneapolis, Minnesota). Following these inheritances, in 1922 Winchester provided the funds to build a home for Wiley at Northwest Nazarene College. According to Ingersol,

Throughout her tenure at Northwest Nazarene, Winchester taught her specialties: Biblical language and literature. But she also grew interested in the whole idea of religious education in the local church, and at Northwest Nazarene she developed and taught the initial courses in religious education. She spurred further interest in that emerging discipline by contributing frequent articles on religious education to church papers and curriculum resource manuals.

Later she added sociology and Christian education to her teaching load. President Wiley, who appreciated good talent and Olive Winchester, made her vice president of the College in 1922, and the following year she was appointed academic dean as well, holding both positions simultaneously until her resignation in 1935. ... A history of Northwest's first quarter-century summarized her administrative role in a sentence: "She contributed very much to the development of the right attitude toward scholastic standards, as vice-president and dean of the college had much to do with the internal organization of the institution."... At the center of her legacy stood the undeniable fact that she was a pivotal figure in the transition of Northwest Nazarene College from a sagebrush academy to a sound academic institution.

In 1925 Winchester was the first woman to complete a Th.D. (Doctor of Theology) degree from the divinity school of Drew University in Madison, New Jersey. for her dissertation entitled: "The Psychological Terms of the New Testament: Their Source and Content." Winchester "excelled in Latin, Greek, and Hebrew, and had a reading knowledge of French and German. Religious education and sociology were two additional fields of study that Olive specialized in, and both were largely learned through personal study and rigorous self-discipline."

In 1927 Winchester said: "We feel that a good wholesome religious life administers to educational standards."

In June 1932 Olive Winchester attended the Eighth General Assembly of the Church of the Nazarene in Wichita, Kansas, as a delegate from the Idaho-Oregon District. Winchester resigned from Northwest Nazarene College in 1935 due to differences with Wiley's successor, President Russell V. DeLong.

=== Pasadena College (1935-1947) ===
Wiley invited her to teach at Pasadena College (now Point Loma Nazarene University) where she taught until her death in 1947. She was appointed head of the graduate department by Wiley.

While at Pasadena College, Winchester served as one of the advisors for the Revised Standard Version of New Testament, that was published on February 11, 1946.

Winchester died on February 15, 1947, at the age of 67. In her will, Winchester left $50,000 to Pasadena College to build the Howard Library. After her mother Sarah's death on February 21, 1949, her estate left funds to establish and maintain a theological library in memory of her daughter at Pasadena College,

== Evaluation ==
According to Nazarene historian Stan Ingersol, "Winchester was not the only woman to teach religion at Nazarene colleges during her lifetime. ... But Winchester far surpassed them in academic background and achievement, paving the way for other professional female theologians in the church, including Mildred Bangs Wynkoop, who encountered Winchester as a freshman at Northwest Nazarene College."

== Beliefs ==
Winchester was "committed to the "hermeneutic of holiness"", and has been described as "the descriptive-doctrinaire approach" to teaching biblical theology. According to Ingersol, "Winchester had earned high marks in biblical criticism at Glasgow but was conservative in her application of this knowledge within the Nazarene context. Her books included studies of Moses, the prophets, and the life of Jesus. Her Crisis Experiences in the Greek New Testament (1953) stood in the linguistic-exegetical tradition pioneered by Daniel Steele, a Methodist scholar at Boston University.

Steele defended the doctrine of entire sanctification by a study of the Greek aorist, and Winchester appropriated his agenda and attempted to develop it further, though this approach has since fallen out of favor with many Wesleyan-holiness biblical scholars.

However, Nazarene theologian and general superintendent John A. Knight argued in 1995 that Winchester and Steele were part of an "earlier generation of holiness-traditions scholars [who] overstated the grammatical evidence for entire sanctification as a 'second definite work of grace.'

Winchester rejected the increasingly prevalent premillennial perspective. Reflecting the New England tradition of Wesleyan-holiness biblical scholarship shaped by Daniel Steele, she was amillennial and interpreted the Book of Revelation as a coded record of events that had occurred in the New Testament era, perhaps during Nero's reign, not predictions of the future.

In 1931, Winchester wrote a series on science and religion in The Young People's Journal, a Nazarene publication for high school youth, where she had a regular column.

In the second essay in the series, Winchester described three scientific theories on the origins of the universe, identifying her own view as the "planetesimal theory," which held that the observable universe developed as gravitational forces caused matter to coalesce over long eons of time. Nazarene theologian A. M. Hills embraced the identical view when he discussed the Christian doctrine of creation in his 2-vol Fundamental Christian Theology. While neither believed in biological evolution, Winchester and Hills embraced cosmic and geological evolution without compunction.

Winchester was quoted as saying: "When in a mental fog, attend to definitions."

== Honours and awards ==
Each year Northwest Nazarene University presents the Olive M. Winchester Religious Essay Award. The Olive Winchester Memorial Church of the Nazarene in the upper terraces of La Paz, Bolivia has ministered to the Aymara since 1960 is named in her honor.

On May 8, 2012, John Mason MSP Scottish National Party for Glasgow Shettleston moved that the following be entered into the record of the Parliament of Scotland: "Parliament notes that 11 May 2012 is the 100th anniversary of the first woman being ordained to the UK Trinitarian Christian Ministry; considers that Olive Winchester, who was ordained to, and served in, what is now the Sharpe Memorial Church of the Nazarene, Parkhead, Glasgow, set a precedent for strong women of faith to serve in Christian ministry; notes the Women in Ministry events being held in Glasgow between 11 and 13 May 2012, including those at the University of Glasgow; believes that every woman, child and man is of equal value, and wishes the organisers and people taking part well as they celebrate what it believes is this significant milestone for the UK's Christian community."

From May 11–13, 2012 a weekend conference, "Women, the Church and Ministry: Celebrating 100 years of women's ordination in the UK", was held at the University Chapel of the University of Glasgow to mark the occasion of the 100th anniversary of the ordination of Winchester. It was organised and sponsored by the University of Glasgow's School of Critical Studies, the International Christian College, the Nazarene Theological College, the Manchester Wesley Research Centre, and Sharpe Memorial Church of the Nazarene, Glasgow. Among the papers presented were "Olive M. Winchester: A Gentlewoman and a Scholar" by Rebecca Laird of Point Loma Nazarene University, "Revd Dr Olive Winchester: Holiness Greek Scholar" by C. Jeanne Orjala Serrão of Mount Vernon Nazarene University, and "Sisters in the Spirit: Women Preaching from John Wesley to Olive Winchester" by Harold Raser of Nazarene Theological Seminary.

A commemorative service was held on the evening of May 11, 2012, in Sharpe Memorial Church of the Nazarene at Parkhead, where Winchester was ordained. The Parkhead building was scheduled for demolition to make way for a new building, but demolition was held off for the service. Those present included retired Nazarene missionary to Swaziland Dr. Samuel Hynd, son of Agnes Kanema Hynd, the third woman ordained to be ordained in Scotland, who is also the grandson of George Sharpe, who ordained Winchester, and his wife Jane, who was the second woman to be ordained in Scotland. The first woman to be a minister in charge of a Scottish church was Vera Kenmure.

== Works ==
=== Articles ===
- "Angel Sentinels". In Bondservants of the Japanese by Robert B. Hammond. Sheffield Press, 1943; 8th ed. Voice of China & Asia, 1957. Poem Dedicated to Robert and Helen Hammond (founders of the Voice of China & Asia (VOCA) mission) by Olive M. Winchester.
- "The German Attitude to the Bible". Bibliotheca Sacra 78 (1921).
- "Our Inheritance In Heaven". The Preacher's Magazine 4:10 (October 1929).
- "Precepts For Christian Living". The Preacher's Magazine 4:10 (October 1929).
- "Qualifications of an Interpreter". Nazarene Messenger (November 1921):5, 11.
- "Sin in the Light of To-Day," Bibliotheca Sacra 76 No. 302 (April 1919): 152-164.
- "Steps In A Soul's Departure From God". The Preacher's Magazine 4:10 (October 1929).
- "Studies In The Sermon On The Mount". The Preacher's Magazine 4:10 (October 1929).
- "Women in the Teaching Ministry." Herald of Holiness (2 July 1945):5.

=== Books ===
- A Brief Survey Of The Old Testament: Moses and the Prophets. Kansas City, MO: Nazarene Publishing House, 1941.
- Christ's Life and Ministry. Kansas City, MO: Nazarene Publishing House, 1932.
- Crisis Experiences in the Greek New Testament: An Investigation of the Evidence for the Definite, Miraculous of Regeneration and Sanctification as Found in the Greek New Testament, Especially in the Figures Emphasized, and in the Use of the Aorist Tense. Edited Throughout, With Final Chapter By Ross E. Price. Kansas City, MO: Beacon Hill Press, 1953. Includes good bio summary of Winchester's Life by Price.
- Principles of the Interior or Hidden Life: Designed Particularly For The Consideration Of Those Who Are Seeking Assurance Of Faith And Perfect Love, by Thomas Cogswell Upham. Abridged By Olive M. Winchester. Kansas City, MO: Beacon Hill Press, 1946.
- The Story of the Old Testament. (Revised edition of Moses and the Prophets), by Olive M. Winchester and W.T. Purkiser. Kansas City, MO: Beacon Hill, 1960.
