= William Henry Houghton =

American evangelist

- Born: June 28, 1887; South Boston, Massachusetts, United States
- Died: June 14, 1947 (aged 59)
- Education: Pentecostal Collegiate Institute
- Occupation: evangelist
- Notable work: president, Moody Bible Institute
- Spouses: Adelaide Franks (m. 1914; died 1916) Elizabeth Andrews (m. 1918)
- Children: 2 (Franks), 1 (Andrews)

William Henry "Will" Houghton (June 28, 1887 – June 14, 1947) was an evangelist and the fourth president of Moody Bible Institute, in Chicago. Biographer Wilbur Smith said of him: "Two primary passions possessed the soul of Will H. Houghton: From the beginning of his ministry to the end… evangelism, and the study of the word of God." Houghton was known for his fundamentalist Christianity.

== Biographical details ==
William was born in South Boston, Massachusetts, to John William Houghton and Carrie Maude Grant of Nova Scotia, Canada. William Houghton was converted to Christianity at age 14, during an evangelistic meeting in Lynn, Massachusetts. In June 1914, Houghton married Adelaide Franks and they had two children, Adelaide Maude and Everett Arthur. Adelaide Franks Houghton died two years later, and William Houghton remarried in December 1918 to Elizabeth Andrews. On December 8, 1919, they had a son, Firman Andrews. William Houghton, himself, died of a heart attack in 1947, while still president of MBI.

== Education ==
Initially interested in theatre and active in the Vaudeville Circuit, Houghton became convinced in 1909 to give up drama and, instead, enrolled at the Pentecostal Collegiate Institute, in North Scituate, Rhode Island, but soon left without finishing. He was later awarded an honorary Doctor of Divinity degree, in 1931, by Wheaton College and an honorary Doctor of Law degree by Bob Jones University, in 1942.

== Ministry ==
Houghton took his first pastorate at the First Baptist Church of Canton, Pennsylvania, in 1915. After two years, Houghton left to pursue evangelistic work throughout New York and Pennsylvania. After a series of revivalistic meetings at a Baptist church in New Bethlehem, Pennsylvania, in the spring of 1918, he accepted their offer of the pastorate and stayed until he took a new pastorate at the First Baptist Church of Norristown, Pennsylvania, in the fall of 1920. Houghton then pastored at the First Baptist Tabernacle of Atlanta, from 1925 to 1928, and the Calvary Baptist Church in New York City, the headquarters of the New York Youth Christian Center, from 1930 to 1934. In 1932, he founded the New York Summer School of Theology.

== MBI presidency ==
In 1934, James M. Gray, then-president of Moody Bible Institute, visited Calvary Baptist and, impressed with Houghton, offered the evangelist the presidency of the institute. The MBI Board of Trustees extended an official offer on August 16, 1934, and Houghton succeeded Gray on November 1, 1934. Houghton was president at MBI for 12 years. During his first 11 years, enrollment increased 70 percent. He also directed the "D.L. Moody Centenary Celebration" that was held on February 5, 1937, and oversaw construction of a 12-story administrative building at 820 North LaSalle Boulevard, which was dedicated on February 4, 1939 (renamed Crowell Hall in 1945). In addition to having WMBI radio begin broadcasting regularly, Houghton established fundamentalist chain radio broadcasts and the Moody Institute of Science. In 1950, the Institute named a nine-story women's dormitory Houghton Hall after William Henry Houghton.

== Published works ==
- Houghton, William H. Back to the Bible: Let's Go Back to the Bible. New York: Fleming H. Revell Co., c1940.
- ____. The Living Christ and Other Gospel Messages. Chicago: The Bible Institute Colportage Association, c1936.
- ____. Problems of Youth: How Shall I Live, Think, Love? New York: Calvary Baptist Church, N.d.
- ____. Rhymes from a City Tower. Chicago: The Bible Institute Colportage Association, c1940.
- ____. Star and Sceptre. Chicago: Bible Institute Colportage Association, c1935.
- Houghton, William H. and Chas. T. Cook. Tell Me about Moody. Chicago: The Bible Institute Colportage Association, c1937.

== Sources ==
- Leuschner, Martin. "Meet the President." Baptist Standard (1 July 1935): 195 - 7.
- Smith, Wilbur. "The Man Who Built on the Bible." Moody Monthly 48 (June 1948): 715 - 6, 730, 768 - 9.
- ____. Will H. Houghton: A Watchman on the Wall. Grand Rapids: Eerdmans, 1951.
- Stewart, Ralph. "Will H. Houghton: An Appreciation, Voicing the Feelings of the Members of the Baptist Tabernacle." Tabernacle Tidings (16 December 1928): 1 - 2.
- Wertheim, E. L. "Dr. Houghton to Become President of Moody." Western Recorder 108, no. 38 (20 September 1934): 4.
- Whitesell, Faris D. "Will H. Houghton, the Polished Personal Worker." The Sunday School Times (7 August 1954): 643 - 4.
