= Samuel Lewis =

Samuel Lewis or Sam Lewis may refer to:

== Politics ==
- Samuel Lewis (educator) (1799–1854), American politician, Ohio Superintendent of Common Schools and Liberty Party candidate
- Samuel A. Lewis (1831–1913), American politician and philanthropist
- Samuel Lewis (barrister) (1843–1903), Sierra Leonean politician, lawyer, first African to be knighted
- Samuel S. Lewis (1874–1959), Secretary of the Pennsylvania Department of Forest and Waters in 1951–1954
- Sam Lewis (trade unionist) (1901–1976), Australian trade unionist
- Samuel W. Lewis (1930–2014), American diplomat
- Samuel W. Lewis (politician), American politician
- Samuel Lewis Navarro (born 1957), vice president of Panama

== Other ==
- Samuel Lewis, early South Australian stonemason who carved the cross on William Light's first memorial
- Samuel Lewis (publisher) (c. 1782–1865), editor and publisher of topographical dictionaries and maps
- Samuel Lewis (financier) (1837–1901), English money-lender and philanthropist
- Samuel E. Lewis (1840–1907), Union Army soldier, Medal of Honor recipient
- Sam M. Lewis (1885–1959), American singer and lyricist
- Samuel L. Lewis (1896–1971), American Sufi founder, Zen educator
- Sam Lewis (rugby union, born 1990), Welsh rugby union player
- Sam Lewis (rugby union, born 1998), English rugby union player
- Sam Lewis (game designer), American designer of board games
