= Old Congregational Church =

Old Congregational Church can refer to:

- Old Congregational Church (Sycamore, Illinois)
- Old Congregational Church (Rhode Island)
