= Watchman Institute =

Watchman Industrial School

Location
- North Scituate, Rhode Island; United States
- 41.834158°N 71.583052°W

Information
- Type: Private Trade school
- Established: 1908
- Closed: 1938
- Campus: Rural/Suburban

The Watchman Industrial School and Camp, also known as the Watchman Institute, was founded in 1908 for black youths by Reverend William S. Holland in Providence, Rhode Island. He based it on the educational theories of Booker T. Washington. In 1923, Holland moved the school to North Scituate when he acquired the property of the Pentecostal Collegiate Institute. He closed the school in 1938 during the Great Depression, when many private schools were unable to survive financially.

The school had suffered fires in 1924 and 1926; newspapers reported that the Ku Klux Klan was suspected, as it had become active in the western part of the state. Holland and his wife operated the related summer camp at the facility from 1938 until 1974.

== History ==
The school was founded by Reverend William S. Holland, who was educated at Virginia Union University. Deeply interested in education for black youth, Holland founded the Watchman Industrial School at 140 Codding Street, in Providence in 1908. He hoped to duplicate the success of the educational program of Booker T. Washington, as operating at the Hampton Institute and the Tuskegee Institute, historically black colleges. He trained black youths in vocational trades in addition to academic subjects, hence the name "industrial school," which was a popular model at the time for lower-class youths. Educators believed that young people needed to be taught skills for the workplace. Holland often took custody of young persons in trouble with the authorities, in lieu of seeing them enter Rhode Island's reform school or prison systems.

The Watchman Industrial School was incorporated in Rhode Island by 1910. In 1917, the Watchman School was described in the report of the Phelps-Stokes Fund as "a small elementary school of very doubtful management. The industrial work is negligible." The Fund was managing a study of black education and surveyed private as well as public schools.

== North Scituate ==
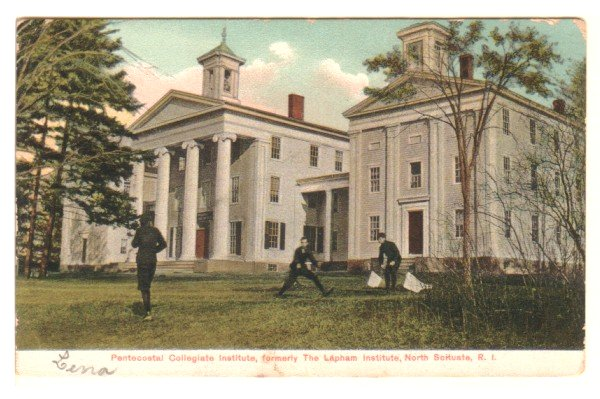
The Pentecostal Collegiate Institute in North Scituate, 1905.

In 1920, Holland acquired the North Scituate campus of the former Pentecostal Collegiate Institute, which had moved to Wollaston in Quincy, Massachusetts, the year before. He moved the Watchman Institute there in 1923.

The buildings were originally designed in 1839 for the Smithville Seminary by Russell Warren, the leading Greek Revival architect in New England in the 19th century. Holland advertised his school as "the ideal Home for Boys and Girls age 14 years and upwards" in the December 1923 edition of The Crisis, the magazine of the National Association for the Advancement of Colored People (NAACP).

The school had two suspicious fires in 1924 and 1926, and a former student reported seeing a cross being burned on the school lawn in the 1930s. Newspapers reported in the 1920s incidents that the local Ku Klux Klan chapter was suspected, as the KKK had become active in western Rhode Island after World War I, chiefly out of anti-immigration sentiment. No one was ever arrested or charged in the incidents.

After closing the school, Holland continued to operate the summer camp until his death in 1958. After his death, his second wife and widow Viola Grant Holland (1901–1986) took over operation of the camp. She ran it until 1974, when it was forced to close for financial reasons. By 1969, the principal of the camp was Edward T. Duncan.

In 1978 the complex was included as a contributing property to the Smithville – North Scituate historic district, listed on the National Register of Historic Places. The buildings were renovated in the 1970s and converted into apartments known as Scituate Commons. In 1985 the site was designated by Rhode Island as an African-American historic site.

== William S. Holland ==
=== Early life and education ===
William S. Holland was born in October 1866 in Virginia to former slaves. He likely attended local black schools. He graduated from Virginia Union University of Richmond, Virginia, in 1897.

=== Marriage and family ===
After college, in 1899 Holland married Evalina (also known as Evelyn) Brown. She was born September 1875 in Virginia. They had one son, William F.B. Holland (born March 1900 in Rhode Island).

After Evalina's death, Holland married Viola E. Holland (born 1901 in Worcester, Massachusetts; died 14 October 1986 in Rhode Island). She survived him and operated the summer camp for years.
