= Charles D. Ennis =

American soldier in the American Civil War

- Born: August 8, 1843; Stonington, Connecticut, US
- Died: December 29, 1930 (aged 87); Rhode Island, US
- Burial place: White Brook Cemetery
- Military career
- Allegiance: United States
- Branch: United States Army
- Rank: Private
- Unit: Battery G, 1st Rhode Island Volunteer Light Artillery
- Awards: Medal of Honor

Private Charles D. Ennis (8 August 1843 – 29 December 1930) was an American soldier who fought in the American Civil War. Ennis received the United States' highest award for bravery during combat, the Medal of Honor, for his action during the Third Battle of Petersburg in Virginia on April 2, 1865. He was honored with the award on June 28, 1892.

== Biography ==
Ennis was born in Stonington, Connecticut, on August 8, 1843. He enlisted into the 1st Rhode Island Light Artillery. He died on December 29, 1930, and his remains are interred at the White Brook Cemetery in Rhode Island.

== Medal of Honor citation ==
The President of the United States of America, in the name of Congress, takes pleasure in presenting the Medal of Honor to Private Charles D. Ennis, United States Army, for extraordinary heroism on 2 April 1865, while serving with Company G, 1st Rhode Island Light Artillery, in action at Petersburg, Virginia. Private Ennis was one of a detachment of 20 picked artillerymen who voluntarily accompanied an infantry assaulting party and who turned upon the enemy the guns captured in the assault.

== See also ==
- List of American Civil War Medal of Honor recipients: A–F
