= Andrews–Luther Farm =

- U.S. National Register of Historic Places
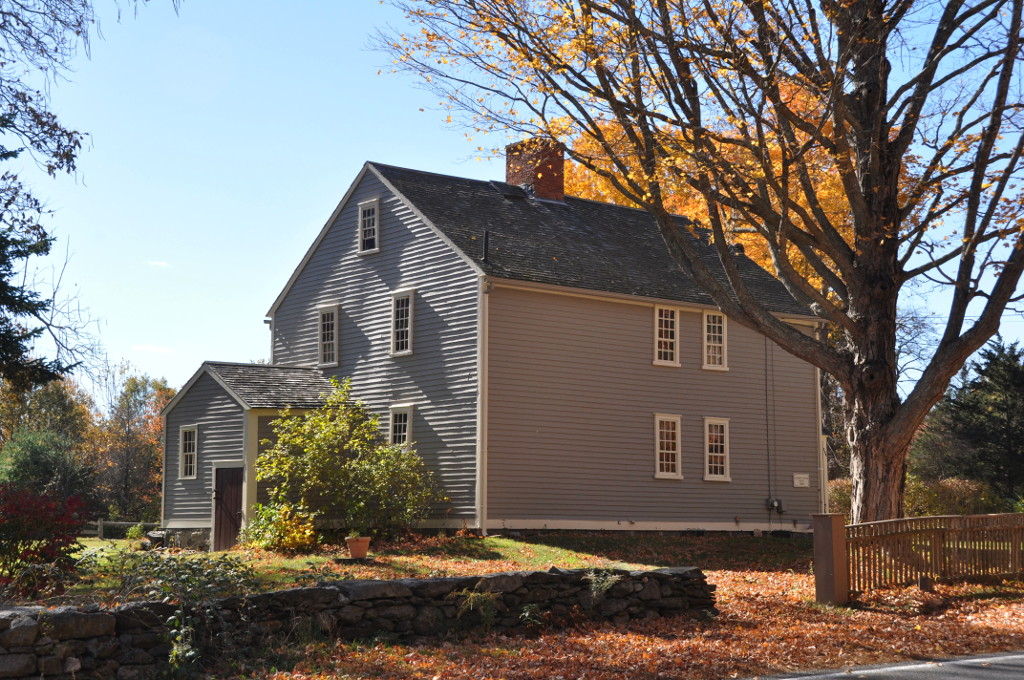

- Location within Rhode Island Location within the United States
- Location: Scituate, Rhode Island
- Coordinates: 41.85471°N 71.59984°W
- Area: 45 acres (18 ha)
- Built: 1768
- Architectural style: Greek Revival
- NRHP reference No.: 85001352
- Added to NRHP: June 19, 1985

The Andrews–Luther Farm (also known as the Harley Luther Farm) is a historic farm in Scituate, Rhode Island. It is located on the south side of Elmdale Road, a short way east of its junction with Harmony Road. The farm is a 45-acre (18 ha) property, with its main house, a c. 1768 wood-frame structure set near the road. It is 2 1/2 stories high, with a large central chimney, and a center entry on the south facade (i.e. facing away from the road) with vernacular Greek Revival styling. A corn crib dating to the late 19th or early 20th century stands further south on the property, and the foundational remains of older buildings dot the area. The farm is distinctive for retaining a large portion of its original setting, and for the detailed accounts of it which have been retained by Harley Luther's descendants.

The property was listed on the National Register of Historic Places in 1985.

== See also ==
- National Register of Historic Places listings in Providence County, Rhode Island
