= Double L Site, RI-958 =

- U.S. National Register of Historic Places
- Location: Scituate, Rhode Island
- NRHP reference No.: 85002362
- Added to NRHP: September 12, 1985

Double L Site, RI-958 is a historic site located in Scituate, Rhode Island, United States.

The site was added to the US National Historic Register on September 12, 1985 and contains prehistoric archaeological evidence.
