= Moswansicut Pond Site, RI-960 =

- U.S. National Register of Historic Places
- Location: Scituate, Rhode Island
- NRHP reference No.: 85002363
- Added to NRHP: September 12, 1985

Moswansicut Pond Site, RI-960 is an historic site in Scituate, Rhode Island

The site offers prehistoric archaeological evidence and was added to the National Historic Register on September 12, 1985.
