= Battery G, 1st Rhode Island Light Artillery Regiment =

- Active: December 1861 to June 24, 1865
- Country: United States
- Allegiance: Union
- Branch: Artillery
- Equipment: 6 3 inch caliber ordnance rifles
- Engagements: Siege of Yorktown; Battle of Fair Oaks; Seven Days Battles; Battle of Savage's Station; Battle of Glendale; Battle of Malvern Hill; Battle of Antietam; Battle of Fredericksburg; Battle of Chancellorsville; Second Battle of Fredericksburg; Battle of Gettysburg; Bristoe Campaign; Mine Run Campaign; Battle of the Wilderness; Battle of Spotsylvania Court House; Battle of Totopotomoy Creek; Battle of Cold Harbor; Siege of Petersburg; Battle of Jerusalem Plank Road; Battle of Fort Stevens; Battle of Opequon; Battle of Fisher's Hill; Battle of Cedar Creek; Appomattox Campaign; Third Battle of Petersburg; Battle of Sayler's Creek; Battle of High Bridge; Battle of Appomattox Court House

Battery G, 1st Rhode Island Light Artillery Regiment was an artillery battery that served in the Union Army during the American Civil War.

== Service ==
Battery G, 1st Rhode Island Light Artillery Regiment was organized in Providence, Rhode Island and mustered in for a three-year enlistment in December 1861 under the command of Captain Charles D. Owen.

The battery was attached to Sedgwick's Division, Army of the Potomac, to March 1862. Reserve Artillery, II Corps, Army of the Potomac, to October 1862. Artillery, 3rd Division, II Corps, Army of the Potomac, to May 1863. 4th Volunteer Brigade, Artillery Reserve, Army of the Potomac, to July 1863. Artillery Brigade, VI Corps, Army of the Potomac, to August 1864, and Army of the Shenandoah, Middle Military Division, to November 1864. Camp Barry, XXII Corps, Department of Washington, to December 1864. Artillery Brigade, VI Corps, Army of the Potomac, to June 1865.

Battery G, 1st Rhode Island Light Artillery mustered out of service on June 24, 1865.

== Detailed service ==
Left Rhode Island for Washington, D.C., December 7. Duty at Camp Sprague, defenses of Washington, D.C., until January 3, 1862. Moved to Darnestown January 3 and to Poolesville, Md. Duty there until February and at Edward's Ferry until March. At Bolivar Heights until March 26. Moved to Washington, D.C., then to the Virginia Peninsula March 26-April 2. Siege of Yorktown April 5-May 4. Battle of Fair Oaks, Seven Pines, May 31-June 1. Seven days before Richmond June 25-July 1. Peach Orchard and Savage Station June 29. Charles City Cross Roads and Glendale June 30. Malvern Hill July 1. At Harrison's Landing until August 16. Movement to Alexandria August 16–28, then march to Fairfax Court House August 28–31. Cover retreat of Pope's army from Bull Run to Washington, D.C., August 31-September 2. Battle of Antietam, September 16–17. Moved to Harpers Ferry, W. Va., September 22, and duty there until October 22. Advance up Loudoun Valley and movement to Falmouth, Va., October 30-November 18. Battle of Fredericksburg December 12–15. "Mud March" January 20–24, 1863. At Falmouth until April. Chancellorsville Campaign April 27-May 6. Maryes Heights, Fredericksburg, May 3. Salem Heights May 3–4. Banks' Ford May 4. Franklin's Crossing June 5–13. Battle of Gettysburg, July 2–4. Near Fairfield July 5. Funkstown, Md., July 10–13. Bristoe Campaign October 9–22. Advance to line of the Rappahannock November 7–8. Rappahannock Station November 7. Mine Run Campaign November 26-December 2. At Brandy Station until May 1864. Rapidan Campaign May–June. Battles of the Wilderness May 5–7; Spotsylvania May 8–12; Spotsylvania Court House May 12–21. Assault on the Salient May 12. North Anna River May 23–26. On line of the Pamunkey May 26–28. Totopotomoy May 28–31. Cold Harbor June 1–12. Before Petersburg June 17–18. Siege of Petersburg June 16-July 9. Jerusalem Plank Road June 22–23. Moved to Washington, D.C., July 9–12. Repulse of Early's attack on Washington July 12. Snicker's Ferry July 17–18. Sheridan's Shenandoah Valley Campaign August to November. Battle of Opequon, Winchester, September 19. Fisher's Hill September 22. Mount Jackson September 23–24. Battle of Cedar Creek October 19. Duty at Winchester and Kernstown until November. Moved to Washington, D.C., and refit, then moved to Petersburg, Va. Siege of Petersburg December 1864 to April 1865. Fort Fisher, Petersburg, March 25, 1865. Appomattox Campaign March 28-April 9. Assault on and fall of Petersburg April 2. Pursuit of Lee April 3–9. Sayler's Creek April 6. High Bridge and Farmville April 7. Appomattox Court House April 9. Surrender of Lee and his army.

== Casualties ==
The battery lost a total of 30 men during service; 2 officers and 10 enlisted men killed or mortally wounded, 18 enlisted men died of disease.

== Commanders ==
- Captain Charles D. Owen
- Captain George W. Adams

== Notable members ==
- Corporal James A. Barber – Medal of Honor recipient for action at the Third Battle of Petersburg, April 2, 1865
- Private John Corcoran - Medal of Honor recipient for action at the third battle of Petersburg, April 2, 1865
- Private Charles D. Ennis - Medal of Honor recipient for action at the third battle of Petersburg, April 2, 1865
- Sergeant John H. Havron - Medal of Honor recipient for action at the third battle of Petersburg, April 2, 1865
- Corporal Samuel E. Lewis - Medal of Honor recipient for action at the third battle of Petersburg, April 2, 1865
- Sergeant Archibald Molbone - Medal of Honor recipient for action at the third battle of Petersburg, April 2, 1865
- Private George W. Potter - Medal of Honor recipient for action at the third battle of Petersburg, April 2, 1865

== See also ==
- List of Rhode Island Civil War units
- Rhode Island in the American Civil War
