= Battey–Barden House =

Historic house in Rhode Island, United States

- U.S. National Register of Historic Places
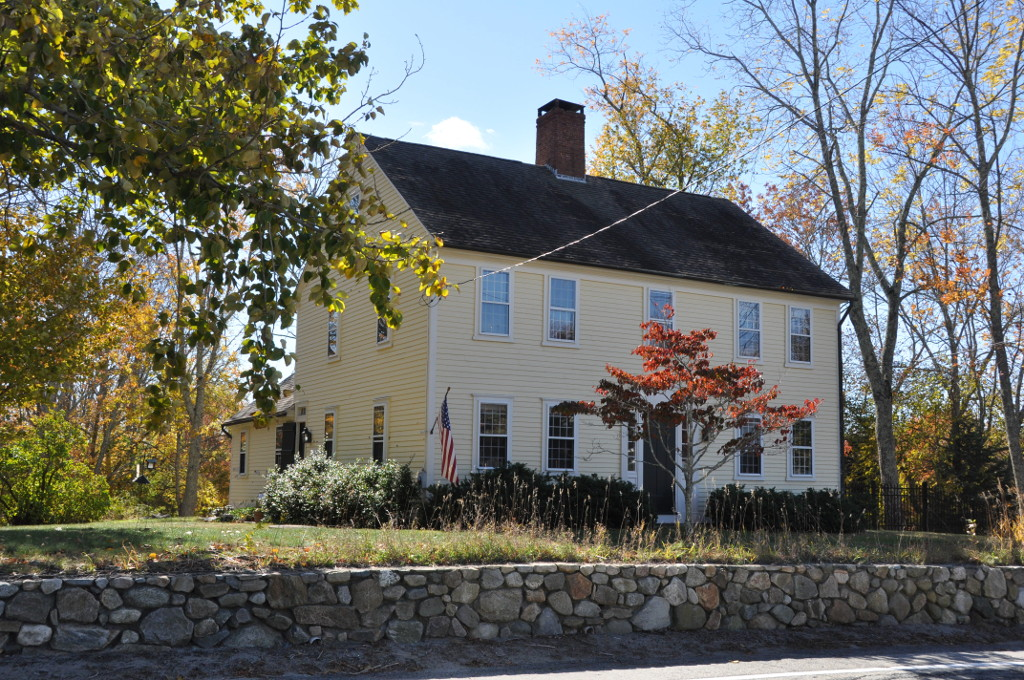

- Location within Rhode Island Location within the United States
- Location: 710 Plainfield Pike, Scituate, Rhode Island
- Coordinates: 41°47′30″N 71°37′8″W
- Area: 5.1 acres (2.1 ha)
- Architectural style: Federal
- NRHP reference No.: 80000084
- Added to NRHP: August 29, 1980

The Battey–Barden House is an historic house in Scituate, Rhode Island, US. It is a 2 1/2-story wood-frame structure with a large central chimney. A 1 1/2-story kitchen ell extends from the rear of the main block. The main block's construction date is uncertain, with architectural evidence suggesting it was built between about 1816 and 1831. It was probably built around 1824 for Horace Battey, a farmer and shopkeeper. The house is particularly notable for the stencilwork on its interior walls.

The house was listed on the National Register of Historic Places on August 29, 1980.

== See also ==
- National Register of Historic Places listings in Providence County, Rhode Island
