= Seagrave Memorial Observatory =

Observatory in Rhode Island, US

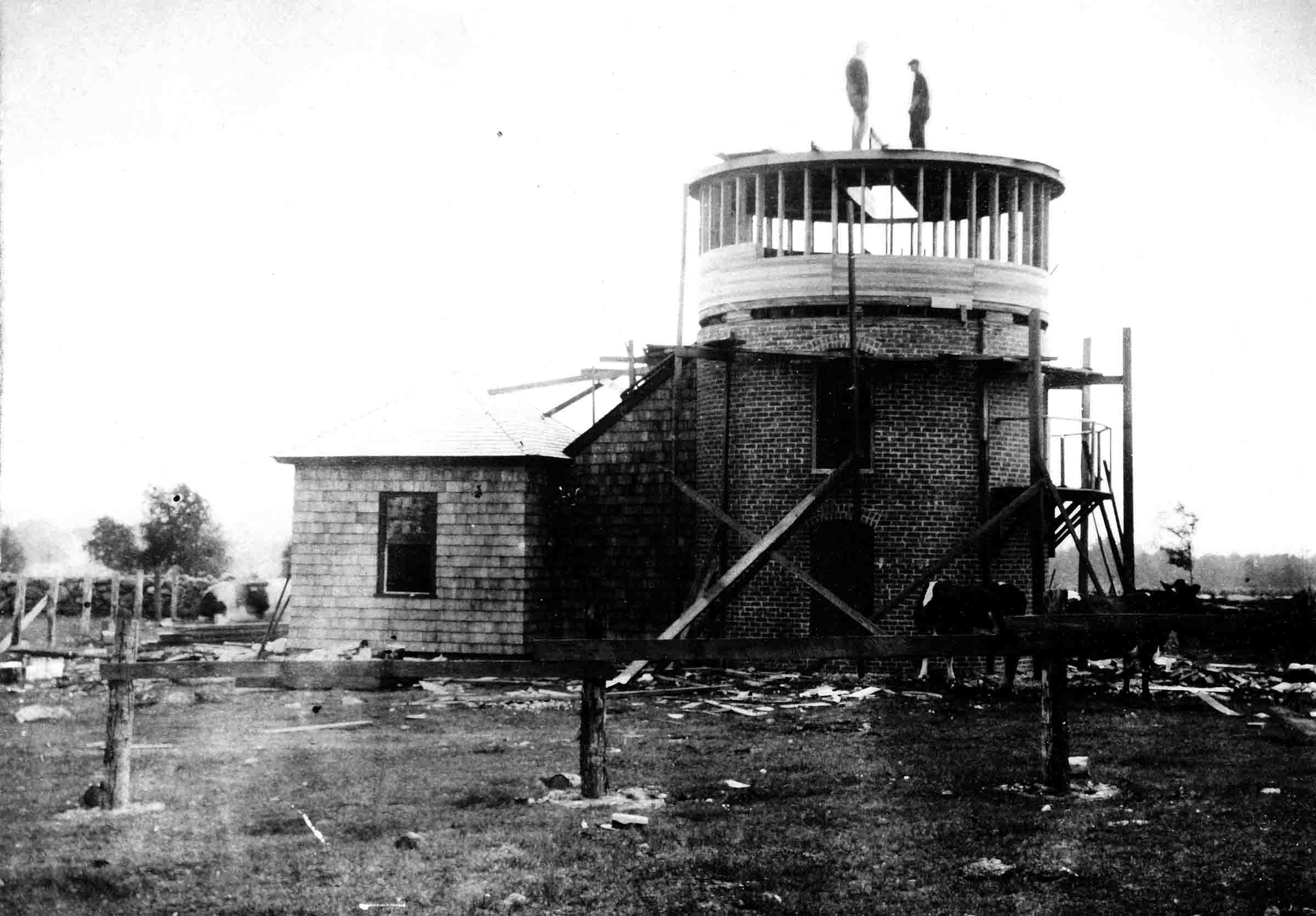
- The Observatory during construction in 1914
- Organization: Skyscrapers, Inc.
- Location: North Scituate, Rhode Island
- Coordinates: 41°50′43″N 71°35′28″W
- Established: 1914
- Website: Seagrave Memorial Observatory

Telescopes
- Alvan Clark: 8¼-inch refractor
- Patton: 12-inch reflector
- Meade: 12-inch Schmidt-Cassegrain
- Meade: 16-inch Schmidt-Cassegrain

Seagrave Memorial Observatory is an astronomical observatory located in North Scituate, Rhode Island. It is named after astronomer Frank Evens Seagrave and is wholly owned and operated by Skyscrapers, Inc. The main instrument is an 8¼-inch Alvan Clark refracting telescope which was given to Frank Evens Seagrave for his 16th birthday in 1876, however the telescope took two years to build, so he did not receive it until 1878. The telescope and Seagrave Observatory (as the private observatory was then known) were originally at 119 Benefit Street in Providence. At the time it was the third largest telescope in New England. The telescope was moved to North Scituate in October 1914 when the construction of the current observatory was completed. The observatory was acquired by the Skycrapers in 1936 after the death of Seagrave.

== See also ==
- List of astronomical observatories
