= Millrace Site, RI-1039 =

- U.S. National Register of Historic Places
- Nearest city: Scituate, Rhode Island
- NRHP reference No.: 85002361
- Added to NRHP: 12 September 1985

The Millrace Site, RI-1039 is an archaeological site near Scituate, Rhode Island.

The site was added to the National Register of Historic Places on September 12, 1985. Publication of the location by the United States government is restricted under the Archaeological Resources Protection Act of 1979.

== See also ==
- List of burial mounds in the United States
- Historic preservation
- History of Rhode Island
- Mound builders
- Native Americans in the United States
- Protected area
