= Amos Cooke House =

Historic house in Rhode Island, United States

- U.S. National Register of Historic Places
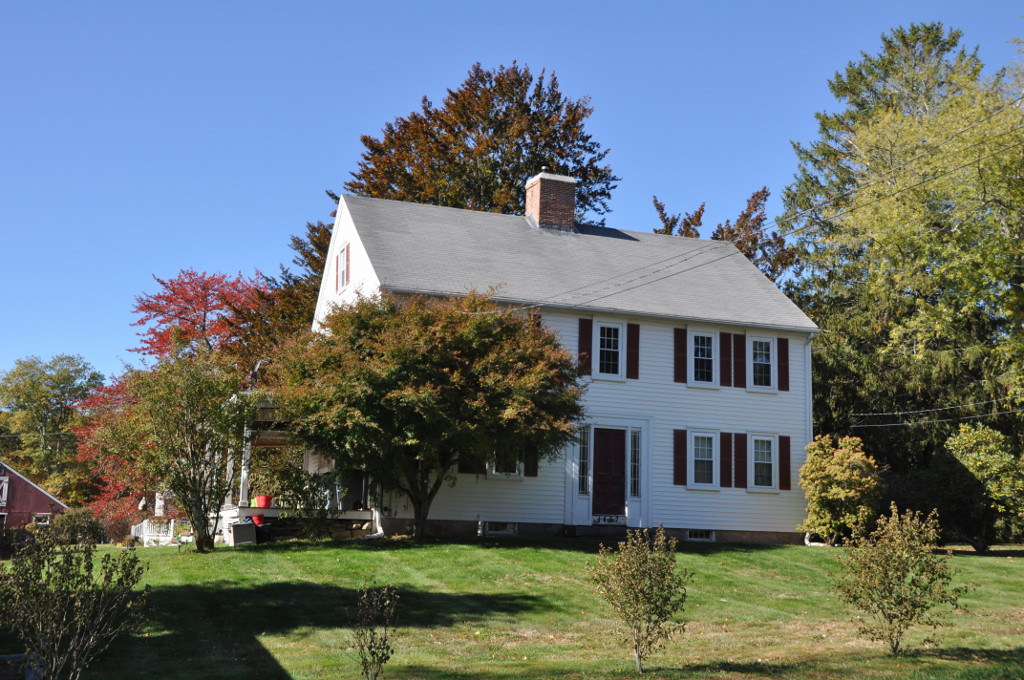

- Location within Rhode Island Location within the United States
- Location: 1455 Chopmist Hill Road, Scituate, Rhode Island
- Coordinates: 41°48′31″N 71°39′41″W
- Area: 3.84 acres (1.55 ha)
- Built: 1812
- Architectural style: Federal
- NRHP reference No.: 79000054
- Added to NRHP: October 30, 1979

The Amos Cooke House is an historic house in Scituate, Rhode Island. Built in 1812, it is a 2 1/2-story wood-frame structure, five bays wide, with a large central chimney. The center entry is framed by a Greek Revival surround that was a later alteration, and there is a shed-roof porch extending along the southern (left) facade. The house has retained much of its interior woodwork. The house was built by Augustus and Carver Hopkins, members of Rhode Island's prominent Hopkins family. It was purchased, along with a number of farm outbuildings, by Amos Cook in 1865, and was converted into a summer residence in the early 20th century.

The house was listed on the National Register of Historic Places in 1979.

== See also ==
- National Register of Historic Places listings in Providence County, Rhode Island
