= John Corcoran (Medal of Honor) =

- Born: June 24, 1842; Pawtucket, Rhode Island
- Died: June 19, 1919 (aged 76)
- Burial place: Pawtucket, Rhode Island
- Military career
- Allegiance: United States of America
- Branch: United States Army; Union Army
- Rank: Private
- Unit: Battery G, 1st Regiment Rhode Island Volunteer Light Artillery
- Conflicts: Third Battle of Petersburg
- Awards: Medal of Honor

John Corcoran (June 24, 1842 - December 2, 1915) was an American soldier who received the Medal of Honor for valor during the American Civil War.

== Biography ==
Corcoran served in the Union Army in the 1st Rhode Island Light Artillery for the Union Army. He received the Medal of Honor on November 2, 1887 for his actions at the Third Battle of Petersburg.

== Medal of Honor citation ==
Citation:

Was one of a detachment of 20 picked artillerymen who voluntarily accompanied an infantry assaulting party, and who turned upon the enemy the guns captured in the assault.

== See also ==
- List of American Civil War Medal of Honor recipients: A-F
