= McGonagle Site, RI-1227 =

- U.S. National Register of Historic Places
- Location: Scituate, Rhode Island
- Built: 1807
- NRHP reference No.: 85002400
- Added to NRHP: September 12, 1985

McGonagle Site, RI-1227 is a historic site in Scituate, Rhode Island, United States.

The house on the site was constructed in 1807 and the house and cemetery were added to the National Register of Historic Places in 1985.
