= Archibald Molbone =

- Born: May 3, 1840; Coventry, Rhode Island, US
- Died: February 28, 1912 (aged 71); Scituate, Rhode Island, US
- Burial place: Burton Potter Cemetery, Scituate, Rhode Island, US
- Military career
- Allegiance: United States
- Branch: United States Army
- Service years: 1862–1865
- Rank: Sergeant
- Unit: Battery G, 1st Rhode Island Volunteer Light Artillery
- Conflicts: Third Battle of Petersburg
- Awards: Medal of Honor

Archibald Molbone (1840–1912) (real name was "Archibald Malbone") was a soldier from Rhode Island who received the Medal of Honor for heroism during the American Civil War.

== Biography ==
Archibald Molbone was born in Coventry, Rhode Island, on May 3, 1840. He was the son of John Malbone and Huldah Corey and was living in West Greenwich, Rhode Island, when he enlisted in the Union Army.

He enlisted in Battery C, 1st Rhode Island Light Artillery on August 11, 1862, and was mustered into service the same day. During his service with Battery C he was promoted to the rank of corporal.

He transferred to Battery G, 1st Rhode Island Light Artillery on December 29, 1864, and was promoted to sergeant on the same day. He fought at the Third Battle of Petersburg, Virginia on April 2, 1865. During the battle, he was one of 20 hand-picked artillerymen who accompanied an infantry assault which captured Confederate artillery pieces which were turned on the Confederates. He received the Medal of Honor on June 20, 1866. He was mustered out of service on June 24, 1865, with the rank of sergeant.

After the war, Malbone had settled in Coventry, Rhode Island, as of 1870, where the census listed is occupation as "farm laborer". By 1885, he had moved to Scituate, Rhode Island, where the state census listed his occupation as "hustler". He was married to Mary Frances Marcure (1846–1909), with whom he had a son and three daughters.

Malbone died on February 28, 1912. He is buried in the Burton Potter Cemetery on Field Hill Road in the Clayville section of Scituate.

== Name confusion ==
On census records and in the report of the Adjutant General of Rhode Island for 1865, his name is listed as "Archibald Malbone". The name on his grave marker is "Archibald Malbourne" rather than "Archibald Molbone", which is the name that appears on the roll of Medal of Honor recipients. The misspelling of his last name is most likely a clerical error.

== Medal of Honor citation ==
Was one of a detachment of 20 picked artillerymen who voluntarily accompanied an infantry assaulting party and who turned upon the enemy the guns captured in the assault.
