= Clayville, Rhode Island =

Census-designated place in Rhode Island, United States

- Census-designated place
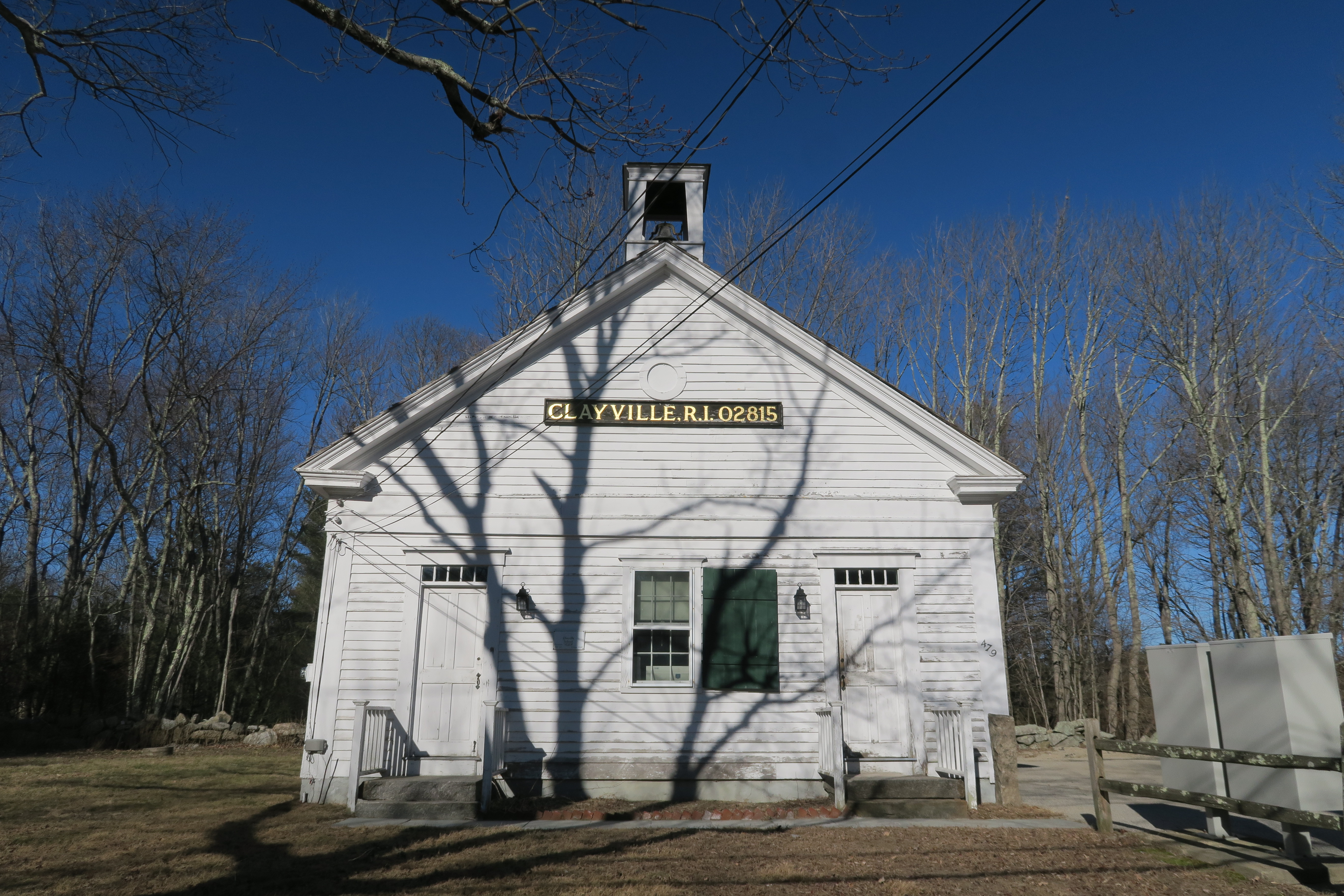
- Post Office

- Location of the CDP in Providence County and the state of Rhode Island.
- Coordinates: 41°46′37″N 71°40′34″W
- Country: United States
- State: Rhode Island
- County: Providence

Area
  - Total: 1.75 sq mi (4.52 km^{2})
  - Land: 1.73 sq mi (4.47 km^{2})
  - Water: 0.019 sq mi (0.05 km^{2})
- Elevation: 446 ft (136 m)

Population (2020)
  - Total: 312
  - Density: 181.0/sq mi (69.87/km^{2})
- Time zone: UTC-5 (Eastern (EST))
  - Summer (DST): UTC-4 (EDT)
- ZIP code: 02825 (Foster), 02815 (Scituate)
- Area code: 401
- FIPS code: 44-15940
- GNIS feature ID: 1218580

Clayville is a census-designated place mostly in the town of Foster, with the remainder in Scituate in Providence County, Rhode Island, United States. As of the 2020 census, Clayville had a population of 312. It is the location of the Clayville Historic District.

== Geography ==
According to the U.S. Census Bureau, Clayville has a total area of 1.75 square miles (4.52 km^{2}), of which 1.73 square miles (4.47 km^{2}) is land and 0.019 square miles (0.05 km^{2}), or 1.10%, is water.

Clayville is located on Rhode Island Route 14 and 102. Route 14 leads east to Providence and west to Moosup, while Route 102 leads north to Woonsocket and south to Exeter, Rhode Island. Clayville is located near the Westconnaug Reservoir and the Westconnaug Meadows, a wooded area home to various hiking trails that is owned by the Scituate Land Trust.

== Demographics ==
Historical population
Census	Pop.	Note	%±
2020	312		—
U.S. Decennial Census
