= Clayville Historic District =

Historic district in Rhode Island, United States

- U.S. National Register of Historic Places
- U.S. Historic district
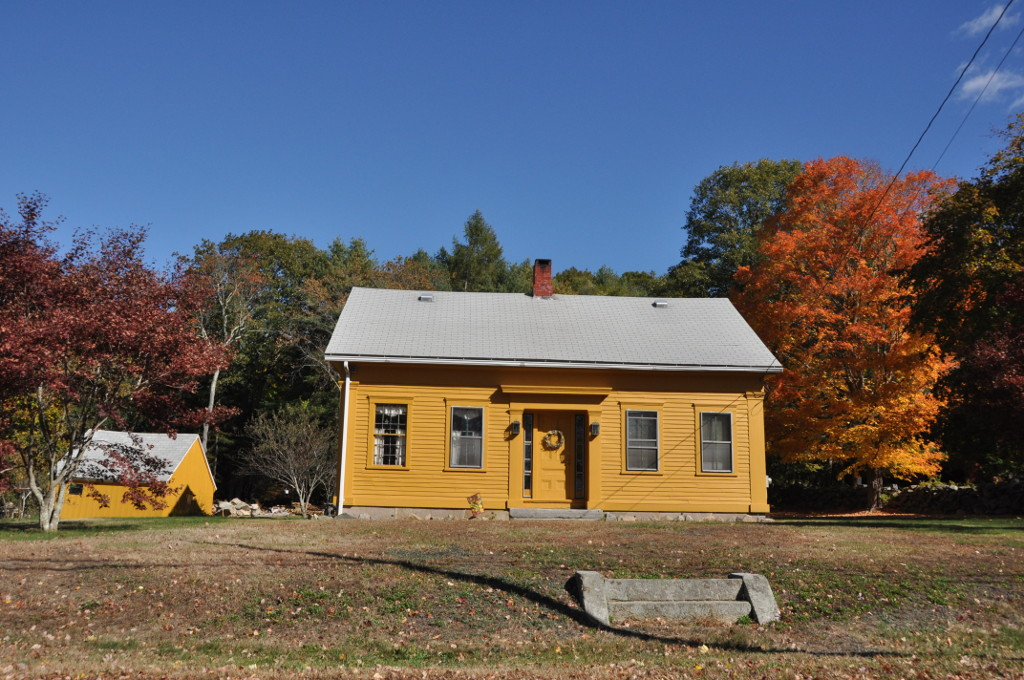

- Location within Rhode Island Location within the United States
- Location: Roughly bounded by Cole Ave., Plainfield Pike, Field Hill Rd., and Victory Hwy., Foster and Scituate, Rhode Island
- Coordinates: 41°46′37″N 71°40′35″W
- Area: 81 acres (33 ha)
- Architectural style: Greek Revival, Late Victorian
- MPS: Foster MPS
- NRHP reference No.: 88003079
- Added to NRHP: December 29, 1988

Clayville Historic District is an 81-acre (33 ha) historic district in Foster and Scituate, Rhode Island. The district encompasses the heart of the village of Clayville, a small 19th-century mill village. It is centered on the junction of Plainfield Pike, Field Hill Road, and Victory Highway near the Clayville Mill pond, and is roughly bisected by the town line between Foster and Scituate. The mill pond is impounded by a c. 1847 dam, which powered mills whose ruins and waterways lie downstream. The village is mainly residential, with vernacular 19th-century construction predominating. Notable buildings include the Clayville Christian Union Church, built 1867–71 with Greek Revival styling, and the c. 1845 Clayville Schoolhouse.

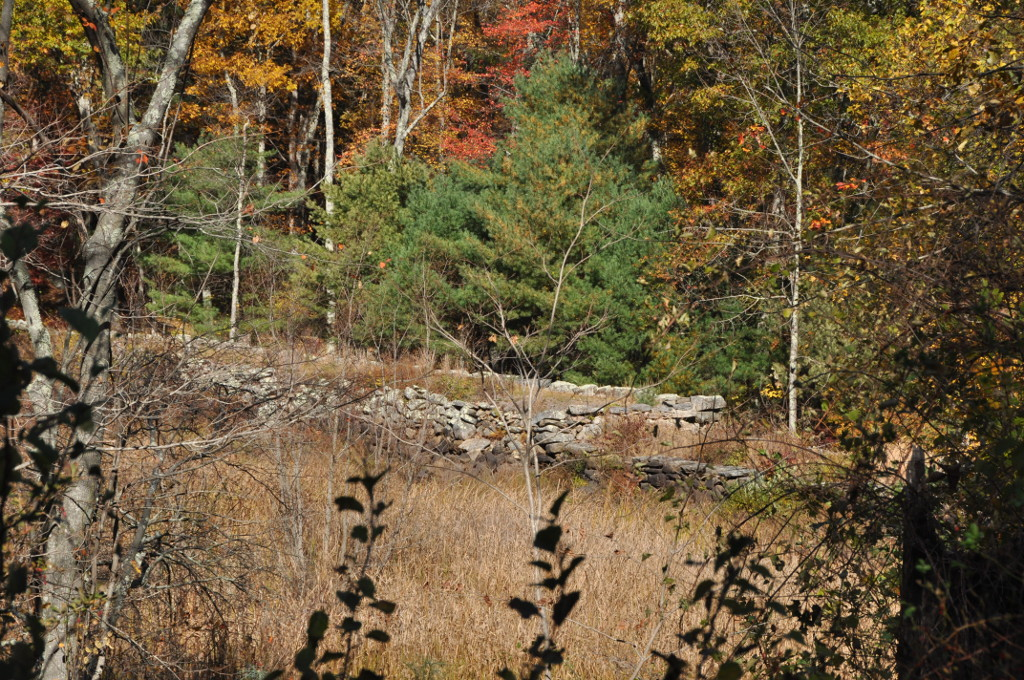
Remnant mill foundations at the northern end of the district

The district was added to the National Register of Historic Places in 1988.

== See also ==
- National Register of Historic Places listings in Providence County, Rhode Island
