= Dexter Arnold Farmstead =

Historic house in Rhode Island, United States

- U.S. National Register of Historic Places
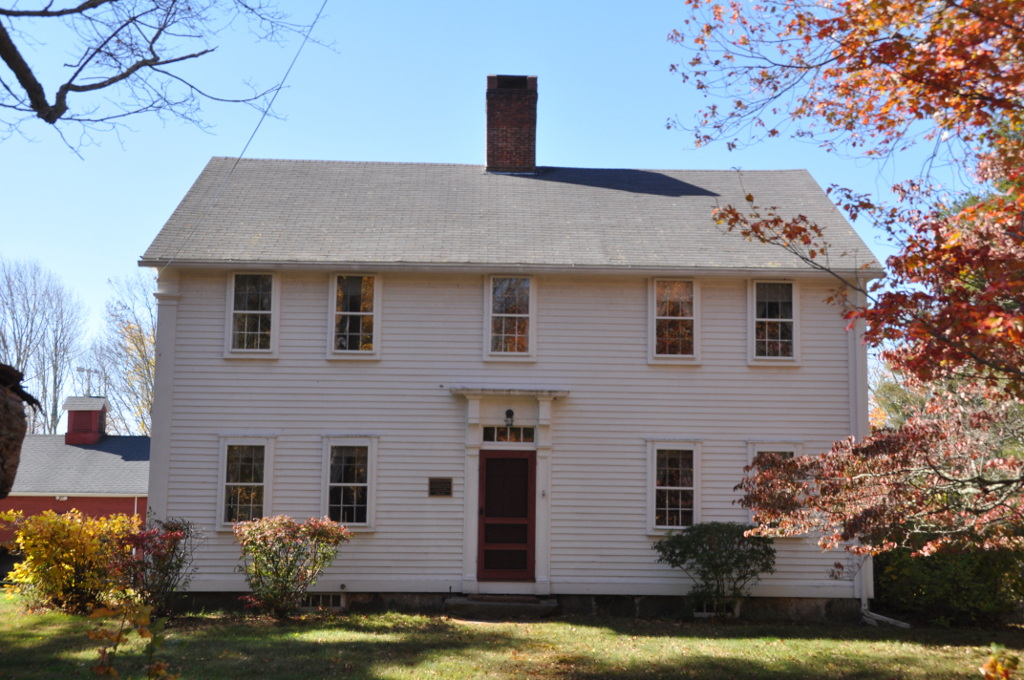

- Location within Rhode Island Location within the United States
- Location: Scituate, Rhode Island
- Coordinates: 41°48′59″N 71°39′54″W
- Area: 3.6 acres (1.5 ha)
- Built: 1813
- Architectural style: Federal
- NRHP reference No.: 77001586
- Added to NRHP: November 25, 1977

The Dexter Arnold Farmstead is a historic farmstead on Chopmist Hill Road (Rhode Island Route 102) in Scituate, Rhode Island. The main house, a 2 1/2-story wood-frame structure five bays wide, with a large central chimney, was built in 1813. The 3.6-acre (1.5 ha) property also has five outbuildings which appear (based in part on photographs of the property from 1860) to be near contemporaries to the house, a relative rarity in rural Rhode Island. The main barn survived into the 20th century, but was destroyed by the New England Hurricane of 1938. The property also includes a small family cemetery. The house, built by Dexter Arnold in land belonging to his father, remained in family hands until 1975.

The farmhouse was listed on the National Register of Historic Places in 1977.

== See also ==
- National Register of Historic Places listings in Providence County, Rhode Island
