= Vera Kenmure =

Congregational minister and first woman minister in Scotland (1904–1973)

- best image available (from a tee shirt)
- Born: Vera Mary Muir Findlay; 13 February 1904; Glasgow, Scotland
- Died: 27 December 1973 (aged 69); Aberdeen, Scotland
- Education: University of Glasgow
- Known for: 1st woman ordained as Scottish Minister
- Children: 1

Vera Mary Muir Kenmure born Vera Mary Muir Findlay (13 February 1904 – 27 December 1973) was a British Congregational minister. She was the first woman minister ordained in Scotland to be in charge of a church. She founded her own church in Partick after objections were raised, by some of her congregation, to her becoming a mother while still a minister.

== Life ==
Kenmure was born in Glasgow where she attended Hillhead before going on to attend Scottish Congregational College. She went on to Glasgow University. After university she hoped to be minister and have her own church. At the time this was impossible for a woman but Kenmure was considered an exceptional candidate. On 29 April 1929 the Scottish Congregational Union amended their own constitution to note that a minister could be a man or a woman. This made her path clear as she had already been invited to be the parson at Partick Congregational Church and she was ordained on 4 November 1928. She was the first woman to be minister in charge of a church. She was not the first minister in Scotland as Olive Winchester had been ordained in 1912 by the Sixth Annual Assembly of the Pentecostal Church of Scotland.

Kenmure proved an eloquent minister and she attracted crowds and a growing congregation. In 1933 she married Colin Frame Kenmure which was news met with celebration among the congregation, but it turned bad the following year. She resigned as minister at the baptism of her son, Alasdair. She would have been happy to continue as both a minister and mother but she had received anonymous letters and she had come to the conclusion that this section of her church would not accept that a mother could be a minister. She formed her own church, Christ Church Congregational, and this attracted many former members of the church she had resigned from.

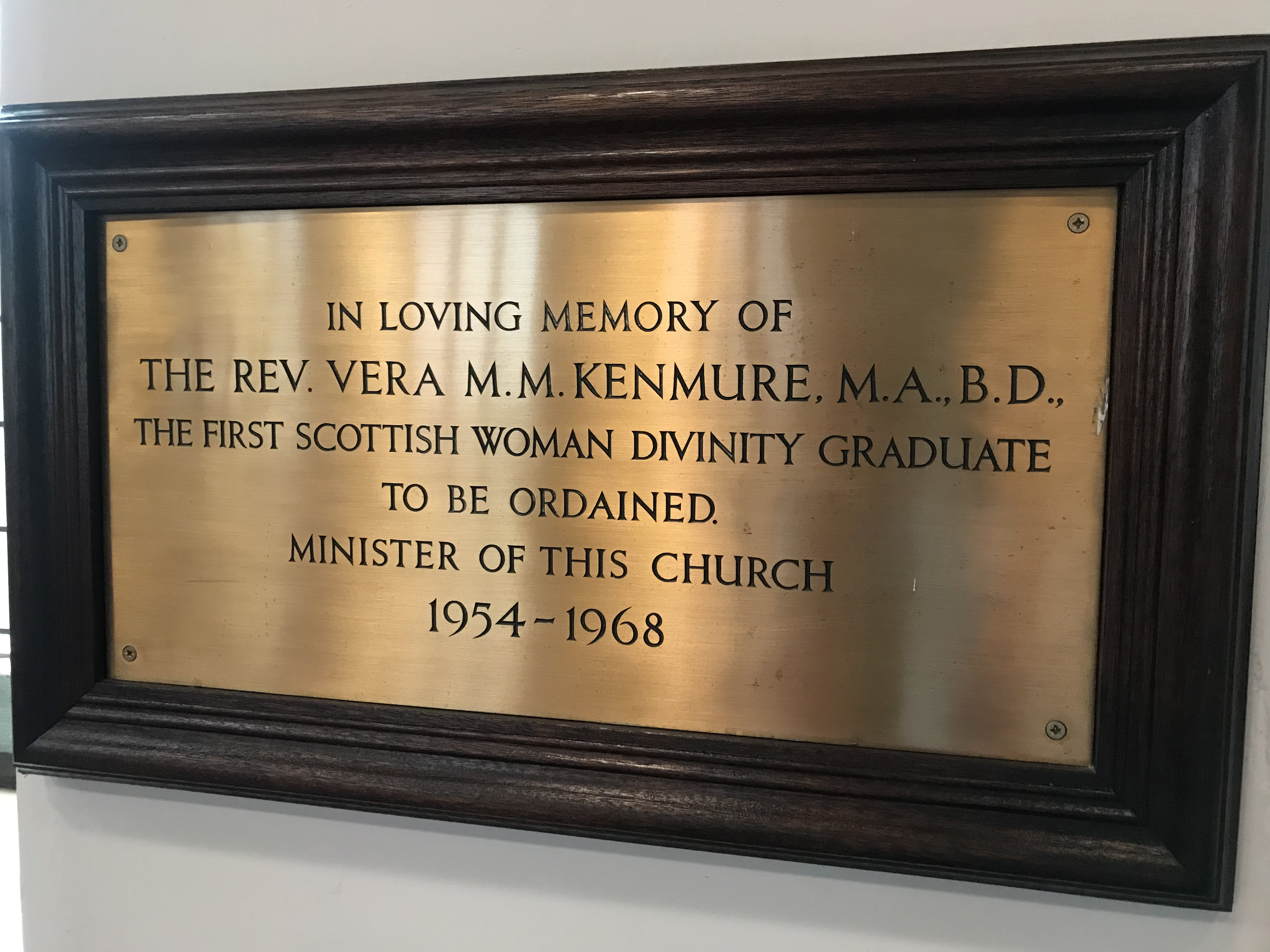
Vera Kenmure plaque in Pollokshields Congregational church

The situation was resolved in 1936 when the mother church of Hillhead invited her to become their minister and for every member of her church to join their congregation. This enjoyed popular support and she served at that church until 1945.

She became the first woman to be the president of the Congregational Union in 1951.

Kenmure retired from Pollokshields Congregational church in 1968.

== Death and legacy ==
Kenmure died in Aberdeen in 1973. There is a memorial plaque in her Pollockshiels church. Her robes are held by Glasgow Museums. In 2018 on the 50th anniversary of her becoming a pastor, 500 women ministers assembled at the General Assembly to each wear a tee shirt carrying Kenmure's image.
