= John H. Havron =

Irish–American Medal of Honor recipient (1843–1910)

- Born: December 23, 1843; Ireland
- Died: October 28, 1910 (aged 66); New Orleans, Louisiana, US
- Burial place: New Orleans
- Military career
- Allegiance: United States
- Branch: US Army
- Service years: 1861-1865
- Rank: Sergeant
- Unit: Battery G, 1st Rhode Island Light Artillery
- Conflicts: American Civil War: Third Battle of Petersburg
- Awards: Medal of Honor

John Henry Havron (December 23, 1843 – October 28, 1910) was an American soldier who fought in the American Civil War. Havron received the United States' highest award for bravery during combat, the Medal of Honor. Havron's medal was won for his extraordinary heroism during the Third Battle of Petersburg, in Virginia on April 2, 1865. He was honored with the award on May 12, 1865.

Havron was born in Ireland, and entered service in Providence, Rhode Island. He died in 1910 in New Orleans, Louisiana.

== Medal of Honor citation ==
The President of the United States of America, in the name of Congress, takes pleasure in presenting the Medal of Honor to Sergeant John H. Havron, United States Army, for extraordinary heroism on 2 April 1865, while serving with Company G, 1st Rhode Island Light Artillery, in action at Petersburg, Virginia. Sergeant Havron was one of a detachment of 20 picket artillerymen who voluntarily accompanied an infantry assaulting party and who turned upon the enemy the guns captured in the assault.

== Legacy ==
A road at Fort Sill near Lawton, Oklahoma, is named after John H. Havron.

== See also ==
- List of American Civil War Medal of Honor recipients: G–L
- Third Battle of Petersburg
- Battery G, 1st Rhode Island Light Artillery
