= James A. Barber =

American Civil War soldier and Medal of Honor recipient (1841–1925)

- Born: July 11, 1841; Westerly, Rhode Island, U.S.
- Died: June 26, 1925 (aged 83)
- Military career
- Allegiance: United States of America
- Branch: United States Army
- Service years: 11 November 1861 – June 1865
- Rank: Corporal
- Unit: Battery G, 1st Regiment Rhode Island Volunteer Light Artillery
- Conflicts: Third Battle of Petersburg
- Awards: Medal of Honor

Corporal James Albert Barber (July 11, 1841 – June 26, 1925) was an American soldier who fought in the American Civil War. Barber was awarded the country's highest award for bravery during combat, the Medal of Honor, for his action at Petersburg, Virginia in April 1865. He was presented with the award on June 20, 1866.

== Biography ==
Barber enlisted as an artillery man in the First Rhode Island Light Artillery on November 11, 1861 at age 20. He was among a twenty-member detachment of his company, Battery G., along with an infantry assaulting party, that captured enemy weapons and assaulted enemy forces, on 2 April 1865.

== Medal of Honor citation ==
Was one of a detachment of 20 picked artillerymen who voluntarily accompanied an infantry assaulting party, and who turned upon the enemy the guns captured in the assault.

== See also ==
- List of American Civil War Medal of Honor recipients: A–F
