= Scituate, Rhode Island =

- Town
- Seal

- Location in Providence County and the state of Rhode Island
- Coordinates: 41°47′N 71°37′W
- Country: United States
- State: Rhode Island
- County: Providence
- Incorporated: 1731

Government
  - Type: Town commission
  - Town Council: Theresa Yeaw (R); David A. D'Agostino (R); Michael Marcello (R); James Brady Jr. (R); Abbie Groves (R); Gary Grande (R); Tim McCormick (R)

Area
  - Total: 54.8 sq mi (141.9 km^{2})
  - Land: 48.7 sq mi (126.1 km^{2})
  - Water: 6.1 sq mi (15.8 km^{2})
- Elevation: 345 ft (105 m)

Population (2020)
  - Total: 10,384
  - Density: 213/sq mi (82.3/km^{2})
- Time zone: UTC−5 (Eastern (EST))
  - Summer (DST): UTC−4 (EDT)
- ZIP Codes: 02815 (Clayville), 02823 (Fiskeville), 02825 (Foster), 02831 (Hope), 02857 (North Scituate)
- Area code: 401
- FIPS code: 44-64220
- GNIS feature ID: 1220077
- Website: Town of Scituate

Scituate (/ˈsɪtʃueɪt, -ɪt/; SIH-choo-ayt, -it) is a town in Providence County, Rhode Island, United States. The population was 10,384 at the 2020 census.

== History ==
Scituate was first settled in 1710 by emigrants from Scituate, Massachusetts. The original spelling of the town's name was "Satuit", a Native American word meaning "cold brook" or "cold river." The town was a part of Providence until 1731.

Scituate's first town meeting was held at the Angell Tavern in South Scituate, with Stephen Hopkins elected as the first moderator and Joseph Brown as clerk. Stephen Hopkins later became a governor of Rhode Island and was a signer of the Declaration of Independence. His brother, Esek Hopkins, was commander in chief of the Continental Navy beginning in 1776.

In 1788, Scituate representative, militia general and Supreme Court Justice William West led an armed anti-federalist mob of farmers into Providence to protest the U.S. Constitution.

In 1791, the U.S. Supreme Court decided its first case, West v. Barnes, regarding a farm in Scituate.

Scituate was once made up of a multitude of small villages, including North Scituate, Hope, Ashland, Clayville, Elmdale, Fiskeville, Glenn Rock, Harrisdale, Jackson, Kent, Ponaganset, Potterville, Richmond, Rockland, Saundersville, and South Scituate. Foster was incorporated as a separate town in 1781, taking the western half of Scituate.

In 1915, the Rhode Island General Assembly voted to take 14,800 acres (60 km^{2}) of land in Scituate (38% of the town) to create a reservoir to supply fresh water to greater Providence. This project resulted in the condemnation of "1,195 buildings, including 375 houses, seven schools, six churches, six mills, thirty dairy farms, eleven ice houses, post offices, and an electric railway system, the Providence and Danielson Railway system". The hamlets of Kent, Richmond, Rockland, South Scituate, Ashland, Saundersville, Ponaganset, and parts of North Scituate and Clayville disappeared forever.

Scituate has played an important role in many wars. During the Revolutionary War, 76 cannons were forged at the Hope Furnace in the village of Hope in southern Scituate. During World War II, a Federal Communications Commission Radio Intelligence Division monitoring facility on Darby Road near Chopmist Hill (41°49′11″N 71°38′43″W) intercepted German HF communications. Because of this, in 1946, the Chopmist Hill area was considered as a candidate for the location of the headquarters of the United Nations.

== Geography ==
According to the United States Census Bureau, the town has a total area of 54.8 square miles (141.9 km^{2}), of which 48.7 square miles (126.1 km^{2}) is land and 6.1 square miles (15.8 km^{2}) (11.15%) is water. It contains part of the census-designated place of Clayville.

=== Scituate Reservoir ===
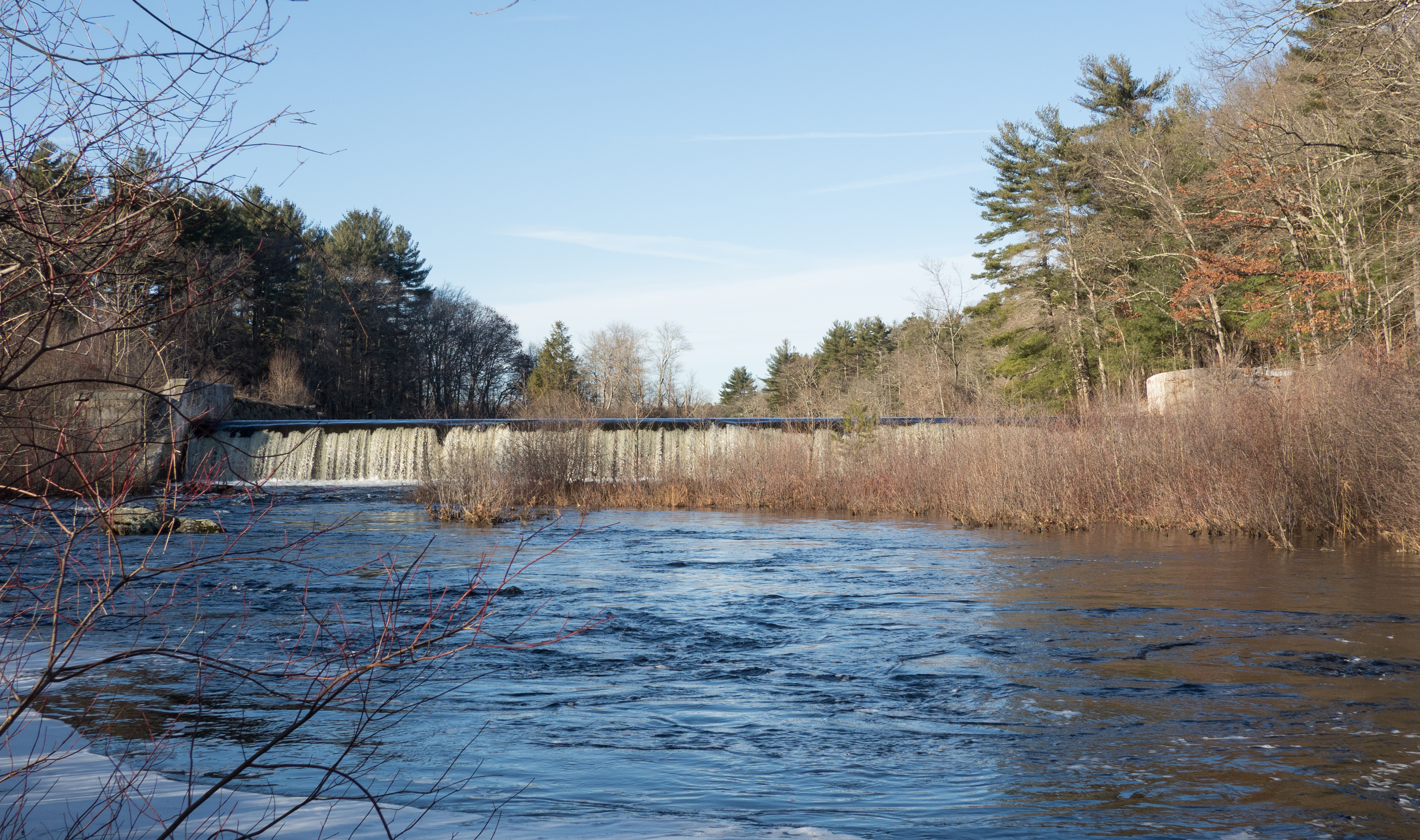
The Hope Dam on the Pawtuxet River

One of the most prominent features of the town is the Scituate Reservoir. The large reservoir spans a large portion of Scituate and has forever changed the face of the town. During the construction of the reservoir, numerous villages were flooded along the former banks of the Pawtuxet River. Some foundations of the old structures are still visible today during times of drought. The reservoir and a large portion of land surrounding it is owned and maintained by the Providence Water Supply Board.

The main Scituate reservoir was formed by the construction of a dam across the Pawtuxet River at the former village of Kent. The dam, principally of earth, is about 3,200 feet (980 m) long and 100 feet (30 m) high. Water storage in the reservoir began on November 10, 1925. An aqueduct from the dam feeds the nearby treatment plant, which was placed in operation on September 30, 1926.

The Scituate Reservoir is the largest artificial freshwater body of water in the state of Rhode Island. It has an aggregate capacity of 39 billion US gallons (150×10^{6} m^{3}) and a surface area of 5.3 square miles (14 square kilometers). It and its six tributary reservoirs—which make up a total surface area of 7.2 sq mi (19 km^{2})—supply drinking water to more than 60 percent of the state population. The surrounding drainage basin that provides water to the reservoir system covers an area of about 94 sq mi (240 km^{2}), which includes most of the town of Scituate and parts of Foster, Glocester, Johnston, and Cranston. The Scituate Reservoir is operated by the Providence Water Supply Board.

The original treatment plant was state-of-the-art at the time of its construction. The plant was considered to be among the most technologically advanced of its day, and for many years the filtration system was the only plant of its type in New England. As demand continued to grow, the treatment plant underwent major expansions and renovations in the 1940s and again in the 1960s. Today, the plant has a maximum treatment capacity of 144 million US gallons (550,000 m^{3}) of water per day and still remains the largest treatment facility in New England.

== Politics ==
Scituate is the most Republican town in Rhode Island. In the 2008 U.S. presidential election, Scituate was the only town in Rhode Island to vote for John McCain, 51%–47% over Barack Obama. It is the only town in Rhode Island to vote Republican in every presidential election since 2000. Despite this, in earlier days the town was solidly Democratic, with Democrat William Jennings Bryan carrying the town in 1908 United States presidential election despite losing statewide by 25 points.

In the 2016 presidential election, Donald Trump won 60.2% of the vote in Scituate. Opponent Hillary Clinton received 34.8% of the town vote. In 2020, Donald Trump received 57.0% of the town vote, to Joe Biden's 40.9% In the concurrent Senate election, incumbent Democratic Senator Jack Reed received 50.25% of the town vote, to Republican Allen Waters' 49.57%.

== Demographics ==
Historical population
Census	Pop.	Note	%±
1790	2,315		—
1800	2,523		9.0%
1810	2,568		1.8%
1820	2,834		10.4%
1830	3,993		40.9%
1840	4,090		2.4%
1850	4,582		12.0%
1860	4,251		−7.2%
1870	3,846		−9.5%
1880	3,810		−0.9%
1890	3,174		−16.7%
1900	3,361		5.9%
1910	3,493		3.9%
1920	3,006		−13.9%
1930	2,292		−23.8%
1940	2,838		23.8%
1950	3,905		37.6%
1960	5,210		33.4%
1970	7,489		43.7%
1980	8,405		12.2%
1990	9,796		16.5%
2000	10,324		5.4%
2010	10,329		0.0%
2020	10,384		0.5%
U.S. Decennial Census

As of the census of 2020, there were 10,384 people and 4,275 households in the town. The population density was 215.7 inhabitants per square mile (83.3/km^{2}). There were 4,263 housing units in the town. The racial makeup of the town was 93.08% White, 0.63% African American, 0.13% Native American, 0.91% Asian, 0.91% from other races, and 4.32% from two or more races. Hispanic or Latino people of any race were 2.86% of the population.

There were 4,275 households, out of which 21.0% had children under the age of 18 living with them, 63.5% were married couples living together, 14.6% had a female householder with no spouse present, and 13.0% had a male householder with no spouse present. 9.4% of all households were made up of individuals, and 2.2% had someone living alone who was 65 years of age or older. The average household size was 2.44 and the average family size was 2.72.

In the town, the population was spread out, with 15.3% under the age of 18, 6.3% from 18 to 24, 23.5% from 25 to 44, 30.1% from 45 to 64, and 24.9% who were 65 years of age or older. The median age was 49.7 years.

The median income for a household in the town was $116,047, and the median income for a family was $133,045. The per capita income for the town was $56,645. About 5.0% of the population were below the poverty line, including 1.9% of those under age 18 and 9.0% of those age 65 or over.

== Education ==
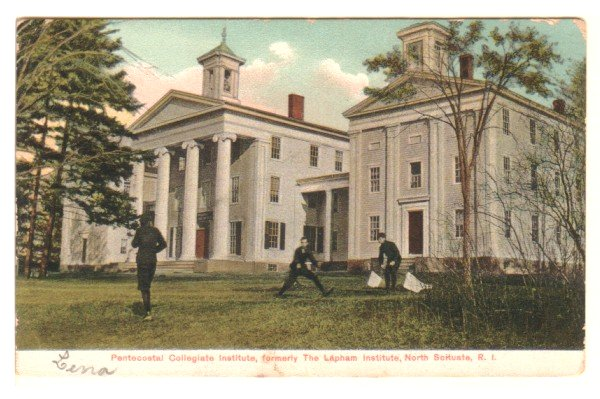
The Pentecostal Collegiate Institute in North Scituate, 1905

In 1839, the Smithville Seminary, a Freewill Baptist institution was founded in North Scituate. It existed on and off as an educational institution until it finally closed in 1876. The Pentecostal Collegiate Institute moved to the former campus from Saratoga Springs, New York in 1902. When PCI became Eastern Nazarene College and left in 1919, William Holland purchased the property. He moved his Watchman Industrial School and Camp there in 1923. It was allegedly burned several times by the local Ku Klux Klan in the 1920s and 1930s, and closed in 1938, although the summer camp operated until 1974. The Greek Revival buildings and campus are now the Scituate Commons, an apartment complex on Institute Lane.

High school students in Scituate attend Scituate High School.

== Scituate Art Festival ==
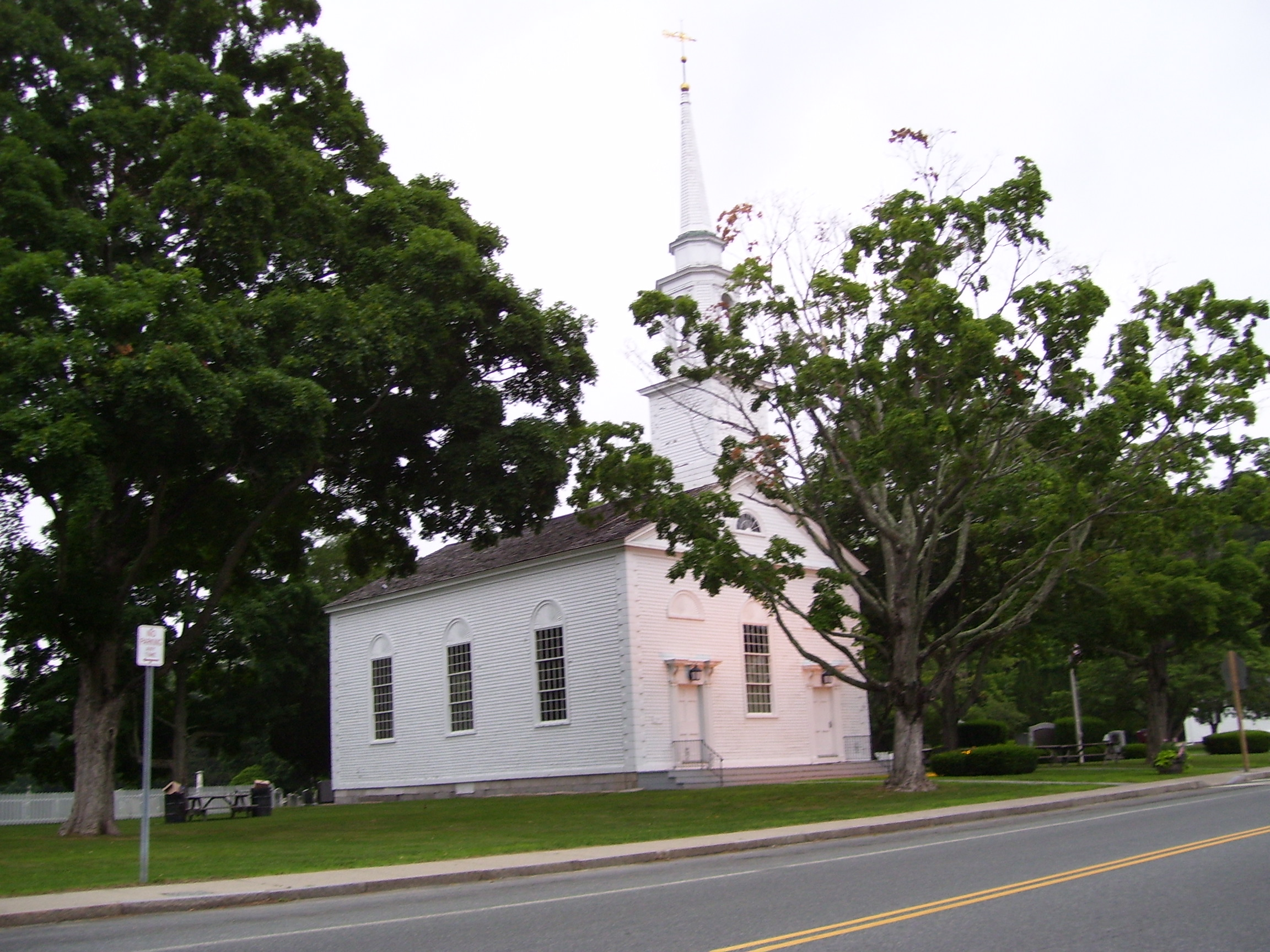
Old Congregational Church

The Scituate Art Festival, held every Columbus Day weekend since 1967, features over 300 artists and craftspeople displaying and selling their artwork in the picturesque New England village. Visitors number in the 200,000 to 350,000 range per festival. The Old Congregational Church grounds are used for part of the festival.

== National historic places and notable sites ==
- Andrews–Luther Farm (1768)
- Dexter Arnold Farmstead (1813)
- Battey–Barden House
- Clayville Historic District
- Amos Cooke House (1812)

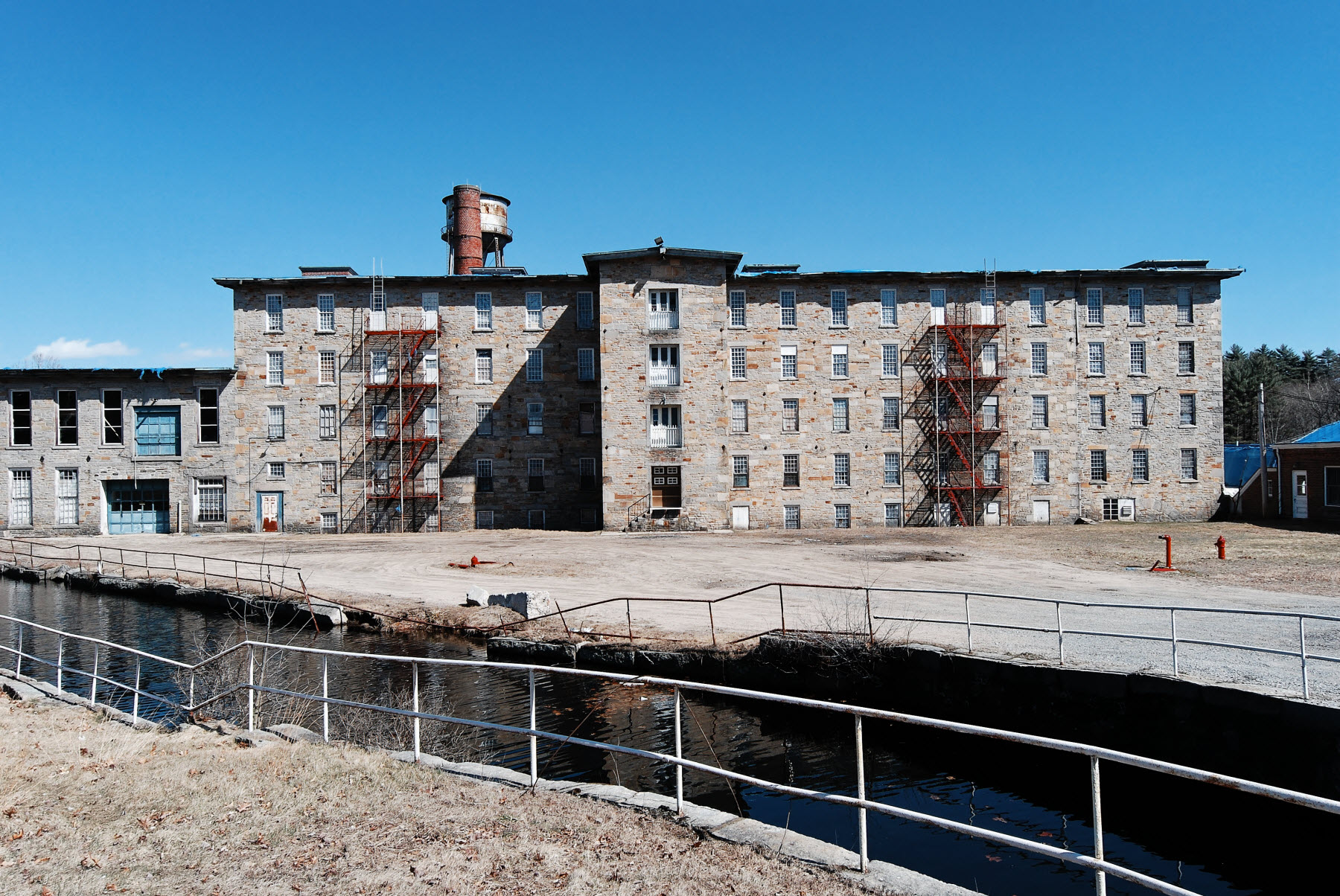
Hope Mill

- Double L Site, RI-958
- Hope Village Historic District
- McGonagle Site, RI-1227
- Millrace Site, RI-1039
- Moswansicut Pond Site, RI-960
- Old Congregational Church (North Scituate, Rhode Island) (1834)
- Rhode Island State Police Headquarters
- Smithville Seminary (1839)
- Smithville – North Scituate
- Woonasquatucket River Site (RI-163)

== Notable people ==
- Emerson C. Angell, dentist
- James Burrill Angell, president of the University of Michigan and University of Vermont
- Robert Capron, actor, played Rowley Jefferson in the Diary of a Wimpy Kid film series
- Ezekiel Cornell, delegate to the Continental Congress
- Esek Hopkins, Revolutionary War sailor
- Stephen Hopkins, colonial governor of Rhode Island; signer of the Declaration of Independence
- Fenner Kimball, Wisconsin state assemblyman
- Armand LaMontagne, wood sculptor
- Archibald Molbone, Medal of Honor recipient
- Arthur Steere, businessman and politician
- Bob Tasca III, American NHRA funny car driver and team owner
- William West, Revolutionary War general, lt. governor of Rhode Island, chief justice of Rhode Island
