= SS Laconia =

A number of ships have been named Laconia

- RMS Laconia (1911), a Cunard ocean liner torpedoed and sunk on 25 February 1917
- RMS Laconia (1921), a Cunard ocean liner torpedoed and sunk on 12 September 1942
- SS Laconia (1925), a Greek cargo ship in service 1948–65

== See also ==
- TSMS Lakonia, a Greek ocean liner burnt out and sunk in December 1965
