= Samuel E. Lewis =

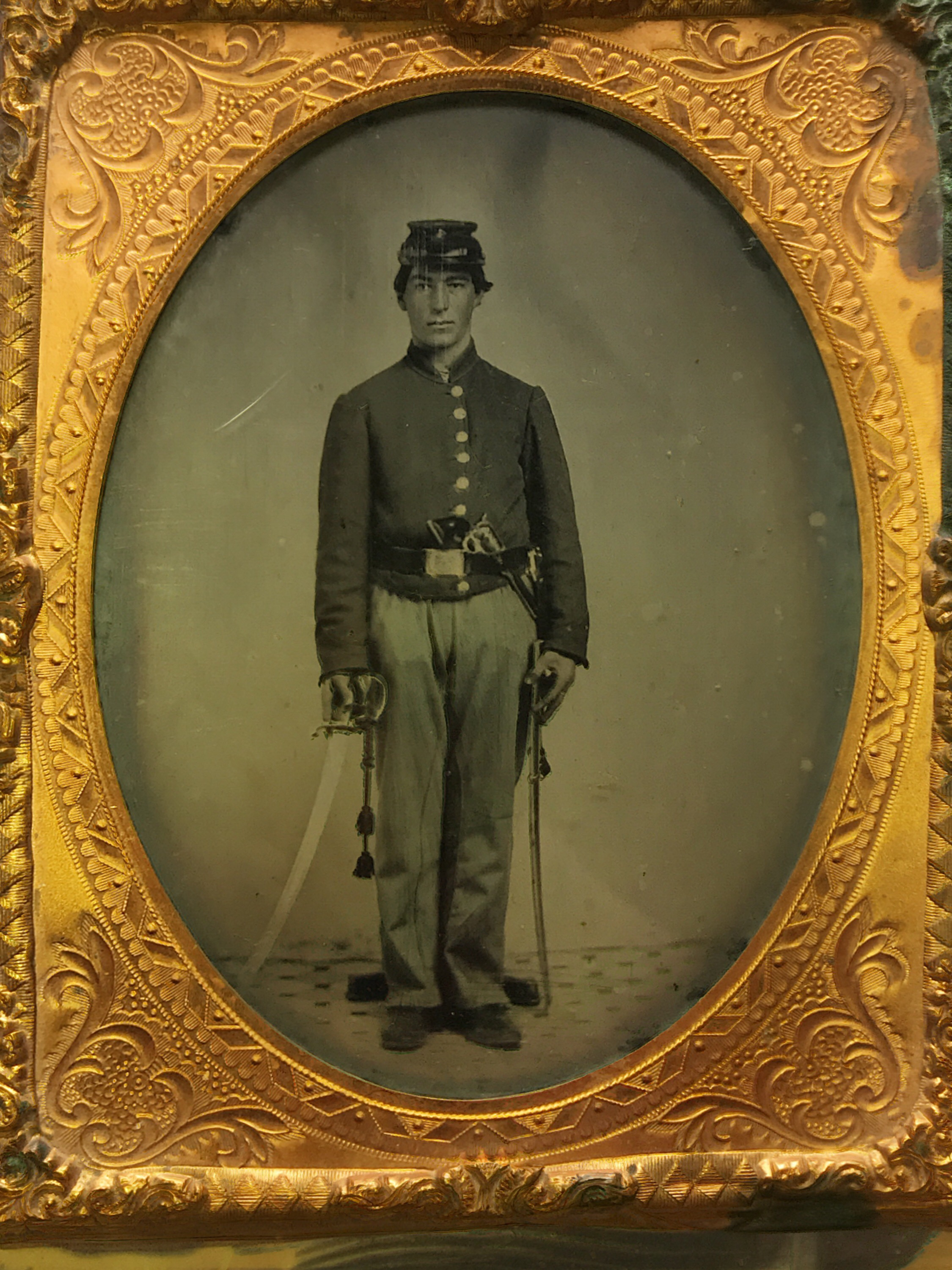
- Samuel Lewis Civil War Photo
- Born: 1840; Coventry, Rhode Island, US
- Died: March 22, 1907
- Military career
- Allegiance: United States of America; Union
- Branch: United States Army; Union Army
- Rank: Corporal
- Unit: Company G, 1st Rhode Island Light Artillery
- Conflicts: American Civil War
- Awards: Medal of Honor

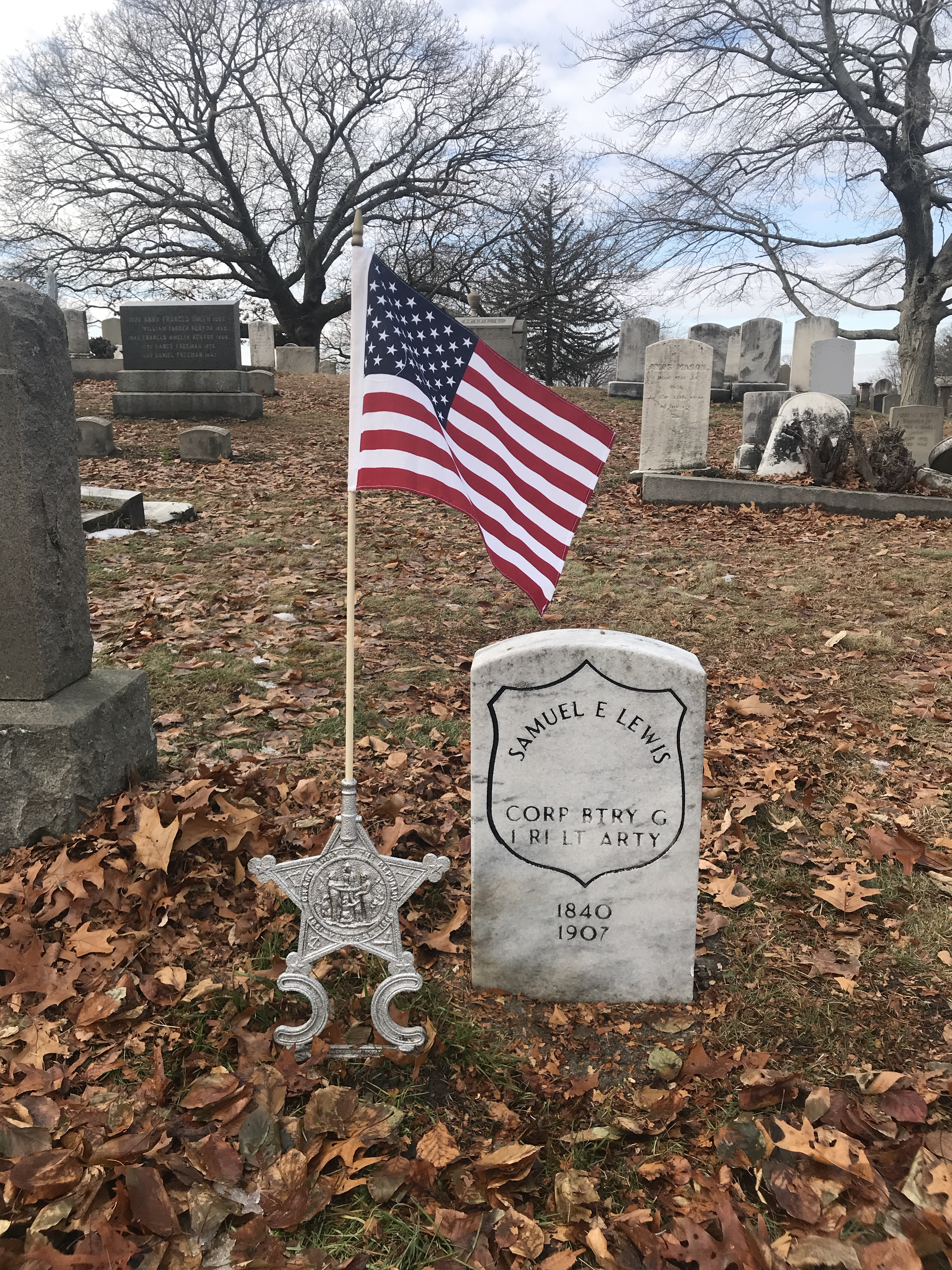
Samuel Lewis Grave Site. Rhode Island

Samuel E. Lewis (1840 - March 22, 1907) was a Corporal in the Union Army and a Medal of Honor recipient for his actions in the American Civil War.

== Medal of Honor citation ==
Rank and organization: Corporal, Company G, 1st Rhode Island Light Artillery. Place and date: At Petersburg, Va., April 2, 1865. Entered service at: Coventry, R.I. Birth: Coventry, R.I. Date of issue: June 16, 1866.

Citation:

Was one of a detachment of 20 picked artillerymen who voluntarily accompanied an infantry assaulting party and who turned upon the enemy the guns captured in the assault.

== See also ==
- List of Medal of Honor recipients
- List of American Civil War Medal of Honor recipients: G–L
