= Pentecostal Collegiate Institute (Rhode Island) =

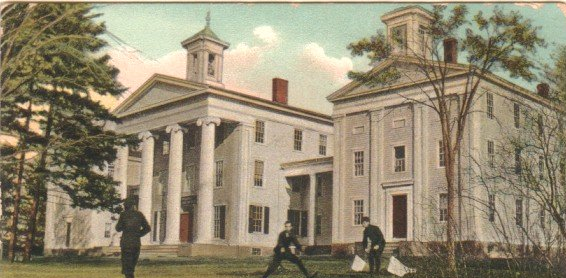
- Pentecostal Collegiate Institute campus (c. 1905)
- Type: Private
- Active: 1902–1918
- Affiliations: Association of Pentecostal Churches of America; Pentecostal Church of the Nazarene
- President: Fred J. Shields (1919)
- Principal: William F. Albrecht (1902-1904); D.C. Thatcher (1904); W.H. Daniels (1905); Walter C. Kinsey (1905-1906); E.E. Angell (1906-1913); Martha Curry (1913-1914); J.C. Bearse (1914-1916); A.R. Archibald (1916-1917); J.E.L. Moore (1917-1919)
- Location: North Scituate, Rhode Island, Rhode Island, United States
- Campus: Rural

- Smithville Seminary
- U.S. National Register of Historic Places
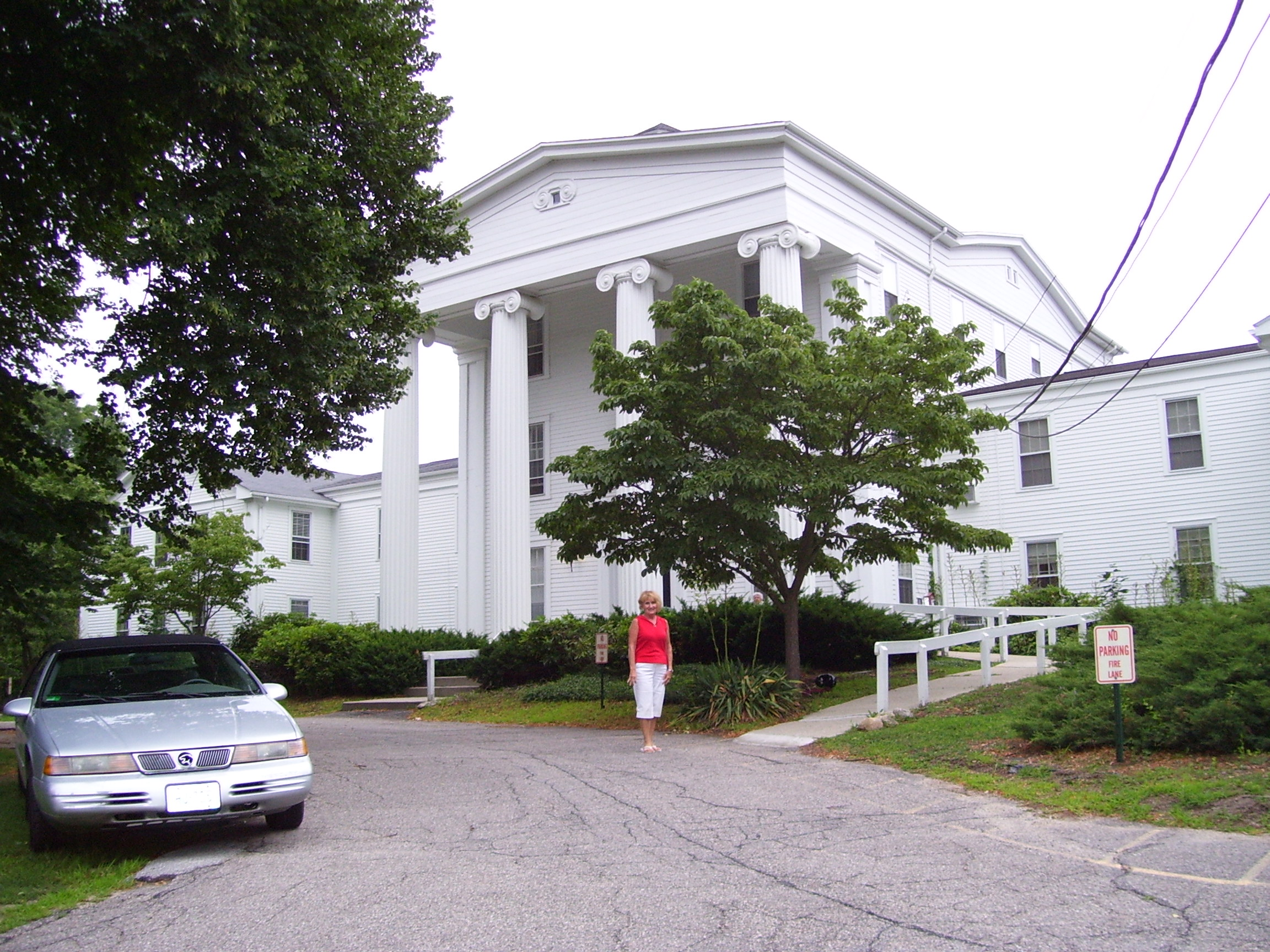
- Pentecostal Collegiate Institute main building in 2008

- Location within Rhode Island Location within the United States
- Location: Scituate, Rhode Island
- Coordinates: 41°50′2″N 71°35′0″W
- Built: 1839
- Architect: Russell Warren
- Architectural style: Greek Revival
- NRHP reference No.: 78003446
- Added to NRHP: March 29, 1978

The Pentecostal Collegiate Institute (PCI) was a co-educational interdenominational collegiate institute located at North Scituate, Rhode Island from September 1902 to 1918. PCI was incorporated in Rhode Island and operated by its own board in association with the Association of Pentecostal Churches of America (until October 1907). The Church of the Nazarene operated it after 1915. It is considered a predecessor to Eastern Nazarene College.

== Location ==
The campus of the Pentecostal Collegiate Institute was located at 29 Institute Lane, North Scituate, Rhode Island, "on a crest between Route 6 and Route 116 and visible from the Village Green".

== History ==
The Pentecostal Collegiate Institute had previously operated as the Pentecostal Collegiate Institute and Bible Seminary in Saratoga Springs, New York from 25 September 1900. Disagreements with its founding president and second principal, Rev. Lyman C. Pettit, resulted in the Educational Committee of the Association of Pentecostal Churches of America (APCA) deciding in May 1902 to dismiss Pettit, and to sell its assets in Saratoga Springs.

The committee relocated the school to North Scituate, Rhode Island, a village roughly 10 miles (16 km) west of Providence. A North Scituate Pentecostal congregation had been located there since its organization during the winter of 1896-1897. When it learned that Pettit had held the Saratoga property in his own name, the APCA had to raise additional funds to purchase a new campus.

The school's financial struggles appeared to add to its difficulties. It had numerous interim principals and short-term leadership for years, making it difficult to accomplish fundraising or to settle on educational goals for the school.

=== William F. Albrecht (1902-1904) ===
Acting on their own initiative, in June 1902 Rev. William F. Albrecht, the founding principal of the Saratoga school and inaugural principal of the relocated institution, and Rev. Fred A. Hillery, the pastor of the People's Pentecostal Church in South Providence, placed an option on the disused facilities of the former Lapham Institute, which had been vacant since 1876.

The facilities comprised a large three-story Greek Revival central building designed by New England architect Russell Warren in 1839. The central building was attached by two-story covered walkways to two separate wings; each had 33 rooms, and housed classrooms, offices, staff apartments, and dining facilities, a library and reading room on the second floor, and a large room on the third floor. Two other buildings served as separate male and female dormitories. Authorized by the Educational Committee, Hillery purchased the Lanham Institute property for $4,500, and arranged a mortgage loan for $3,000.

The APCA Educational Committee voted to organize a separate corporation to administer the new school, with the proviso that it would be dependent upon the APCA. PCI was incorporated in Rhode Island on 17 April 1903. It was incorporated by members of the APCA: Hillery, Henry N. Brown, William H. Bache, Henry M. Randall, and Frank L. Sprague. Members of the Educational Committee sold sufficient stock to finance the purchase and renovations.

Albrecht, Ernest Winslow Perry (1876-1902), a faculty members, and some students who had relocated to Rhode Island worked to renovate the facilities to begin classes. PCI opened for its first classes on 16 September 1902. Most students and faculty refused to move from Saratoga Springs, so Albrecht dropped the liberal arts program.

For several years, the relocated PCI in Rhode Island functioned as a private lower school, offering elementary and secondary education programs, and a college preparatory program.

For the next four years, leaders encountered difficulties in securing students, funds, and teachers. Olive May Winchester (1879-1947) was one of the new faculty. She was a graduate of Radcliffe Ladies College. Winchester taught at PCI until 1909. That year she moved to Scotland to study at the divinity school of the University of Glasgow. While teaching at PCI, Winchester traveled frequently on behalf of the college. She raised money and held services in small communities that lacked regular church services.

Another faculty member was Jesse B. Mowry, who was supporting himself by working as the Superintendent of Schools in Glocester, Rhode Island, and the Commissioner for Forestry for the state.

The first class graduated from PCI in June 1903. Estella "Stella" Adelia Reynolds, the younger daughter of Hiram F. Reynolds, APCA Foreign Missionary Secretary, was the first graduate. The Educational committee authorized Reynolds to act as general agent for PCI.

Albrecht resigned as principal by August 1904. He established the short-lived Hudson River Holiness Institute, an interdenominational co-educational college preparatory school, in the Prospect Park Hotel at Catskill Point. The Holiness Institute closed by June 1905. Albrecht suffered mental illness and in 1910 was living as an inmate of the Hudson River State Hospital, a state psychiatric hospital then operating at Poughkeepsie, New York.

=== David C. Thatcher (1904) ===
Rev. David C. Thatcher (1858) had an interim role for a year.

=== W.H. Daniels (1905) ===
Rev. William Haven Daniels was an interim for one year.

=== Walter C. Kinsey (1905-1906) ===
Rev. Walter C. Kinsey (1861- ) was principal for one year.

=== E.E. Angell (1906-1913) ===
Rev. Ernest E. Angell (1875-1939) became the principal of PCI in 1906. By 1907 the enrollment had increased to eighty-four, overcoming the decrease in students caused by the change of location.

After the union of the APCA and the Church of the Nazarene at Chicago in October 1907, to form the Pentecostal Church of the Nazarene, PCI was endorsed by the new denomination. But it received no additional financial support. Within a year three other Nazarene institutions of higher education had been founded that also needed financial assistance. Angell and his successors struggled to raise the necessary funds. To help needy students pay their way, in 1908 Angell decided to start a separate industrial education program at PCI under the name of the Pentecostal Trade Schools. It was incorporated separately in 1911 by the state legislature, at a time when industrial schools were encouraged to meet labor demands of new industries.

By 1910 PCI had purchased machinery for making brooms, sewing and printing, in order to enable students to earn their way in a co-operative work program. To attract more students, PCI soon started commercial and stenographic courses. In 1913 Angell resigned as principal; he suffered from ill health from the stress of running PCI.

=== Martha Curry (1913-1914) ===
Rev. Martha "Mattie" Eva Curry (1867-1948), a nationally known evangelist for the Pentecostal Church of the Nazarene, served as interim principal of PCI for the 1913-1914 school year.

=== J.C. Bearse (1914-1916) ===
From 1914-1916, Rev. Joseph Caldwell Bearse (1869-1931) was principal of PCI. Bearse laid the foundations for the eventual addition of a four-year liberal arts program at PCI, by recruiting well-qualified faculty members. Bearse had attended Brown and Boston universities.

In 1914 Olive Winchester, the first woman to graduate with a Bachelor of Divinity degree from Glasgow University, and the first woman ordained by any Christian denomination in Scotland, returned to PCI to be the head of the Theology department. She was appointed vice-principal. Bertha Munro, who was head of the academy, was an honor graduate of Brown University. She started graduate studies at Radcliffe College. Stephen S. White (1890-1971) was attending graduate classes at Brown.

PCI continued to struggle financially. Bearse wrote: "If we only could have fires to keep us warm, and food to eat that was paid for, it would seem almost like heaven. . . . The struggle to meet our bills is a real test of blood and nerve."

=== A.R. Archibald (1916-1917) ===
Dr. Albert R. Archibald, S.T.D. (1855- ) an ordained Methodist clergyman, and graduate of Boston University, served as interim principal for the 1916-1917 academic year. Winchester resigned in 1916, and moved to Berkeley, California to continue her studies at the Pacific School of Religion.

=== J.E.L. Moore (1917-1919) ===
In 1917 Rev. John Edgar Littleton Moore (1883-1935) was appointed as principal of PCI, with the immediate challenge of ameliorating the college's debt. An estimated $50,000 was needed to erase the debt and equip PCI for college work. Moore was successful in raising the required funds before December 1918. While principal at PCI, Moore also completed graduate work for a master's degree at Boston University. In 1918 the Board of Trustees voted to make Moore president of the college, commence the full four-year college course, and to change the institution's name to Eastern Nazarene College.

== Eastern Nazarene College moves ==
In 1918 the Board of Trustees voted to relocate the college to its present location in Wollaston, Massachusetts. In 1919 Moore resigned to become president of Olivet Nazarene University, then located at Olivet, Illinois.

=== Fred J. Shields (1919) ===
In 1919 the Board of Trustees voted to elect Fred J. Shields (1880-1953) a graduate of Pasadena University, as president. He served for one year.

== Later years ==
=== Watchman Industrial School and Camp (1923–1974) ===
In 1920, the campus was sold to Rev. William S. Holland (1866 -1958), who had founded the Watchman Industrial School in Providence in 1908. He served primarily African-American students. He moved his school to the former PCI campus. There he operated it from 1923 until its bankruptcy in 1938, during the Great Depression. He and his wife continued to operate a summer camp here from African-American youths until 1974.

Over the years, the school for black youths struggled financially. There were suspicious fires in 1924 and 1926, which newspapers reported as likely set by the local Ku Klux Klan. A former student also remembered seeing a cross burned on the lawn in the 1930s. In this period, the Klan was primarily opposed to immigrants.

In the late 1970s, local people led an effort to repair and restore the structures. The complex was listed on the National Register of Historic Places in 1978.

=== Scituate Commons (1983 to current) ===
Since 1983 the building has been used as Scituate Commons, an apartment complex. While the interior has been altered significantly for residential use, the exterior remains true to the original design. In 1985 the site was identified as a state historic site related to African-American history.

== Sources ==
- Angell, E.E. "The Pentecostal Collegiate Institute", The Nazarene Messenger 12 (1907).
- Cameron, James R. Eastern Nazarene College: The First Fifty Years, 1900-1950. Kansas City, MO: Nazarene Publishing House, 1968.
- Chapman, J.B. A History of the Church of the Nazarene. Kansas City, MO: Nazarene, 1926.
- Cunningham, Floyd T., ed. Our Watchword and Song: The Centennial History of the Church of the Nazarene. Beacon Hill Press of Kansas City, 2009. ISBN 0-8341-2444-0\
- Ingersol, Stan. "Why These Schools? Historical Perspectives on Nazarene Higher Education". , Premier Studios, no date
- Leonard, William Ellery. The Locomotive-God. 2nd ed. The Century Company, 1927.
- Parker, J. Fred. Mission to the World: A History of Missions in the Church of the Nazarene Through 1985. Kansas City, MO: Nazarene Publishing House, 1988.
- Price, J. Matthew. "Liberal Arts and the Priorities of Nazarene Higher Education", Didache: Faithful Teaching 2:1 (June 2002).
- Purkiser, Westlake T. Called Unto Holiness. Vol. 2: The Second Twenty-Five Years, 1933-1958. Kansas City, MO: Nazarene, 1983.
- Redford, M.E. The Rise of the Church of the Nazarene. 3rd ed. Kansas City, MO: Beacon Hill Press of Kansas City, 1974.
- Scituate, Rhode Island. Arcadia Publishing, 1998.
- Smith, Timothy L. Called Unto Holiness: Volume One: The Story of the Nazarenes: The Formative Years. Nazarene Publishing House, 1962.
- Tracy, Olive Gertrude. Tracy Sahib of India. Kansas City, MO: Nazarene Publishing House, 1954, reprint 1990.
