= Old Congregational Church (North Scituate, Rhode Island) =

Historic church in Rhode Island, United States

- U.S. National Register of Historic Places
- U.S. Historic district – Contributing property
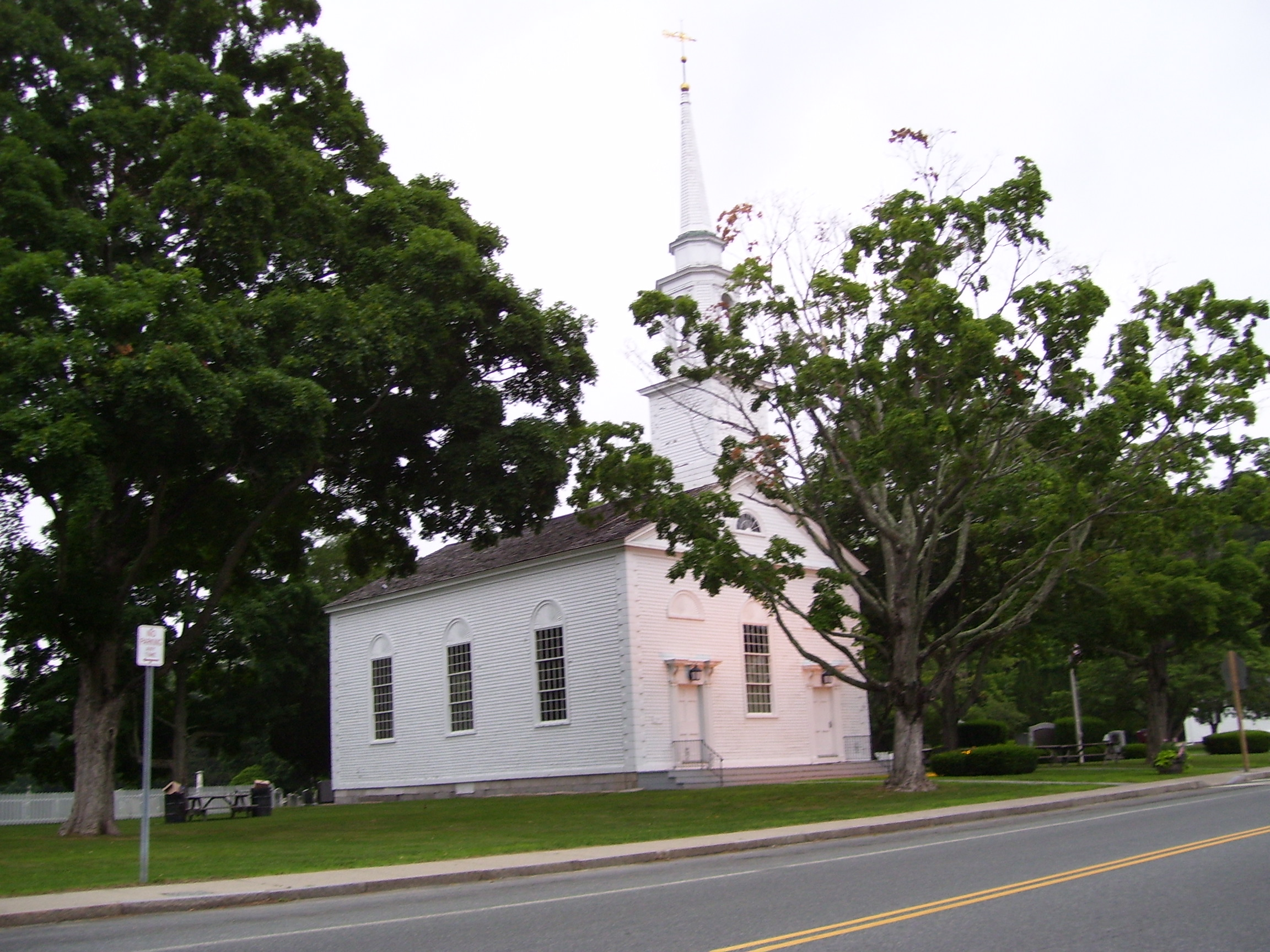
- Old Congregational Church in 2008

- Location within Rhode Island Location within the United States
- Location: North Scituate, Rhode Island
- Coordinates: 41°50′3″N 71°35′14″W
- Built: 1831
- Architect: Clark Sayles
- Architectural style: Greek Revival
- Part of: Smithville-North Scituate (ID79000003)
- NRHP reference No.: 74000002

Significant dates
- Added to NRHP: January 11, 1974
- Designated CP: August 29, 1979

The Old Congregational Church is an historic church building on Greenville Road (Rhode Island Route 116) in the Smithville-North Scituate village of Scituate, Rhode Island. The wood-frame shingled church was designed by Clark Sayles (a protege of noted church-builder Elias Carter) and complete in 1831. The church was regularly used in the 19th century, but attendance declined in the later years, and it was only occasional used until 1940, when it was given to the town. In 1974, the building was listed on National Register of Historic Places.

The Scituate Art Festival has been held on the church grounds every autumn since 1967. The art festival was founded to raise funds to restore the church interior.

== See also ==
- National Register of Historic Places listings in Providence County, Rhode Island
