= North Scituate, Rhode Island =

- Smithville North Scituate
- U.S. National Register of Historic Places
- U.S. Historic district
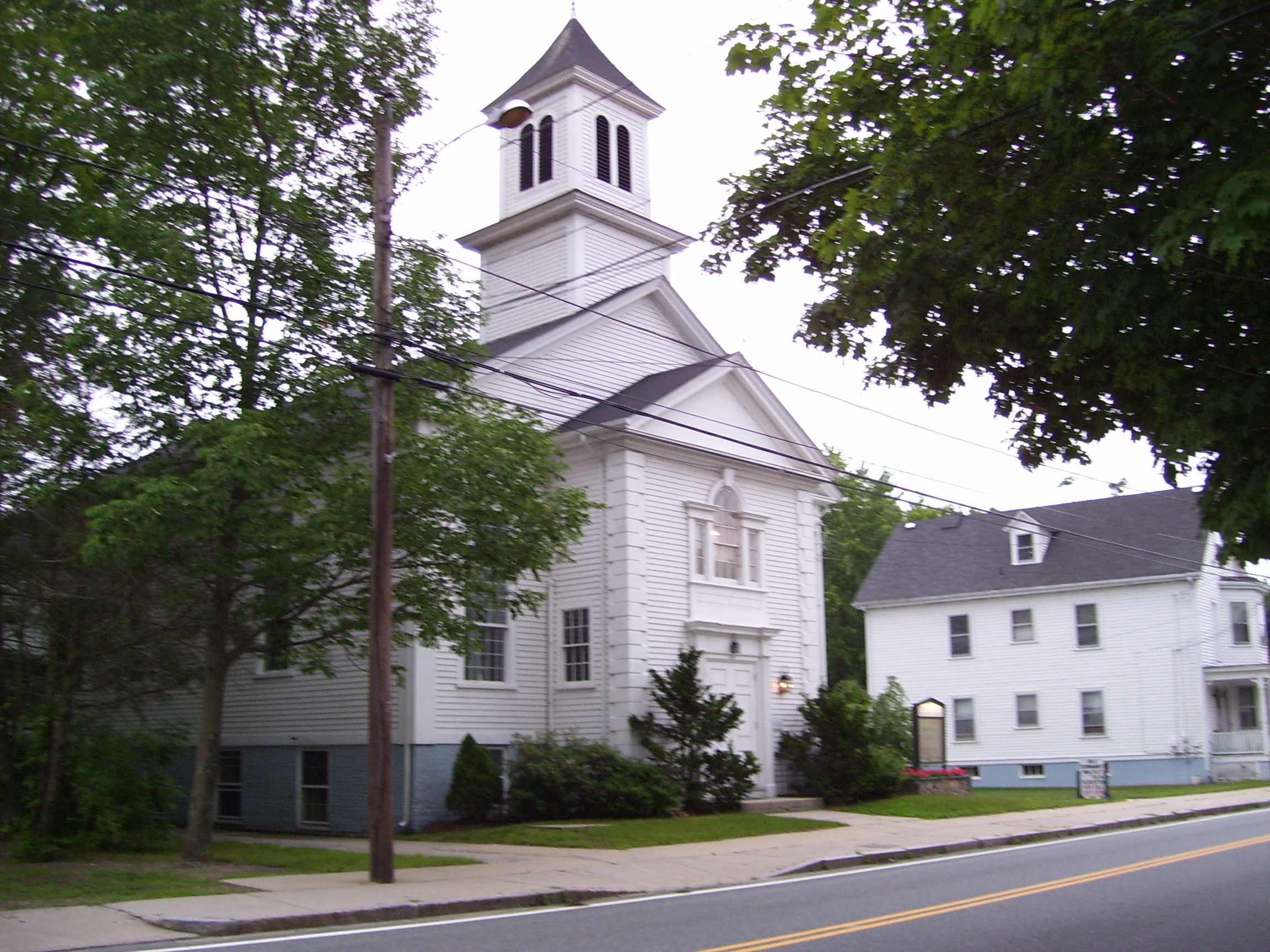
- North Scituate Baptist Church in 2008

- Location within Rhode Island Location within the United States
- Location: Scituate, Rhode Island
- Coordinates: 41.834°N 71.586°W
- Architectural style: Late 19th And 20th Century Revivals, Late Victorian
- NRHP reference No.: 79000003
- Added to NRHP: August 29, 1979

North Scituate is a village in the town of Scituate, Rhode Island, United States. Since 1967, the village has been home to the Scituate Art Festival.

Much of the community is included in a historic district on the Danielson Pike and West Greenville Road. The district contains many nineteenth-century buildings, including the Old Congregational Church (1834) and Smithville Seminary (1839). The district was added to the National Register of Historic Places in 1979.

The zip code for the village is 02857. The zip code is assigned to the name "North Scituate". The zip code also extends into Glocester to the north.

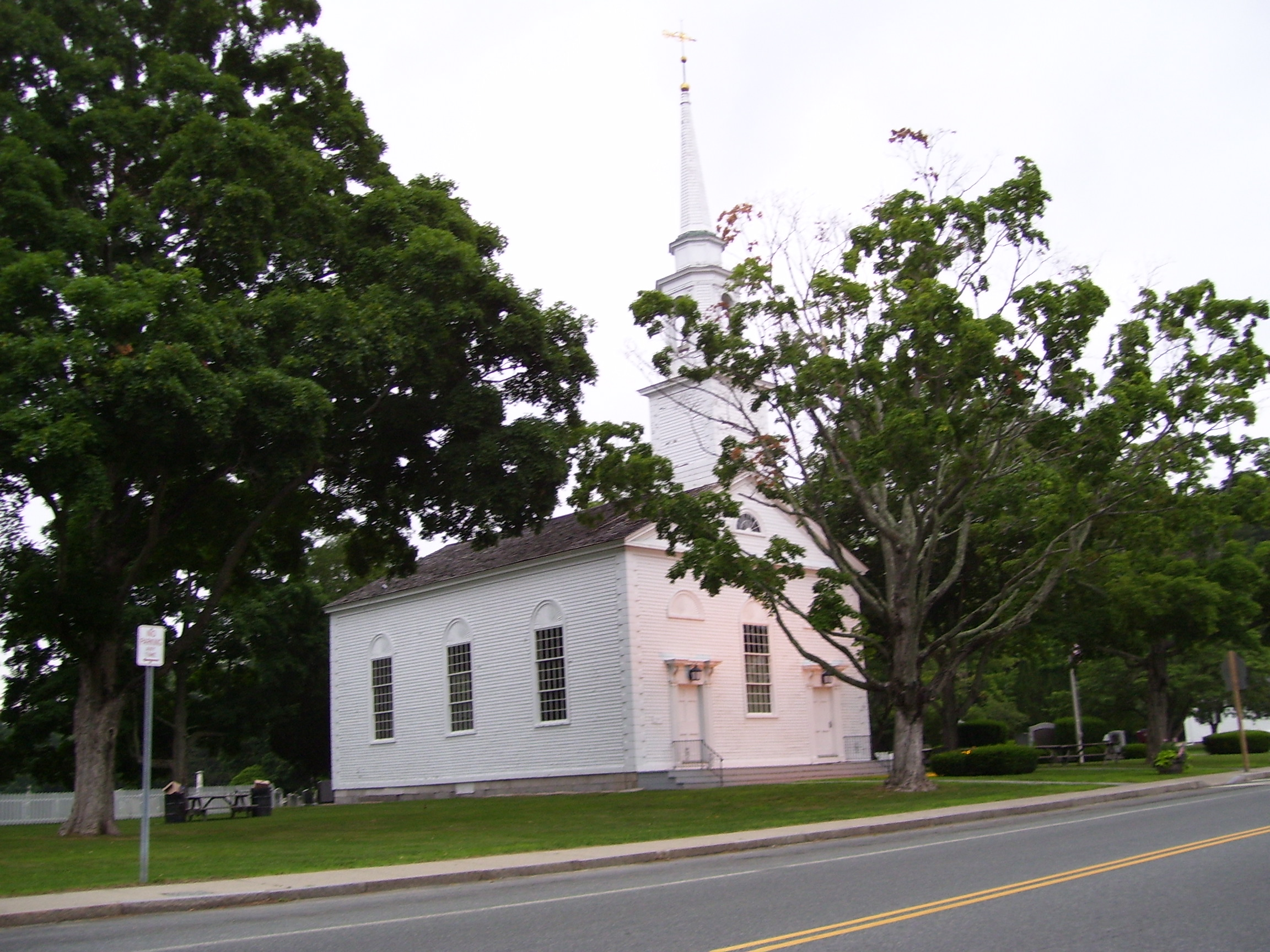
Old Congregational Church, built in 1834

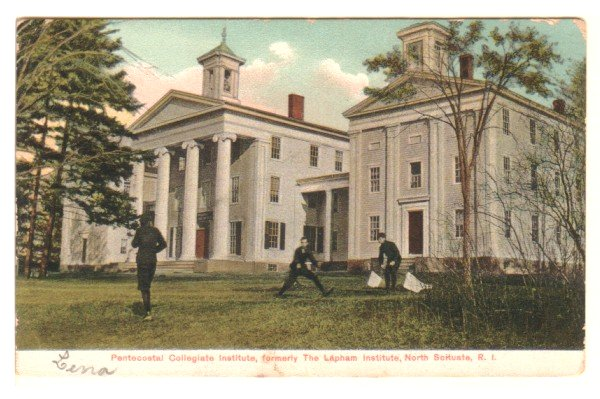
Pentecostal Collegiate Institute on the site of the former Smithville Seminary built in 1839

== See also ==
- National Register of Historic Places listings in Providence County, Rhode Island
- Seagrave Memorial Observatory
