= Quinby =

Quinby may refer to:

== People ==
- Charles Quinby (1899–1988), U.S. Olympic swimmer
- Edwin J. Quinby (1895–1981), publicist, inventor, historian, and activist
- Ephraim Quinby (1766–1850), founder of Warren, Ohio
- H. Anna Quinby (1871-1931), lawyer, editor, business manager, social reformer
- Henry B. Quinby (1846–1924), 52nd Governor of New Hampshire
- Isaac Ferdinand Quinby (1821–1891), American Civil War General
- Ivory Quinby (1817–1869), Mayor of Monmouth, Illinois, founding father of Monmouth College
- James M. Quinby (1804–1874), Mayor of Newark, New Jersey, 1851–1854
- James Moses Quinby (1804–1874), American businessman, 10th mayor of Newark, New Jersey
- John Alonzo Quinby (c. 1819-?), 13th mayor of San Jose, California
- Moses Quinby (1810–1875), early American beekeeper
- Moses Quinby (1786–1857), lawyer and subject of a well-known John Brewster, Jr. portrait
- William E. Quinby (1835–1908), newspaper publisher and U.S. Ambassador to the Netherlands

== Places in the United States ==
- Quinby, Kansas, an unincorporated community
- Quinby, South Carolina, a town
- Quinby, Virginia, a census-designated place

== Other uses ==
- J.M. Quinby & Co., early automobile and carriage manufacturer
  - Quinby (automobile), an American automobile manufactured in 1899
- Vega Company, originally named Quinby & Hall

== See also ==
- Ivory Quinby House, Illinois
- Quimby (disambiguation)
