= Quimby =

Quimby may refer to:

- Quimby (surname), a list of people and fictional characters
- Quimby, Iowa, a small city in the United States
- Quimby Island, in the Sacramento–San Joaquin River Delta, California, United States
- Quimby (band), a Hungarian alternative rock band
- the title character of Quimby the Mouse, a comic strip created by Chris Ware
- Quimby Pipe Organs, an American company founded in 1970
- Quimby College, former name of Southwestern College (New Mexico), also Quimby Metaphysical Library and Quimby Memorial Library

== See also ==
- Quimby House (disambiguation)
- Quinby (disambiguation)
