= Union (American Civil War) =

US federal government from 1861 to 1865

United States of America
- 1861–1865
- Top: Flag (1861–1863) Coat of arms
- Motto: E pluribus unum (Latin) "Out of many, one"
- Anthem: "Hail, Columbia" (de facto) "My Country, 'Tis of Thee" (de facto)
- Free states Loyal slave states (Note: Kentucky and Missouri had competing Confederate governments.) Secessionist states U.S. territories and Indian Territory
- Status: Recognized government of the United States
- Capital: Washington, D.C. 38°53′N 77°1′W
- Largest city: New York City 40°43′N 74°0′W
- Government: Federal presidential republic
- President
  - 1861–1865: Abraham Lincoln
  - 1865: Andrew Johnson
- Speaker of the House
  - 1861–63: Galusha A. Grow
  - 1863–65: Schuyler Colfax
- Chief Justice
  - 1861–64: Roger B. Taney
  - 1864–65: Salmon P. Chase
- Legislature: Congress
  - Upper house: Senate
  - Lower house: House of Representatives
- Historical era: American Civil War
  - Confederate secession: December 20, 1860–May 20, 1861
  - Battle of Fort Sumter: April 12–13, 1861
  - Confederate surrender: April 9–November 6, 1865
- Currency: United States dollar
- Today part of: United States

The Union is a term used to refer to the federal government and loyal states of the United States during the American Civil War. Its military forces and civilian population resisted the secession of the Southern slave states that formed the Confederate States of America following the 1860 election of Abraham Lincoln as president of the United States. Lincoln's administration asserted the permanency of the federal government and the continuity of the United States Constitution, and it refused to recognize the Confederate government.

Many Americans in the 19th century commonly used the term "the Union" to mean either the federal government of the United States or the unity of the states within the federal constitutional framework. The Union can also refer to the people or territory of the states that remained loyal to the national government during the war. The loyal states located mostly north of the Mason–Dixon line were also known as the "North", although four southern border states and West Virginia, when it became a state during the war, remained loyal to the Union, and many Black Southerners (both free and enslaved) and Southern Unionists opposed secession and supported the Union war effort.

The Northeast and Midwest provided the industrial resources for a mechanized war, producing large quantities of munitions and supplies and financing the war. They also provided a vast majority of the Union Army soldiers, food, horses, financial support, and training camps. Army hospitals and prison camps were also set up across the Union. Most Northern states had Republican governors who supported the war effort and suppressed anti-war subversion. The Democratic Party supported the war at the beginning in 1861, but by 1862 it split into the War Democrats and the anti-war element known as Peace Democrats, led by the "Copperheads". The Democrats made major electoral gains in 1862 in state elections, most notably in New York. They lost ground in 1863, especially in Ohio. In 1864, the Republicans and War Democrats joined to campaign under the National Union Party banner, which also attracted most soldiers, and scored a landslide victory for Lincoln and his entire ticket against Democratic candidate George B. McClellan.

The war years were quite prosperous except where serious fighting and guerrilla warfare ravaged the countryside. Almost all military actions took place in the Confederacy. Prosperity was stimulated by heavy government spending and the creation of an entirely new national banking system. The Union states invested a great deal of money and effort in organizing psychological and social support for soldiers' wives, widows, and orphans, and for the soldiers themselves. Most soldiers were volunteers, although after 1862 many volunteered in order to escape the draft and to take advantage of generous cash bounties offered by states and localities. Draft resistance was notable in some larger cities, especially in parts of New York City, which had massive anti-draft riots in July 1863, and in some remote districts such as the Coal Region of Northeastern Pennsylvania.

== Etymology ==
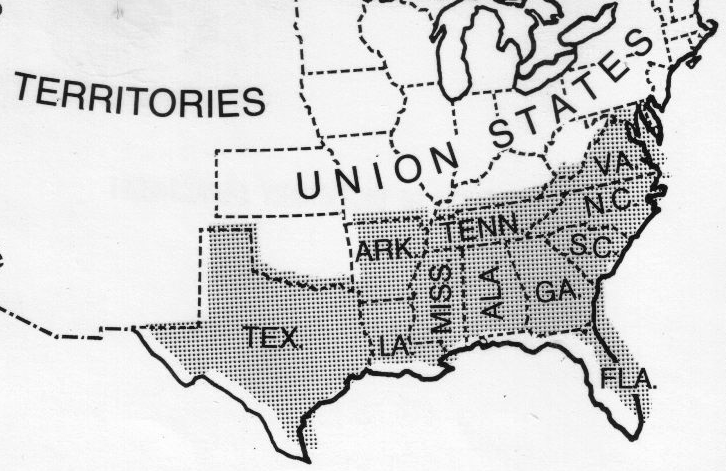
The division of Union and Confederate states during the American Civil War, which lasted from 1861 to 1865

In the context of the American Civil War, the Union, or the United States, is sometimes referred to as "the North", both then and now, while the Confederacy was often called "the South".

The term "Union" occurs in the first governing document of the United States, the Articles of Confederation and Perpetual Union. The subsequent United States Constitution of 1787 was issued and ratified in the name not of the states, but of "We the People of the United States, in Order to form a more perfect Union ...." Union, for the United States of America, is then repeated in such clauses as the Admission to the Union clause in Article IV, Section 3. Even before the Civil War began the phrase "preserve the Union" was commonplace, and a "union of states" had been used to refer to the entire United States of America. Using the term "Union" to apply to the non-secessionist side carried a connotation of legitimacy as the continuation of the pre-existing political entity. Before the American Civil War, the United States was known as the "United States' federal union", a union of states controlled by the federal government in Washington, D.C. This was opposite to the CSA's first government, a confederation of independent states, functioning similarly to the European Union. Confederates sometimes viewed the Union as being abolitionist, referring to the U.S. Navy as the "abolition fleet" and the U.S. Army as "abolition forces".

In 2015, historian Michael Landis called for an end to the use of the term "Union", writing, "The employment of 'Union' instead of 'United States,' implicitly supports the Confederate view of secession wherein the nation of the United States collapsed.... In reality, however, the United States never ceased to exist.... The dichotomy of 'Union v. Confederacy' lends credibility to the Confederate experiment and undermines the legitimacy of the United States as a political entity." In 2021, the Army University Press noted that it was replacing "Union" with "Federal Government" or "U.S. Government", because this was "more historically accurate", as "the term 'Union' always referred to all the states together."

== Size and strength ==
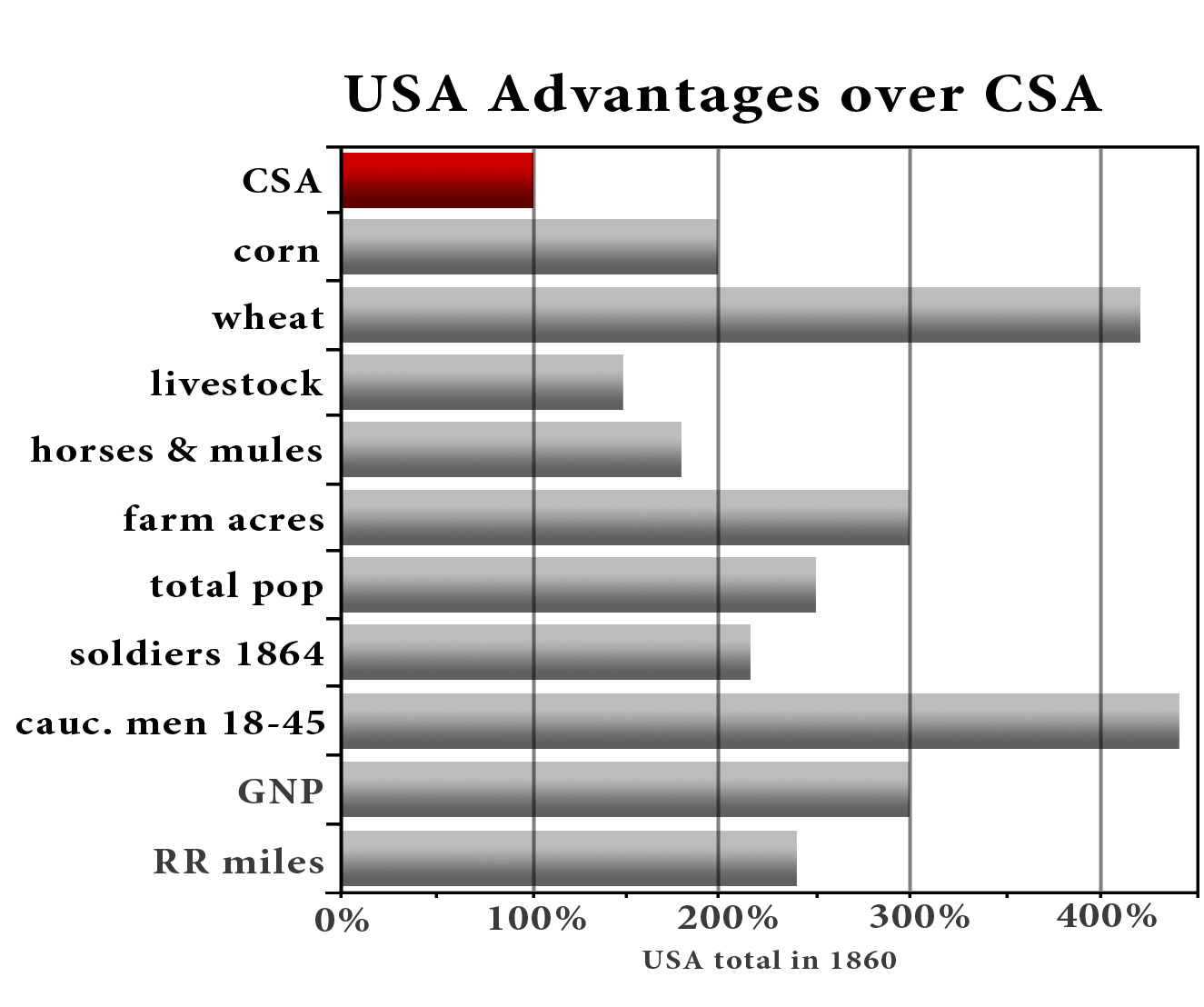
The Union had large advantages in men and resources at the start of the war, and the ratio grew steadily in its favor as the war progressed. In the chart, "cauc men" means white men (Caucasian).

Compared to the Confederacy, the loyal states were more industrialized and urbanized and possessed more advanced commercial, transportation, and financial systems. Additionally, the Union states had a manpower advantage of five to two at the start of the war.

Year by year, the Confederacy shrank and lost control of increasing quantities of resources and population. Meanwhile, the United States turned its growing advantage into a much stronger military force. However, much of the US strength had to be used to garrison former Confederate areas and to protect railroads and other vital points. The loyal states' great advantages in population and industry would prove to be vital long-term factors in its victory over the Confederacy, but it took time for the Union to fully mobilize these resources.

== Public opinion ==
The attack on Fort Sumter rallied the free states to the defense of American nationalism. In 1959, Columbia University historian Allan Nevins wrote:

The thunderclap of Sumter produced a startling crystallization of Northern sentiment.... Anger swept the land. From every side came news of mass meetings, speeches, resolutions, tenders of business support, the muster of companies and regiments, the determined action of governors and legislatures.

Russell McClintock states:

At the time, Northerners were right to wonder at the near unanimity that so quickly followed long months of bitterness and discord. It would not last throughout the protracted war to come—or even through the year—but in that moment of unity was laid bare the common Northern nationalism usually hidden by the fierce battles more typical of the political arena."

As the war continued, Northern voters increasingly feared the centralization of power in Washington, extravagant spending, and war profiteering—anxieties that Democratic candidates heavily capitalized on during wartime elections. Democratic candidates added that rapid modernization was putting too much political power in the hands of Eastern financiers and industrialists. They warned that the abolition of slavery would bring a flood of freed black people into the labor market of the free states.

Republicans responded with charges of defeatism. They indicted Copperheads for criminal conspiracies to free Confederate prisoners of war and played on the spirit of nationalism and the growing hatred of the slave owners, as the guilty party in the war.

== President Lincoln ==
Historians have overwhelmingly praised the "political genius" of Abraham Lincoln's performance as president. His first priority was military victory. This required that he master entirely new skills as a strategist and diplomat. He oversaw supplies, finances, manpower, the selection of generals, and the course of overall strategy. Working closely with state and local politicians, he rallied public opinion and (at Gettysburg) articulated a national mission that has defined America ever since. Lincoln's charm and willingness to cooperate with political and personal enemies made Washington work much more smoothly than Richmond, the Confederate capital, and his wit smoothed many rough edges. Lincoln's cabinet proved much stronger and more efficient than Davis's, as Lincoln channeled personal rivalries into a competition for excellence rather than mutual destruction. With William Seward at State, Salmon P. Chase at the Treasury, and (from 1862) Edwin Stanton at the War Department, Lincoln had a powerful cabinet of determined men. Except for monitoring major appointments and decisions, Lincoln gave them free rein to end the Confederate rebellion.

== Congress ==
The Republican Congress passed many major laws that reshaped the nation's economy, financial system, tax system, land system, and higher education system. These included the Morrill tariff, the Homestead Act, the Pacific Railroad Act, and the National Banking Act. Lincoln paid relatively little attention to this legislation as he focused on war issues, but he worked smoothly with congressional leaders such as Thaddeus Stevens (on taxation and spending), Charles Sumner (on foreign affairs), Lyman Trumbull (on legal issues), Justin Smith Morrill (on land grants and tariffs) and William Pitt Fessenden (on finances).

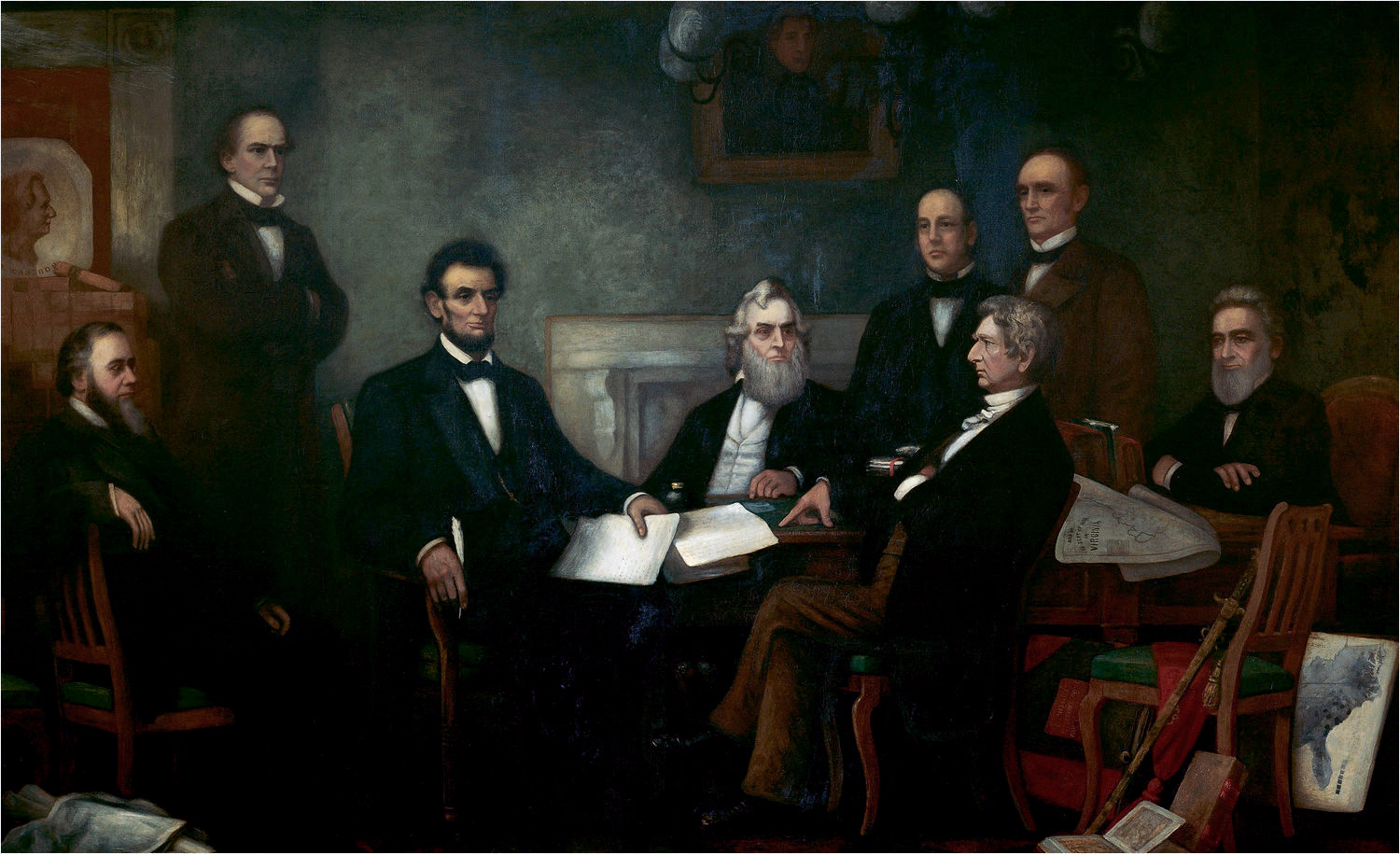
Lincoln met with his Cabinet for the first reading of the Emancipation Proclamation draft on July 22, 1862.

Military and reconstruction issues were another matter. Lincoln, as the leader of the moderate and conservative factions of the Republican Party, often crossed swords with the Radical Republicans, led by Stevens and Sumner. Historian Bruce Tap shows that Congress challenged Lincoln's role as commander-in-chief through the Joint Committee on the Conduct of the War. It was a joint committee of both houses that was dominated by the Radical Republicans, who took a hard line against the Confederacy. During the 37th and 38th Congresses, the committee investigated every aspect of Union military operations, giving special attention to finding commanders culpable for military defeats. It assumed an inevitable Union victory. Failure was perceived to indicate evil motivations or personal failures. The committee distrusted graduates of West Point, since many of the academy's alumni were leaders of the enemy army. Members of the committee much preferred political generals with a satisfactory political record. Some of the committee suggested that West-Pointers who engaged in strategic maneuver were cowardly or even disloyal. It ended up endorsing incompetent but politically acceptable generals.

=== Opposition ===
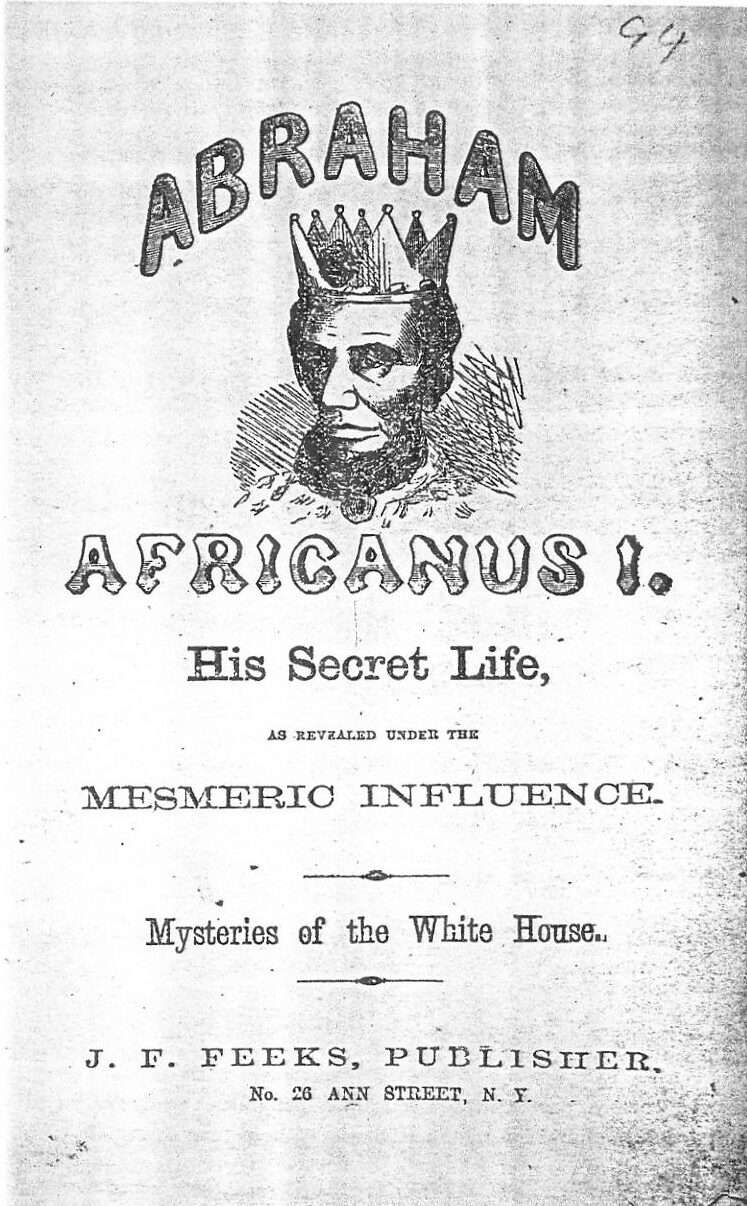
An anti-Lincoln Copperhead Democrats pamphlet from 1864

The opposition came from Copperhead Democrats, who were strongest in the Midwest and wanted to allow Confederate secession. In the East, opposition to the war was strongest among Irish Catholics, but also included business interests connected to the slave states typified by August Belmont. The Democratic Party was deeply split. In 1861 most Democrats supported the war. However, the party increasingly split down the middle between the moderates who supported the war effort, and the peace element, including Copperheads, who did not. It scored major gains in the 1862 elections, and elected the moderate Horatio Seymour as governor of New York. They gained 28 seats in the House of Representatives, including the Speaker of the House's seat but Republicans retained control of both the House and the Senate.

The 1862 election for the Indiana legislature was especially hard-fought. Though the Democrats gained control of the legislature, they were unable to impede the war effort. Republican Governor Oliver P. Morton was able to maintain control of the state's contribution to the war effort despite the Democratic majority. Washington was especially helpful in 1864 in arranging furloughs to allow Hoosier soldiers to return home so they could vote in elections. Across the North in 1864, the great majority of soldiers voted Republican or National Union. Men who had been Democrats before the war often abstained or voted Republican.

As the federal draft laws tightened, there was serious unrest among Copperhead strongholds, such as the Irish in the Pennsylvania coal mining districts. The government needed the coal more than the draftees, so it ignored the largely non-violent draft dodging there. The violent New York City draft riots of 1863 were suppressed by the U.S. Army firing grape shot down cobblestone city streets.

The Democrats nominated George McClellan, a War Democrat for the 1864 presidential but imposed an anti-war platform on him. In terms of Congress the opposition against the war was nearly powerless—as was the case in most states. In Indiana and Illinois pro-war governors circumvented anti-war legislatures elected in 1862. For 30 years after the war the Democrats carried the burden of having opposed the martyred Lincoln, who was viewed by many as the salvation of the Union and the destroyer of slavery.

==== Copperheads ====
The Copperheads were a large faction of Northern Democrats who opposed the war, demanding an immediate peace settlement. They said they wanted to restore "the Union as it was," that is with the South and with slavery. The most prominent Copperhead was Ohio's Clement L. Vallandigham, a congressman and leader of the Democratic Party in Ohio. He was defeated in an election for governor in 1863. Republican prosecutors in the Midwest accused some Copperhead activists of treason in a series of trials in 1864.

Copperheadism was a grassroots movement, strongest in the area just north of the Ohio River, as well as in some urban ethnic wards. Some historians have argued that it represented a traditionalistic element alarmed at the rapid modernization of society sponsored by the Republican Party. It looked back to Jacksonian Democracy for inspiration—with ideals that promoted an agrarian rather than an industrialized concept of society. Weber (2006) argues that the Copperheads damaged the Union war effort by fighting the draft, encouraging desertion and forming conspiracies. However, other historians say the Copperheads were a legitimate opposition force unfairly treated by the government, adding that the draft was in disrepute and that the Republicans greatly exaggerated the conspiracies for partisan reasons. Copperheadism was a major issue in the 1864 presidential election—its strength waxed when Union armies were doing poorly and waned when they won great victories. After the fall of Atlanta in September 1864, military success seemed assured and Copperheadism collapsed.

== Soldiers ==
=== Recruiting volunteers ===
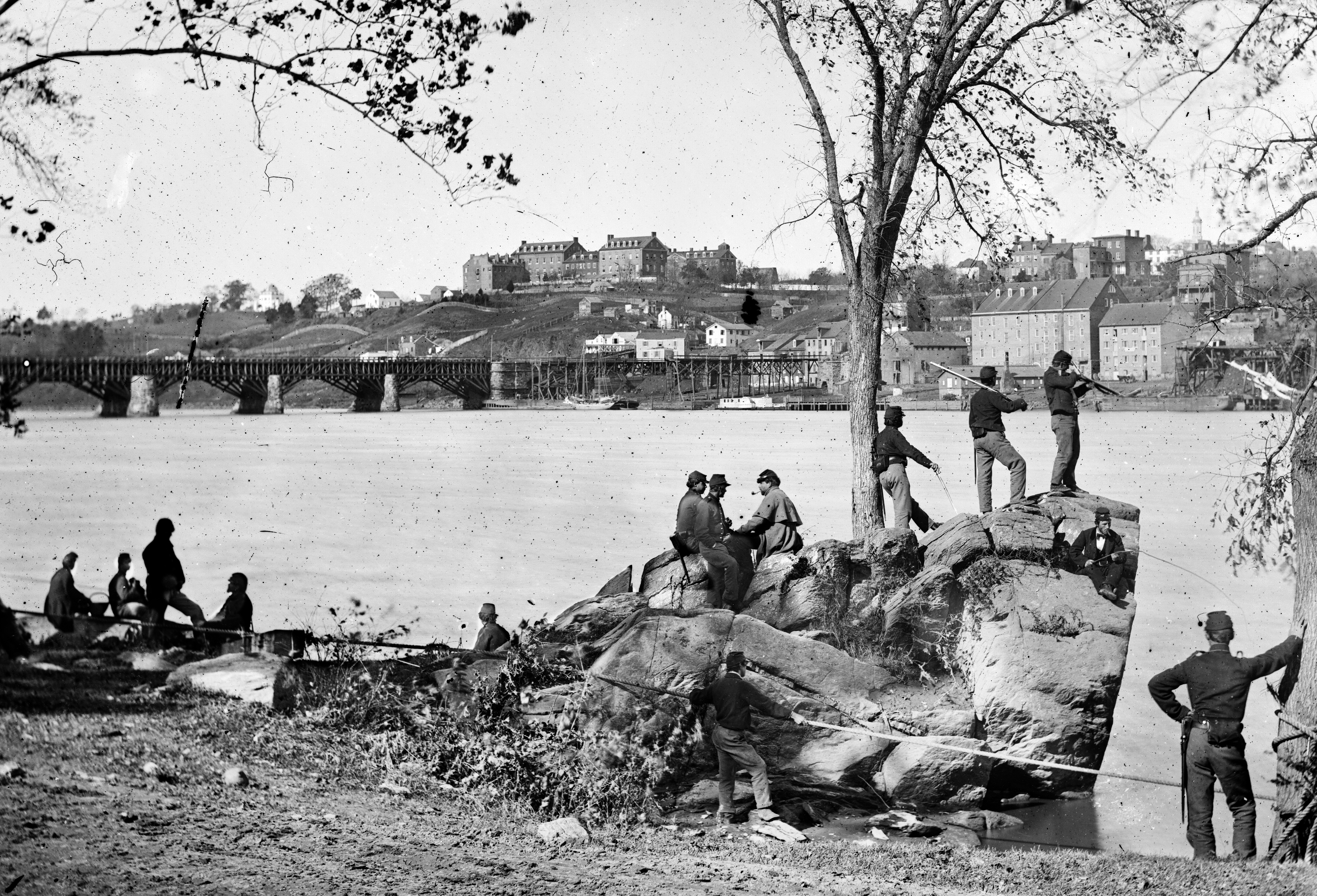
Union soldiers on Mason's Island, later renamed Theodore Roosevelt Island, on the Potomac River in 1861

Enthusiastic young men clamored to join the Union army in 1861. They came with family support for reasons of patriotism and excitement. Washington decided to keep the small regular army intact; it had only 16,000 men and was needed to guard the frontier. Its officers could, however, join the temporary new volunteer army that was formed, with expectations that their experience would lead to rapid promotions. The problem with volunteering, however, was its serious lack of planning, leadership, and organization at the highest levels. Washington called on the states for troops, and every free state governor set about raising and equipping regiments, and sent the bills to the War Department. The men could elect the junior officers, while the governor appointed the senior officers, and Lincoln appointed the generals. Typically, politicians used their local organizations to raise troops and were in line (if healthy enough) to become colonel. The problem was that the War Department, under the disorganized leadership of Simon Cameron, also authorized local and private groups to raise regiments. The result was widespread confusion and delay.

Pennsylvania, for example, had acute problems. When Washington called for 10 more regiments, enough men volunteered to form 30. However, they were scattered among 70 different new units, none of them a complete regiment. Not until Washington approved gubernatorial control of all new units was the problem resolved. Allan Nevins is particularly scathing of this in his analysis: "A President more exact, systematic and vigilant than Lincoln, a Secretary more alert and clearheaded than Cameron, would have prevented these difficulties."

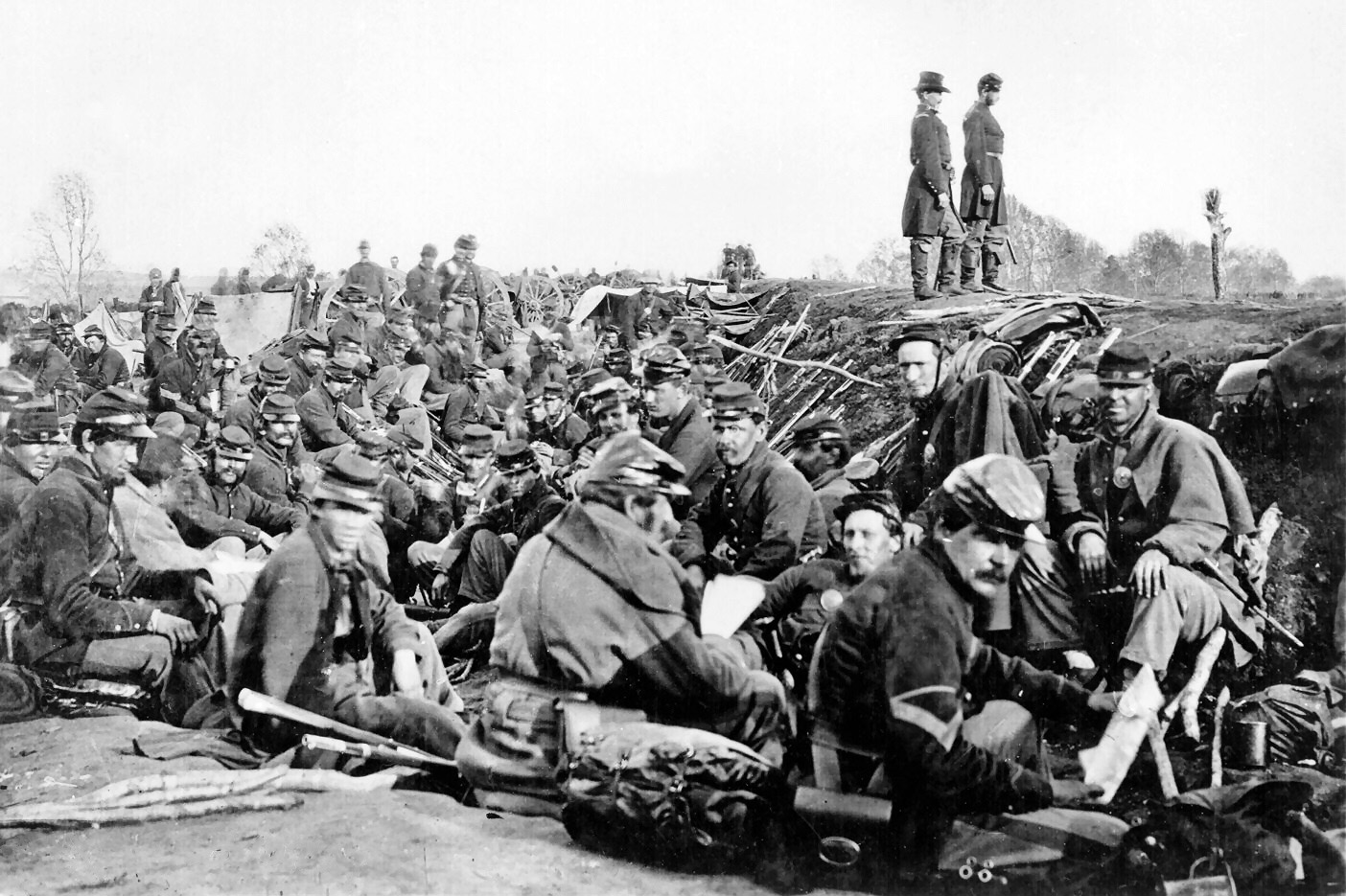
Union soldiers Marye's Heights during the Second Battle of Fredericksburg in May 1863

By the end of 1861, 700,000 soldiers were drilling in Union camps. The first wave in spring was called up for only 90 days, then the soldiers went home or reenlisted. Later waves enlisted for three years.

The new recruits spent their time drilling in company and regiment formations. The combat in the first year, though strategically important, involved relatively small forces and few casualties. Sickness was a much more serious cause of hospitalization or death.

In the first few months, men wore low quality uniforms made of "shoddy" material, but by fall, sturdy wool uniforms—in blue—were standard. The nation's factories were converted to produce the rifles, cannons, wagons, tents, telegraph sets, and the myriad of other special items the army needed.

While business had been slow or depressed in spring 1861, because of war fears and Confederate boycotts, by fall business was hiring again, offering young men jobs that were an alternative way to help win the war. Nonpartisanship was the rule in the first year, but by summer 1862, many Democrats had stopped supporting the war effort, and volunteering fell off sharply in their strongholds.

The calls for more and more soldiers continued, so states and localities responded by offering cash bonuses. By 1863, a draft law was in effect, but few men actually were drafted and served, since the law was designed to get them to volunteer or hire a substitute. Others hid away or left the country. With the Emancipation Proclamation taking effect in January 1863, localities could meet their draft quota by sponsoring regiments of ex-slaves organized in the Confederacy.

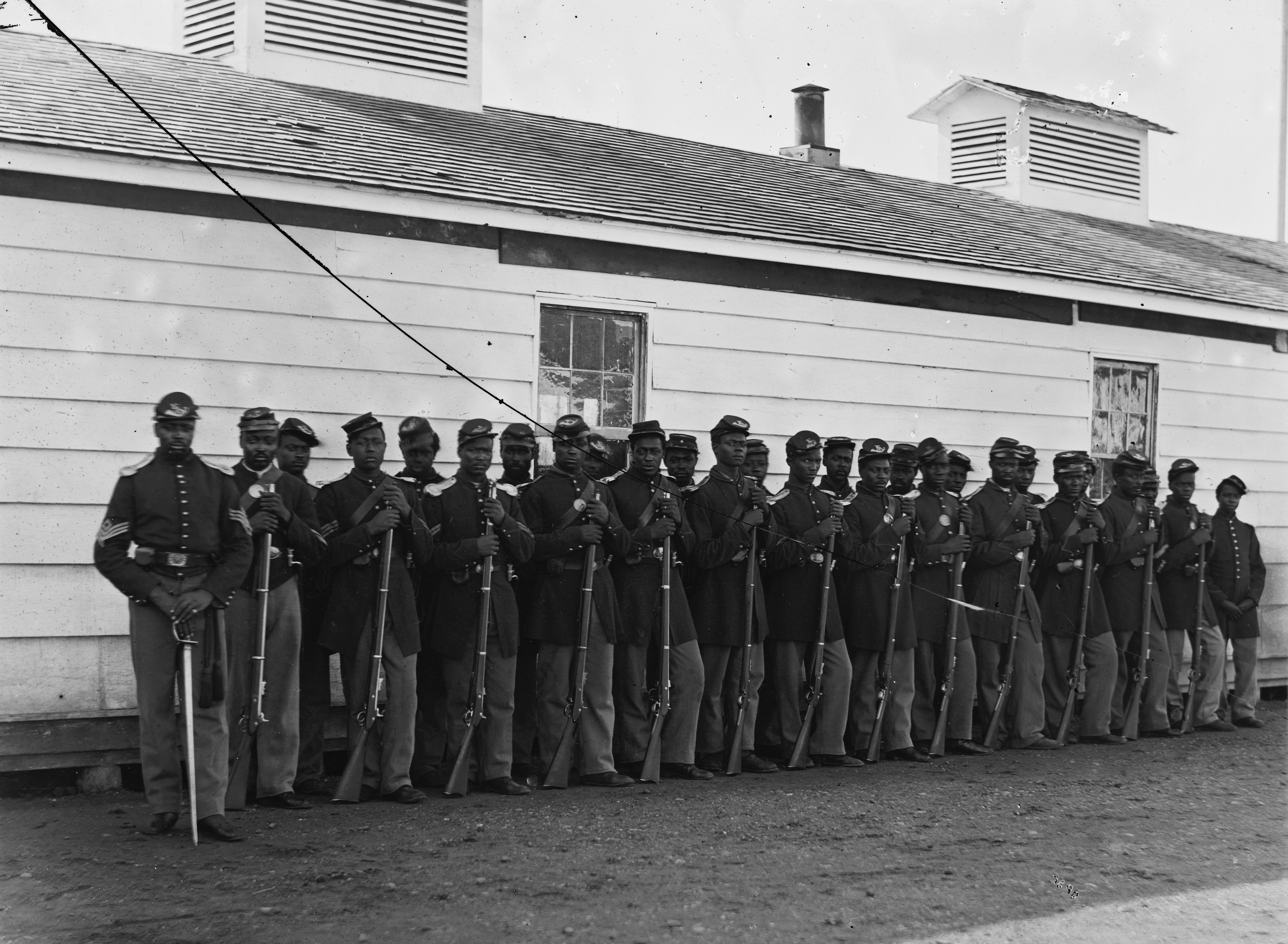
Soldiers from the 4th United States Colored Infantry Regiment at Fort Lincoln, 1865

Michigan was especially eager to send thousands of volunteers. A study of the cities of Grand Rapids and Niles shows an overwhelming surge of nationalism in 1861, whipping up enthusiasm for the war in all segments of society, and all political, religious, ethnic, and occupational groups. However, by 1862 the casualties were mounting, and the war was increasingly focused on freeing the slaves in addition to preserving the Union. Copperhead Democrats called the war a failure, and it became an increasingly partisan Republican effort. Michigan voters remained evenly split between the parties in the presidential election of 1864.

==== Motivations of soldiers ====
Michael Perman (2010) says historians are of two minds on why millions of men seemed so eager to fight, suffer, and die over four years:

Some historians emphasize that Civil War soldiers were driven by political ideology, holding firm beliefs about the importance of liberty, Union, or state rights, or about the need to protect or to destroy slavery. Others point to less overtly political reasons to fight, such as the defense of one's home and family, or the honor and brotherhood to be preserved when fighting alongside other men. Most historians agree that, no matter what he thought about when he went into the war, the experience of combat affected him profoundly and sometimes affected his reasons for continuing to fight.

==== The paperwork war ====
On the whole, the national, state, and local governments handled the avalanche of paperwork effectively. Skills developed in insurance and financial companies formed the basis of systematic forms, copies, summaries, and filing systems used to make sense of masses of human data. The leader in this effort, John Shaw Billings, later developed a system of mechanically storing, sorting, and counting numerical information using punch cards. Nevertheless, old-fashioned methodology had to be recognized and overcome. An illustrative case study came in New Hampshire, where the critical post of state adjutant general was held in 1861–64 by elderly politician Anthony C. Colby (1792–1873) and his son Daniel E. Colby (1816–1891). They were patriotic, but were overwhelmed with the complexity of their duties. The state lost track of men who enlisted after 1861; it had no personnel records or information on volunteers, substitutes, or draftees, and there was no inventory of weaponry and supplies. Nathaniel Head (1828–1883) took over in 1864, obtained an adequate budget and office staff, and reconstructed the missing paperwork. As result, widows, orphans, and disabled veterans received the postwar payments they had earned.

=== Medical conditions ===
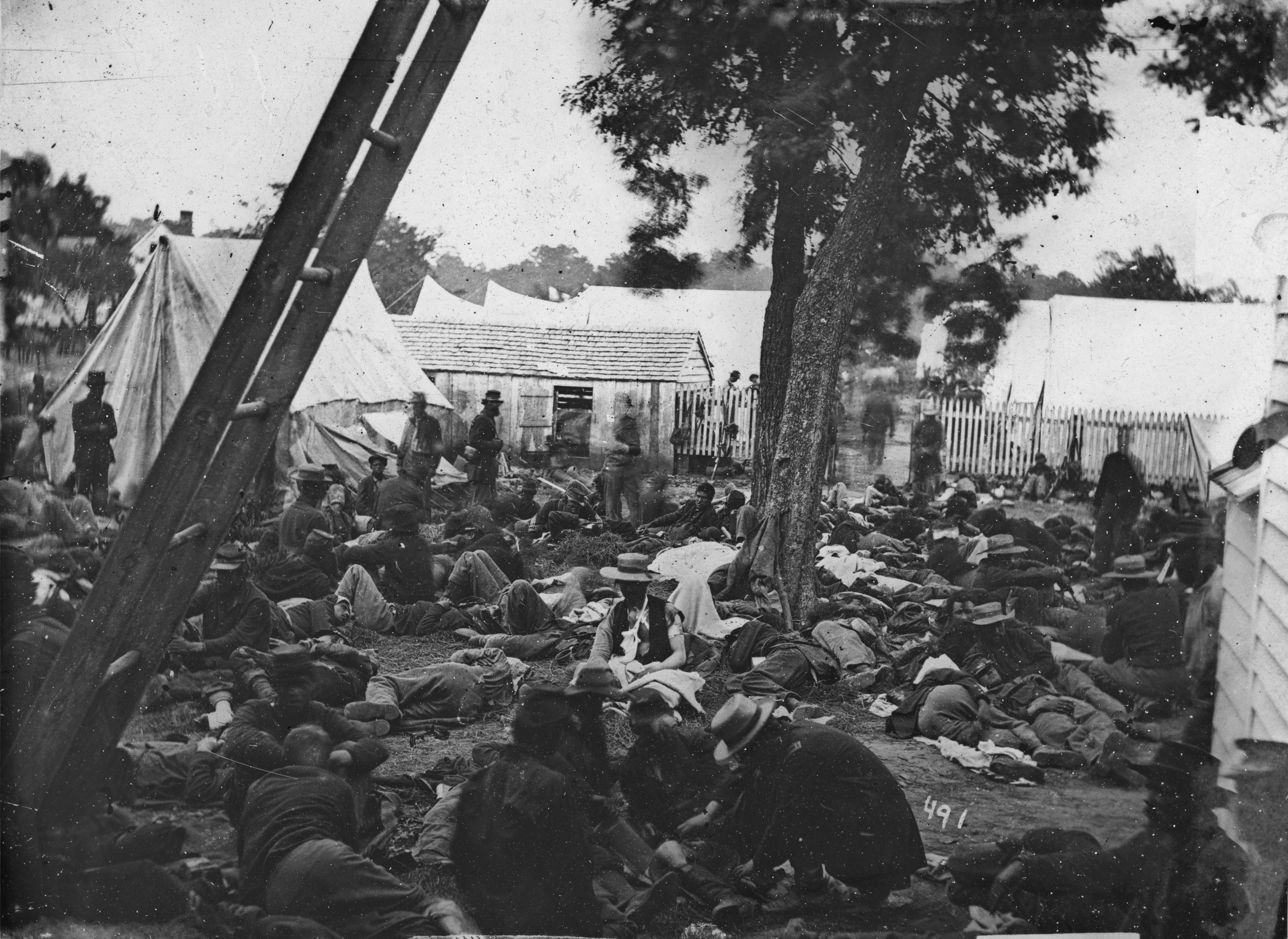
A field hospital following the Battle of Savage's Station in 1862

More soldiers died of disease than from battle injuries, and even larger numbers were temporarily incapacitated by wounds, disease, and accidents. The Union responded by building army hospitals in every state.

The hygiene of the camps was poor, especially at the beginning of the war when men who had seldom been far from home were brought together for training with thousands of strangers. First came epidemics of the childhood diseases of chicken pox, mumps, whooping cough, and especially, measles. Operations in the Confederacy meant a dangerous and new disease environment, bringing diarrhea, dysentery, typhoid fever, and malaria. There were no antibiotics, so the surgeons prescribed coffee, whiskey, and quinine. Harsh weather, bad water, inadequate shelter in winter quarters, poor policing of camps, and dirty camp hospitals took their toll. This was a common scenario in wars from time immemorial, and conditions faced by the Confederate army were even worse. What was different in the Union was the emergence of skilled, well-funded medical organizers who took proactive action, especially in the much enlarged United States Army Medical Department, and the United States Sanitary Commission, a new private agency. Numerous other new agencies also targeted the medical and morale needs of soldiers, including the United States Christian Commission, as well as smaller private agencies, such as the Women's Central Association of Relief for Sick and Wounded in the Army (WCAR), founded in 1861 by Henry Whitney Bellows, a Unitarian minister, and the social reformer Dorothea Dix. Systematic funding appeals raised public consciousness as well as millions of dollars. Many thousands of volunteers worked in the hospitals and rest homes, most famously poet Walt Whitman. Frederick Law Olmsted, a famous landscape architect, was the highly efficient executive director of the Sanitary Commission.

States could use their own tax money to support their troops, as Ohio did. Under the energetic leadership of Governor David Tod, a War Democrat who won office on a coalition "Union Party" ticket with Republicans, Ohio acted vigorously. Following the unexpected carnage at the battle of Shiloh in April 1862, Ohio sent three steamboats to the scene as floating hospitals equipped with doctors, nurses, and medical supplies. The state fleet expanded to 11 hospital ships, and the state set up 12 local offices in main transportation nodes, to help Ohio soldiers moving back and forth.

The Christian Commission comprised 6,000 volunteers who aided chaplains in many ways. For example, its agents distributed Bibles, delivered sermons, helped with sending letters home, taught men to read and write, and set up camp libraries.

The Army learned many lessons and modernized its procedures, and medical science—especially surgery—made many advances. In the long run, the wartime experiences of the numerous Union commissions modernized public welfare, and set the stage for large—scale community philanthropy in America based on fund raising campaigns and private donations.

Additionally, women gained new public roles. For example, Mary Livermore (1820–1905), the manager of the Chicago branch of the US Sanitary Commission, used her newfound organizational skills to mobilize support for women's suffrage after the war. She argued that women needed more education and job opportunities to help them fulfill their role of serving others.

The Sanitary Commission collected enormous amounts of statistical data, and opened up the problems of storing information for fast access and mechanically searching for data patterns. The pioneer was John Shaw Billings (1838–1913). A senior surgeon in the war, Billings built two of the world's most important libraries, Library of the Surgeon General's Office (now the National Library of Medicine) and the New York Public Library; he also figured out how to mechanically analyze data by turning it into numbers and punching onto the computer punch card, later developed by his student Herman Hollerith. Hollerith's company became International Business Machines (IBM) in 1911.

=== Prisoners of war ===
Both sides operated prison camps; they handled about 400,000 captives, but many other prisoners were quickly released and never sent to camps. The Record and Pension Office in 1901 counted 211,000 United States soldiers who were captured. In 1861–63 most were immediately paroled; after the parole exchange system broke down in 1863, about 195,000 went to Confederate prison camps. Some tried to escape but few succeeded. By contrast 464,000 Confederates were captured (many in the final days) and 215,000 imprisoned. Over 30,000 Union and nearly 26,000 Confederate prisoners died in captivity. Just over 12% of the captives in United States prisons died, compared to 15.5% for Confederate prisons.

=== Draft riots ===
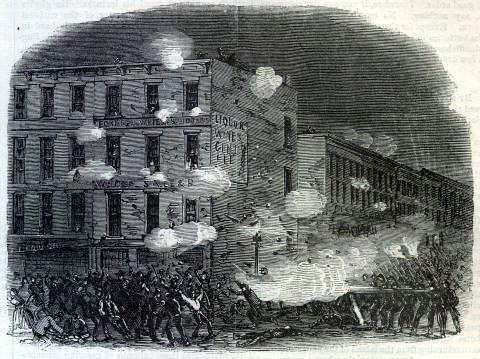
New York City draft riots in 1863

Discontent with the 1863 draft law led to riots in several cities and in rural areas as well. By far the most important were the New York City draft riots of July 13 to July 16, 1863. Irish Catholic and other workers fought police, militia and regular army units until the Army used artillery to sweep the streets. Initially focused on the draft, the protests quickly expanded into violent attacks on blacks in New York City, with many killed on the streets.

Small-scale riots broke out in ethnic German and Irish districts, and in areas along the Ohio River with many Copperheads. Holmes County, Ohio was an isolated parochial area dominated by Pennsylvania Dutch and some recent German immigrants. It was a Democratic stronghold and few men dared speak out in favor of conscription. Local politicians denounced Lincoln and Congress as despotic, seeing the draft law as a violation of their local autonomy. In June 1863, small-scale disturbances broke out; they ended when the Army sent in armed units.

== Economy ==
The Union economy grew and prospered during the war while fielding a very large army and navy. The Republicans in Washington had a Whiggish vision of an industrial nation, with great cities, efficient factories, productive farms, all national banks, all knit together by a modern railroad system, to be mobilized by the United States Military Railroad. The slave states had resisted policies such as tariffs to promote industry and homestead laws to promote farming because slavery would not benefit. With the slave state representatives absent and Northern Democrats weak, the Republicans enacted their legislation. At the same time they passed new taxes to pay for part of the war and issued large amounts of bonds to pay for most of the rest. Economic historians attribute the remainder of the cost of the war to inflation. Congress wrote an elaborate program of economic modernization that had the dual purpose of winning the war and permanently transforming the economy.

=== Financing the war ===
In 1860 the Treasury was a small operation that administered land sales and collected a low tariff. At the outbreak of war, the new Treasury Secretary, Salmon P. Chase, faced the challenge of financing the war without crippling the economy. His success meant that the government could pay its suppliers in readily negotiable currency. By contrast, the Confederate currency inflated so badly that by February 1864, a Confederate dollar was worth four cents in gold. Many citizens hid their horses and mules rather than exchange them for dubious paper. Overall, the Union's financial system was highly successful in supporting its war effort, while the Confederate system impoverished its citizens.

The United States spent $3.1 billion to fight the Civil War—over $400 million in 1862 alone. The largest source of revenue was excise taxes. The tax on 100 proof spirits, for example, was 20 cents per gallon. This was about equal to the cost of production, amounting to a 100% tax rate. After that came tariffs, raised in the waning days of the Buchanan administration and twice more during the war. They are known as Morrill tariffs after their sponsor. Next came an income tax, established during the war and repealed at war's end.

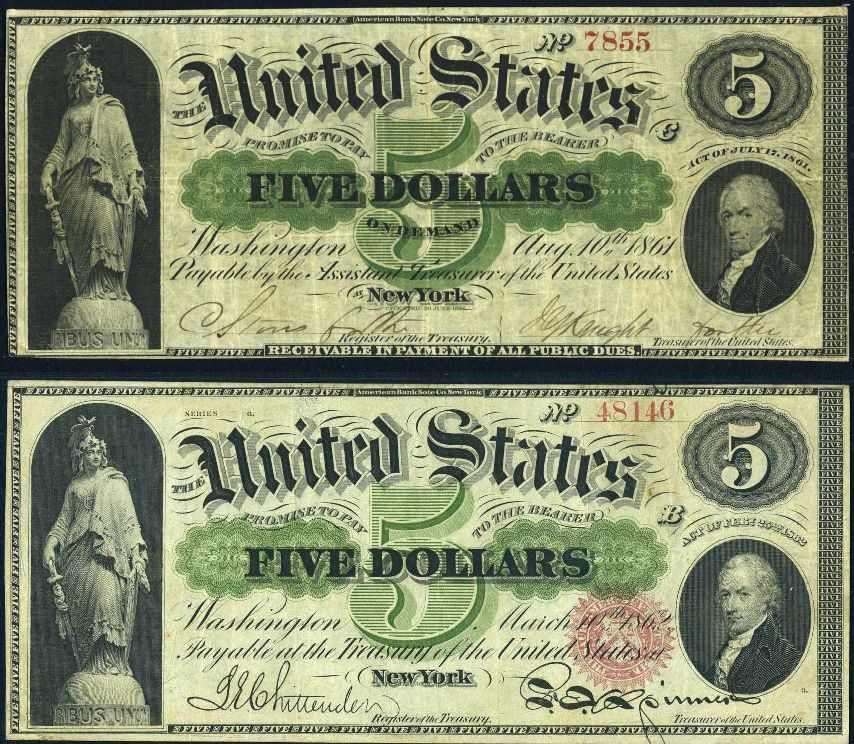
1862 Greenbacks

War finance also required the sale of government bonds. For the first time, bonds in small denominations were sold directly to the public, with publicity and patriotism as key factors, as designed by banker Jay Cooke.

The prewar paper money consisted of bank notes. The right to issue these was taken away from state-chartered banks and allowed only to newly established national banks.

The new bank charters were numbered in each city, so that the banking group getting the first charter proudly called themselves the "First National Bank", while the others had to adopt more mundane names, such as Crocker Bank or even Fifth Third Bank.

The government also printed paper money to compete with the banknotes. While banknotes were generally printed on only one side, the new government paper was printed on the back in green ink and came to be called "greenbacks".

The creation of a system of national banks provided a sound currency for wartime industrial expansion. Even more important, the hundreds of new national banks were required to purchase government bonds to form part of their reserves, helping war finance.

==== Tariffs ====
Secretary Chase, though a long-time free-trader, worked with Morrill to pass a second tariff bill in the summer of 1861, raising rates another 10 points in order to generate more revenues. These subsequent bills were primarily revenue driven to meet the war's needs, though they enjoyed the support of protectionists such as Carey, who again assisted Morrill in the bill's drafting. The Morrill Tariff of 1861 was designed to raise revenue. The tariff act of 1862 served not only to raise revenue but also to encourage the establishment of factories free from British competition by taxing British imports. Furthermore, it protected American factory workers from low paid European workers, and as a major bonus attracted tens of thousands of those Europeans to immigrate to America for high wage factory and craftsman jobs.

Customs revenue from tariffs totaled $345 million from 1861 through 1865 or 43% of all federal tax revenue. The Confederacy was denied this source of revenue by the Union blockade.

=== Land grants ===
The U.S. government owned vast amounts of fertile land (mostly from the Louisiana Purchase of 1803 and the Oregon Treaty with Britain in 1846). The challenge was to make the land useful to people and to provide the economic basis for the wealth that would pay off the war debt. Land grants went to railroad construction companies to open up the western plains and link up to California. Together with the free lands provided farmers by the Homestead Law the low-cost farm lands provided by the land grants sped up the expansion of commercial agriculture in the West.

The 1862 Homestead Act opened up the public domain lands for free. Land grants to the railroads meant they could sell tracts for family farms (80 to 200 acres) at low prices with extended credit. In addition the government sponsored fresh information, scientific methods and the latest techniques through the newly established Department of Agriculture and the Morrill Land Grant College Act.

=== Agriculture ===
Agriculture was the largest single industry and it prospered during the war. Prices were high, pulled up by a strong demand from the army and from Britain (which depended on American wheat for a fourth of its food imports). The war acted as a catalyst that encouraged the rapid adoption of horse-drawn machinery and other implements. The rapid spread of recent inventions such as the reaper and mower made the work force efficient, even as hundreds of thousands of farmers were in the army. Many wives took their place and often consulted by mail on what to do; increasingly they relied on community and extended kin for advice and help.

The Union used hundreds of thousands of animals. The Army had plenty of cash to purchase them from farmers and breeders but especially in the early months the quality was mixed. Horses were needed for cavalry and artillery. Mules pulled the wagons. The supply held up, despite an unprecedented epidemic of glanders, a fatal disease that baffled veterinarians.

=== Cotton trade ===
The Treasury started buying cotton during the war, for shipment to Europe and Northern mills. The sellers were Southern planters who needed the cash, regardless of their patriotism. Of the cotton run through the blockade and sold at ports in Mexico, Bermuda and the Bahamas, as much as half was bought by Northerners and shipped to Boston, Philadelphia and New York.

Cotton buyers who followed the armies and bought Southern cotton for shipment overland annoyed commanders like Ulysses Grant. He blamed Jewish traders and expelled them from his lines in 1862 but Lincoln quickly overruled this show of anti-semitism. Critics said the cotton trade helped the South, prolonged the war and fostered corruption. Lincoln decided to continue the trade for fear that Britain might intervene if its textile manufacturers were denied raw material. Another goal was to foster latent Unionism in the border states. Northern textile manufacturers needed cotton to remain in business and to make uniforms, while cotton exports to Europe provided an important source of gold to finance the war.

=== Industrial and business leaders and military inventors ===
- Matthias W. Baldwin
- Benjamin Bates IV
- John Jacob Bausch
- Andrew Carnegie
- Gardner Colby
- Samuel Colt
- Jay Cooke
- George Henry Corliss
- William Wesley Cornell
- Erastus Corning
- John Crerar (industrialist)
- Charles I. du Pont
- James Buchanan Eads
- John Ericsson
- William P. Halliday
- Benjamin Tyler Henry
- Gouverneur Kemble
- Benjamin Knight
- Robert Knight (industrialist)
- Benedict Lapham
- David Leavitt (banker)
- John Lenthall (shipbuilder)
- Henry Lomb
- William Mason (locomotive builder)
- William Metcalf (manufacturer)
- Samuel Morse
- Asa Packer
- Robert Parker Parrott
- Daniel Pratt (industrialist)
- George Pullman
- Christian Sharps
- David Sinton
- Horace Smith (inventor)
- Christopher Miner Spencer
- George Luther Stearns
- Henry J. Steere
- Ezekiel A. Straw
- John Edgar Thomson
- Cornelius Vanderbilt
- Ezra Warner (inventor)
- Daniel B. Wesson
- Rollin White
- Amos Whitney
- Oliver Winchester
- John F. Winslow
- George Worthington (businessman)

== Society ==
=== Religion ===
The Protestant religion was quite strong in the Union in the 1860s. The United States Christian Commission sent agents into the Army camps to provide psychological support as well as books, newspapers, food and clothing. Through prayer, sermons and welfare operations, the agents ministered to soldiers' spiritual as well as temporal needs as they sought to bring the men to a Christian way of life. Most churches made an effort to support their soldiers in the field and especially their families back home. Much of the political rhetoric of the era had a distinct religious tone.

The Protestant clergy in America took a variety of positions. In general, the pietistic denominations such as the Methodists, Northern Baptists and Congregationalists strongly supported the war effort. Catholics, Episcopalians, Lutherans and conservative Presbyterians generally avoided any discussion of the war, so it would not bitterly divide their membership. The Quakers, while giving strong support to the abolitionist movement on a personal level, refused to take a denominational position. Some clergymen who supported the Confederacy were denounced as Copperheads, especially in the border regions.

==== Methodists ====
Many Northerners had only recently become religious (following the Second Great Awakening) and religion was a powerful force in their lives. No denomination was more active in supporting the Union than the Methodist Episcopal Church. Carwardine argues that for many Methodists, the victory of Lincoln in 1860 heralded the arrival of the kingdom of God in America. They were moved into action by a vision of freedom for slaves, freedom from the persecutions of godly abolitionists, release from the Slave Power's evil grip on the American government and the promise of a new direction for the Union. Methodists formed a major element of the popular support for the Radical Republicans with their hard line toward the white South. Dissident Methodists left the church. During Reconstruction the Methodists took the lead in helping form Methodist churches for Freedmen and moving into Southern cities even to the point of taking control, with Army help, of buildings that had belonged to the southern branch of the church.

The Methodist family magazine Ladies' Repository promoted Christian family activism. Its articles provided moral uplift to women and children. It portrayed the War as a great moral crusade against a decadent Southern civilization corrupted by slavery. It recommended activities that family members could perform in order to aid the Union cause.

=== Family ===
Historian Stephen M. Frank reports that what it meant to be a father varied with status and age. He says most men demonstrated dual commitments as providers and nurturers and believed that husband and wife had mutual obligations toward their children. The war privileged masculinity, dramatizing and exaggerating, father-son bonds. Especially at five critical stages in the soldier's career (enlistment, blooding, mustering out, wounding and death) letters from absent fathers articulated a distinctive set of 19th-century ideals of manliness.

==== Children ====
There were numerous children's magazines, such as Merry's Museum, The Student and Schoolmate, Our Young Folks, The Little Pilgrim, Forrester's Playmate and The Little Corporal. They showed a Protestant religious tone and "promoted the principles of hard work, obedience, generosity, humility, and piety; trumpeted the benefits of family cohesion; and furnished mild adventure stories, innocent entertainment, and instruction". Their pages featured factual information and anecdotes about the war along with related quizzes, games, poems, songs, short oratorical pieces for "declamation", short stories and very short plays that children could stage. They promoted patriotism and the Union war aims, fostered kindly attitudes toward freed slaves, blackened the Confederates cause, encouraged readers to raise money for war-related humanitarian funds, and dealt with the death of family members. By 1866, the Milton Bradley Company was selling "The Myriopticon: A Historical Panorama of the Rebellion" that allowed children to stage a neighborhood show that would explain the war. It comprised colorful drawings that were turned on wheels and included pre-printed tickets, poster advertisements, and narration that could be read aloud at the show.

Caring for war orphans was an important function for local organizations as well as state and local government. A typical state was Iowa, where the private "Iowa Soldiers Orphans Home Association" operated with funding from the legislature and public donations. It set up orphanages in Davenport, Glenwood and Cedar Falls. The state government funded pensions for the widows and children of soldiers. Orphan schools like the Pennsylvania Soldiers' Orphan School, also spoke of the broader public welfare experiment that began as part of the aftermath of the Civil War. These orphan schools were created to provide housing, care, and education for orphans of Civil War soldiers. They became a matter of state pride, with orphans were paraded around at rallies to display the power of a patriotic schooling.

All the free states had free public school systems before the war but not the border states. West Virginia set up its system in 1863. Over bitter opposition it established an almost-equal education for black children, most of whom were ex-slaves. Thousands of black refugees poured into St. Louis, where the Freedmen's Relief Society, the Ladies Union Aid Society, the Western Sanitary Commission, and the American Missionary Association (AMA) set up schools for their children.

== Unionists in Southern and Border states ==
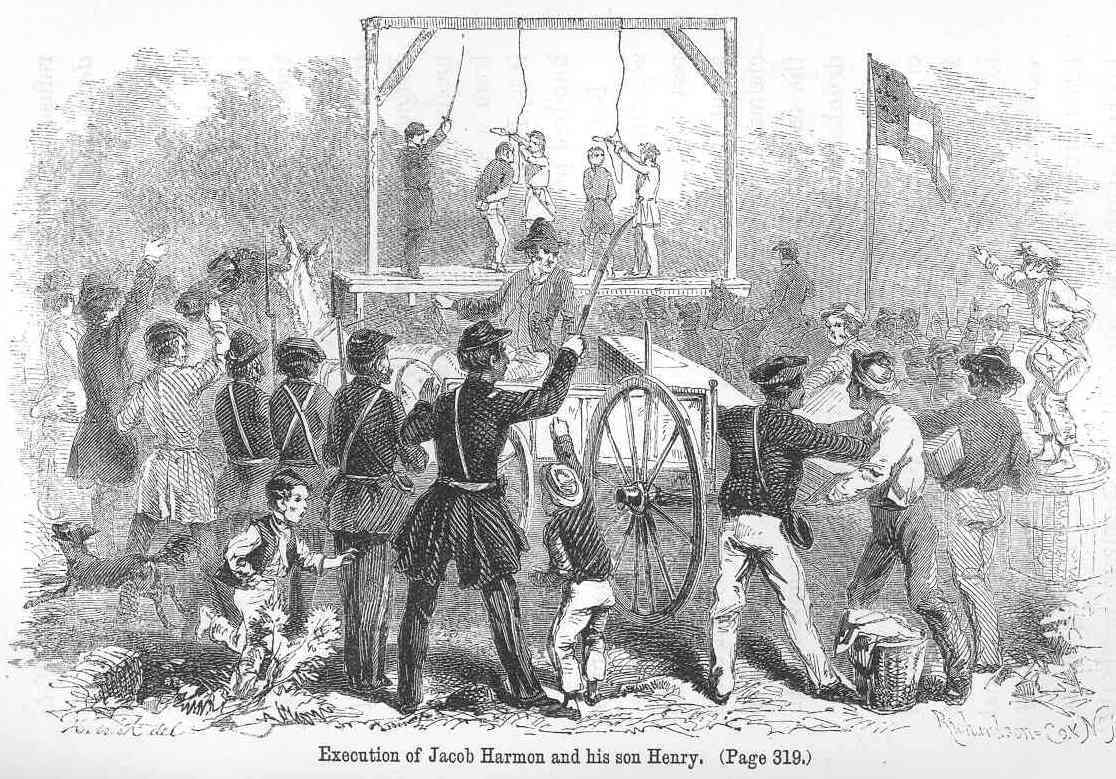
Confederate soldiers hanging pro-Union bridge-burning conspirators

People loyal to the U.S. federal government and opposed to secession living in the border states (where slavery was legal) and states under Confederate control, were termed Unionists. Confederates sometimes styled them "Homemade Yankees". The opinion group of Southern Unionists included both unconditional unionists whose allegiance to the national government was unequivocal and conditional unionists who shared the priorities of many secessionists, but preferred sectional compromise to disunion; many conditional unionists subsequently supported the Confederacy after failing to prevent secession. East Tennessee never supported the Confederacy fully, and Unionists there became powerful state leaders, including governors Andrew Johnson and William G. Brownlow. Likewise, large pockets of eastern Kentucky were Unionist and helped keep the state from seceding. In western Virginia the counties that bordered Ohio and Pennsylvania were Unionist strongholds, though the interior counties supported Richmond and the Confederacy. With the aid of the Union army, and support in Congress, a Unionist government in Wheeling was able to create a new state, West Virginia, in 1863. The new state government however had control of no more than half its territory. The Union army remained in West Virginia until 1869, dealing with unrest and resistance to the new state.

Nearly 100,000 Unionists from the South served in the Union Army during the Civil War and Unionist regiments were raised from every Confederate state except for South Carolina. Among such units was the 1st Alabama Cavalry Regiment, which served as William Sherman's personal escort on his march to the sea. Southern Unionists were extensively used as anti-guerrilla paramilitary forces. During the Reconstruction era (1865–1877), many Southern Unionists became "Scalawags", a derogatory term for white Southern supporters of the Republican Party.

=== Guerrilla warfare ===
Besides organized military conflict, the border states were beset by guerrilla warfare. In states bitterly divided, neighbors frequently used the excuse of war to settle personal grudges and took up arms against neighbors.

==== Missouri ====
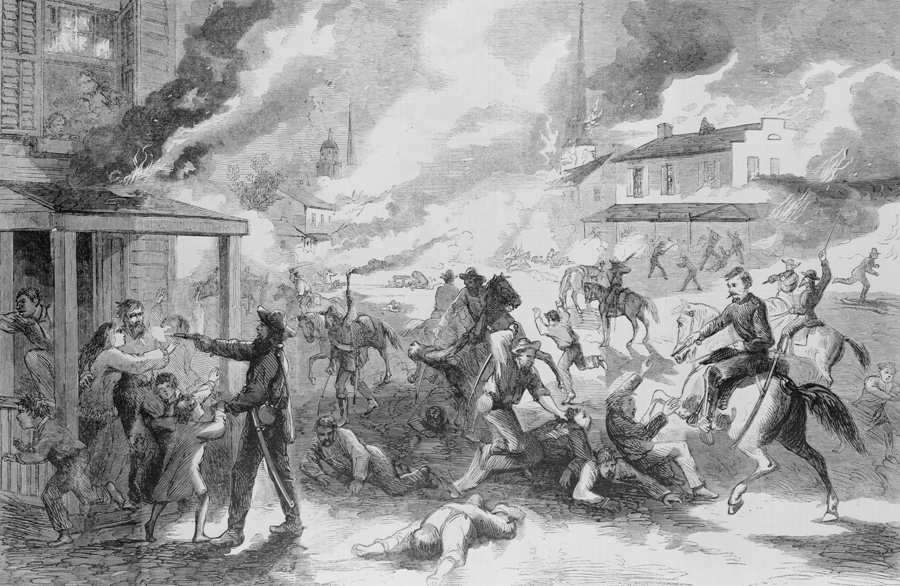
Contemporary illustration for Harper's Weekly of Confederate guerrillas attacking the town of Lawrence, Kansas in August 1863, burning buildings and killing civilians.

Missouri was the scene of over 1,000 engagements between Union and Confederate forces, and uncounted numbers of guerrilla attacks and raids by informal pro-Confederate bands. Western Missouri was the scene of brutal guerrilla warfare during the Civil War. Roving insurgent bands such as Quantrill's Raiders and the men of Bloody Bill Anderson terrorized the countryside, striking both military installations and civilian settlements. Because of the widespread attacks and the protection offered by Confederate sympathizers, Federal leaders issued General Order No. 11 in 1863, and evacuated areas of Jackson, Cass, and Bates counties. They forced the residents out to reduce support for the guerrillas. Union cavalry could sweep through and track down Confederate guerrillas, who no longer had places to hide and people and infrastructure to support them. On short notice, the army forced almost 20,000 people, mostly women, children and the elderly, to leave their homes. Many never returned and the affected counties were economically devastated for years after the end of the war. Families passed along stories of their bitter experiences down through several generations—future U.S. President Harry Truman's grandparents were caught up in the raids, and he would tell of how they were kept in concentration camps.

Some marauding units became organized criminal gangs after the war. In 1882, the bank robber and ex-Confederate guerrilla Jesse James was killed in Saint Joseph, Missouri. Vigilante groups appeared in remote areas where law enforcement was weak, to deal with the lawlessness left over from the guerrilla warfare phase. For example, the Bald Knobbers were the term for several law-and-order vigilante groups in the Ozarks. In some cases, they too turned to illegal gang activity.

==== Kentucky ====
In response to the growing problem of locally organized guerrilla campaigns throughout 1863 and 1864, in June 1864, Maj. Gen. Stephen G. Burbridge was given command over the state of Kentucky. This began an extended period of military control that would last through early 1865, beginning with martial law authorized by President Abraham Lincoln. To pacify Kentucky, Burbridge rigorously suppressed disloyalty and used economic pressure as coercion. His guerrilla policy, which included public execution of four guerrillas for the death of each unarmed Union citizen, caused the most controversy. After a falling out with Governor Thomas E. Bramlette, Burbridge was dismissed in February 1865. Confederates remembered him as the "Butcher of Kentucky".

== Union states ==
- Washington, D.C.

List of Wikipedia articles on Union states and major cities:

- California
- Connecticut
- Delaware*
- Illinois
- Indiana
  - Indianapolis
- Iowa
- Kansas
- Kentucky†*
  - Lexington
  - Louisville
- Maine
- Maryland*
  - Baltimore
- Massachusetts
- Michigan
- Minnesota
- Missouri†*
  - St. Louis
- Nevada
- New Hampshire
- New Jersey
- New York
  - New York City
- Ohio
  - Cincinnati
  - Cleveland
- Oregon
- Pennsylvania
  - Harrisburg
  - Philadelphia
  - Pittsburgh
- Rhode Island
- Vermont
- Virginia†*
- West Virginia*
- Wisconsin

* Border states with slavery in 1861

†Had two state governments, one Unionist one Confederate, both claiming to be the legitimate government of their state. Kentucky's and Missouri's Confederate governments never had significant control after 1862, though the Confederacy controlled more than half of Kentucky and the southern part of Missouri early in the war.

West Virginia separated from Virginia and became part of the Union during the war, on June 20, 1863. Nevada also joined the Union during the war, becoming a state on October 31, 1864.

=== Union territories ===
The Union-controlled territories in April 1861 were:

- Colorado Territory
- Dakota Territory
- Indian Territory (disputed with the Confederacy)
- Nebraska Territory
- Nevada Territory (became a state in 1864)
- New Mexico Territory
  - Arizona Territory (split off in 1863)
- Utah Territory
- Washington Territory
  - Idaho Territory (split off in 1863)
    - Montana Territory (split off in 1864)

The Indian Territory saw its own civil war, as the major tribes held slaves and endorsed the Confederacy.

== See also ==
- American Civil War prison camps
- Perpetual Union
- Central Confederacy

== Bibliography ==
=== Surveys ===
- Cashin, Joan E. ed. The War Was You and Me: Civilians in the American Civil War (2001),
- Fellman, Michael et al. This Terrible War: The Civil War and its Aftermath (2nd ed. 2007), 544-page university textbook
- Flaherty, Jane (June 2009). ""The Exhausted Condition of the Treasury" on the Eve of the Civil War". Civil War History. 55 (2): 244–277. doi:10.1353/cwh.0.0058. ISSN 1533-6271. S2CID 144177006 – via Project MUSE.
- Ford, Lacy K., ed. A Companion to the Civil War and Reconstruction. (2005). 518 pp. 23 essays by scholars excerpt and text search
- Gallman, J. Matthew. The North Fights the Civil War: The Home Front (1994), survey
- Gallman, J. Matthew. Northerners at War: Reflections on the Civil War Home Front (2010), essays on specialized issues
- Heidler, David and Jeanne Heidler, eds., Encyclopedia of the American Civil War: A Political, Social, and Military History (2002) 2740 pp.
- McPherson, James M. Battle Cry of Freedom: The Civil War Era (1988), 900-page survey; Pulitzer prize-winner
- Nevins, Allan. War for the Union, an 8-volume set (1947–1971). the most detailed political, economic and military narrative; by Pulitzer Prize-winner; vol. 1–4 cover 1848–61; vol. 5. The Improvised War, 1861–62; 6. War Becomes Revolution, 1862–63; 7. The Organized War, 1863–64; 8. The Organized War to Victory, 1864–65
- Resch, John P. et al., Americans at War: Society, Culture and the Homefront vol 2: 1816–1900 (2005)

=== Politics ===
- Bogue, Allan G. The Congressman's Civil War (1989)
- Carman, Harry J. and Reinhard H. Luthin. Lincoln and the Patronage (1943), details on each state
- Donald, David Herbert. Lincoln (1999); excerpt and text search
- Engle, Stephen D. Gathering to Save a Nation: Lincoln and the Union's War Governors (University of North Carolina Press, 2016). 725 pp.
- Fish, Carl Russell (1902). "Lincoln and the Patronage". The American Historical Review. 8 (1): 53–69. doi:10.2307/1832574. hdl:2027/loc.ark:/13960/t47p94851. ISSN 0002-8762. JSTOR 1832574.
- Gallagher, Gary W. The Union War (2011), emphasizes that the North fought primarily for nationalism and preservation of the Union
- Goodwin, Doris Kearns. Team of Rivals: The Political Genius of Abraham Lincoln (2005) excerpts and text search, on Lincoln's cabinet
- Green, Michael S. Freedom, Union, and Power: Lincoln and His Party during the Civil War. (2004). 400 pp.
- Harris, William C. Lincoln and the Union Governors (Southern Illinois University Press, 2013) 162 pp.
- Hesseltine, William B. Lincoln and the War Governors (1948)
- Kleppner, Paul. The Third Electoral System, 1853–1892: Parties, Voters, and Political Culture (1979), statistical study of voting patterns.
- Lawson, Melinda. Patriot Fires: Forging a New American Nationalism in the Civil War North (University Press of Kansas, 2002).
- Luthin, Reinhard H. The First Lincoln Campaign (1944) on election of 1860
- Neely Jr., Mark E. The Divided Union: Party Conflict in the Civil War North (2002)
- Paludan, Philip S. The Presidency of Abraham Lincoln (1994), thorough treatment of Lincoln's administration
- Rawley, James A. The Politics of Union: Northern Politics during the Civil War (1974).
- Richardson, Heather Cox. The Greatest Nation of the Earth: Republican Economic Policies during the Civil War (1997)
- Silbey, Joel. A Respectable Minority: The Democratic Party in the Civil War Era (1977).
- Smith, Adam I. P. No Party Now: Politics in the Civil War North (Oxford University Press, 2006)
- Smith, Michael Thomas. The Enemy Within: Fears of Corruption in the Civil War North (2011) review
- Weber, Jennifer L. Copperheads: The Rise and Fall of Lincoln's Opponents in the North (2006) excerpt and text search

=== Constitutional and legal ===
- Hyman, Harold. A More Perfect Union: The Impact of the Civil War and Reconstruction on the Constitution (Alfred A. Knopf, 1973)
- Neely Jr., Mark E. The Fate of Liberty: Abraham Lincoln and Civil Liberties (Oxford University Press, 1991); won the 1992 Pulitzer Prize for History.
- Neely Jr., Mark E. Lincoln and the Triumph of the Nation: Constitutional Conflict in the American Civil War (University of North Carolina Press, 2011); covers the U.S. and the Confederate constitutions and their role in the conflict.
- Paludan, Phillip S. (October 1972). "The American Civil War Considered as a Crisis in Law and Order". The American Historical Review. 77 (4): 1013–1034. doi:10.2307/1859506. ISSN 0002-8762. JSTOR 1859506.

=== Economic ===
- Brandes, Stuart. Warhogs: A History of War Profits in America (1997), pp. 67–88; a scholarly history of the munitions industry; concludes profits were not excessive
- Clark Jr., John E. Railroads in the Civil War: The Impact of Management on Victory and Defeat (2004)
- Cotterill, R. S. "The Louisville and Nashville Railroad 1861–1865", American Historical Review (1924) 29#4 pp. 700–715 in JSTOR
- Fite, Emerson David. Social and industrial conditions in the North during the Civil War (1910) online edition, old but still quite useful
- Hammond, Bray. "The North's Empty Purse, 1861–1862", American Historical Review, October 1961, Vol. 67 Issue 1, pp. 1–18 in JSTOR
- Hill, Joseph A. "The Civil War Income Tax", Quarterly Journal of Economics Vol. 8, No. 4 (July 1894), pp. 416–452 in JSTOR; appendix in JSTOR
- Lowenstein, Roger. Ways and Means: Lincoln and His Cabinet and the Financing of the Civil War (2022); major scholarly survey; online review
- Merk, Frederick. Economic history of Wisconsin during the Civil War decade (1916) online edition
- Smith, Michael Thomas. The Enemy Within: Fears of Corruption in the Civil War North (2011) details on Treasury Department, government contracting, and the cotton trade
- Weber, Thomas. The northern railroads in the Civil War, 1861–1865 (1999)
- Wilson, Mark R. The Business of Civil War: Military Mobilization and the State, 1861–1865. (2006). 306 pp. excerpt and text search
- Ziparo, Jessica. This grand experiment: When women entered the federal workforce in Civil War–Era Washington, DC (UNC Press Books, 2017).
- Zonderman, David A. "White Workers and the American Civil War." Oxford Research Encyclopedia of American History (2021).

=== Intellectual and cultural ===
- Aaron, Daniel. The Unwritten War: American Writers and the Civil War (2nd ed. 1987)
- Brownlee, Peter John et al., eds. Home Front: Daily Life in the Civil War North (2013) online review
- Foote, Lorien and Kanisorn Wongsrichanalai. So Conceived and So Dedicated: Intellectual Life in the Civil War Era North (2015)
- Gallman, J. Matthew. Defining Duty in the Civil War: Personal Choice, Popular Culture, and the Union Home Front (2015) how civilians defined their roles. online review
- Fredrickson, George M. The Inner Civil War: Northern Intellectuals and the Crisis of the Union (1993)
- Stevenson, Louise A. The Victorian Homefront: American Thought and Culture, 1860–1880 (1991)
- Wilson, Edmund. Patriotic Gore: Studies in the Literature of the American Civil War (1962)

=== Medical ===
- Adams, George Worthington. Doctors in Blue: The Medical History of the Union Army in the Civil War (1996), 253 pp; excerpt and text search
- Clarke, Frances M. War Stories: Suffering and Sacrifice in the Civil War North (University of Chicago Press, 2012)
- Grant, S.-M. "'Mortal in this season': Union Surgeons and the Narrative of Medical Modernisation in the American Civil War." Social History of Medicine (2014)
- Maxwell, William Quentin. Lincoln's Fifth Wheel: The Political History of the U.S. Sanitary Commission (1956)
- Schroeder-Lein, Glenna R. The Encyclopedia of Civil War Medicine (2012) excerpt and text search

=== Race ===
- McPherson, James M. The Negro's Civil War: How American Negroes Felt and Acted During the War for the Union (1965). Also issued as Marching Toward Freedom: The Negro's Civil War (1965), and Marching Toward Freedom: Blacks in the Civil War, 1861-1865 (1991).
- Quarles, Benjamin. The Negro in the Civil War (1953).
- Voegeli, V. Jacque. Free But Not Equal: The Midwest and the Negro during the Civil War (1967).

=== Religion and ethnicity ===
- Brodrecht, Grant R. "Our Country: Northern Evangelicals and the Union during the Civil War Era." (2018). 288 pp.
- Burton, William L. Melting Pot Soldiers: The Union Ethnic Regiments (1998)
- Kamphoefner, Walter D. "German-Americans and Civil War Politics: A Reconsideration of the Ethnocultural Thesis." Civil War History 37 (1991): 232–246.
- Kleppner, Paul. The Third Electoral System, 1853–1892: Parties, Voters, and Political Culture (1979).
- Miller, Randall M., Harry S. Stout and Charles Reagan Wilson, eds. Religion and the American Civil War (1998)
- Miller, Robert J. Both Prayed to the Same God: Religion and Faith in the American Civil War. (2007). 260 pp
- Moorhead, James. American Apocalypse: Yankee Protestants and the Civil War, 1860–1869 (1978).
- Noll, Mark A. The Civil War as a Theological Crisis. (2006). 199 pp.
- Stout, Harry S. Upon the Altar of the Nation: A Moral History of the Civil War. (2006). 544 pp.

=== Social and demographic history ===
- Brownlee, Peter John, et al. Home Front: Daily Life in the Civil War North (University of Chicago Press, 2013) 193 pp. heavily illustrated.
- Morehouse, Maggi M. and Zoe Trodd, eds. Civil War America: A Social and Cultural History with Primary Sources (2013), 29 short essays by scholars excerpt
- Raus, Edmund J. Banners South: Northern Community at War (2011), about Cortland, New York
- Vinovskis, Maris A., ed. Toward a Social History of the American Civil War: Exploratory Essays (1991), new social history; quantitative studies
- Vinovskis, Maris A., ed. "Have Social Historians Lost the Civil War? Some Preliminary Demographic Speculations", Journal of American History Vol. 76, No. 1 (June 1989), pp. 34–58 JSTOR 1908343
- Veit, Helen Zoe, ed. Food in the Civil War Era: The North (Michigan State University Press, 2014)

=== Soldiers ===
- Geary James W. We Need Men: The Union Draft in the Civil War (1991).
- Geary James W. "Civil War Conscription in the North: A Historiographical Review." Civil War History 32 (September 1986): 208–228.
- Hams, Emily J. "Sons and Soldiers: Deerfield, Massachusetts, and the Civil War", Civil War History 30 (June 1984): 157–171
- Hess, Earl J. "The 12th Missouri Infantry: A Socio-Military Profile of a Union Regiment", Missouri Historical Review 76 (October 1981): 53–77.
- Cimbala, Paul A. and Randall M. Miller, eds. Union Soldiers and the Northern Home Front: Wartime Experiences, Postwar Adjustments. (2002)
- Costa, Dora L., and Matthew E. Kahn. "Cowards and heroes: Group loyalty in the American Civil War." Quarterly Journal of Economics 118.2 (2003): 519–548. Statistical study based on sample of 32,000 Union soldiers. online
- Current, Richard N. (1992). Lincoln's Loyalists: Union Soldiers from the Confederacy. Oxford, England: Oxford University Press. ISBN 0195084659.
- McPherson, James. For Cause and Comrades: Why Men Fought in the Civil War (1998), based on letters and diaries
- Miller, William J. Training of an Army: Camp Curtin and the North's Civil War (1990)
- Mitchell; Reid. The Vacant Chair. The Northern Soldier Leaves Home (1993).
- Rorabaugh, William J. "Who Fought for the North in the Civil War? Concord, Massachusetts, Enlistments", Journal of American History 73 (December 1986): 695–701 in JSTOR
- Roseboom, Eugene H. The Civil War Era, 1850–1873 (1944), Ohio
- Scott, Sean A. "'Earth Has No Sorrow That Heaven Cannot Cure': Northern Civilian Perspectives on Death and Eternity during the Civil War", Journal of Social History (2008) 41:843–866
- Wiley, Bell I. The Life of Billy Yank: The Common Soldier of the Union (1952)

=== State and local ===
- Appleton's Annual Cyclopedia...1863 (1864), detailed coverage of events in all countries; online; for online copies see Annual Cyclopaedia. Each year 1861 to 1902 includes several pages on each U.S. state.
- Tucker, Spencer, ed. American Civil War: A State-by-State Encyclopedia (2 vol 2015) 1019pp excerpt
- Aley, Ginette et al. eds. Union Heartland: The Midwestern Home Front during the Civil War (2013)
- Bak, Richard. A Distant Thunder: Michigan in the Civil War. (2004). 239 pp.
- Baker, Jean H. The Politics of Continuity: Maryland Political Parties from 1858 to 1870 (1973)
- Baum, Dale. The Civil War Party System: The Case of Massachusetts, 1848–1876 (1984)
- Bradley, Erwin S. The Triumph of Militant Republicanism: A Study of Pennsylvania and Presidential Politics, 1860–1872 (1964)
- Castel, Albert. A Frontier State at War: Kansas, 1861–1865 (1958)
- Cole, Arthur Charles. The Era of the Civil War 1848–1870 (1919) on Illinois
- Coulter, E. Merton. The Civil War and Readjustment in Kentucky (1926),
- Current, Richard N. The History of Wisconsin: The Civil War Era, 1848–1873 (1976).
- Dee, Christine, ed. Ohio's war: the Civil War in documents (2006), primary sources excerpt and text search
- Dilla, Harriette M. Politics of Michigan, 1865–1878 (Columbia University Press, 1912) online at Google books
- Gallman, Matthew J. Mastering Wartime: A Social History of Philadelphia During the Civil War. (1990)
- Hall, Susan G. Appalachian Ohio and the Civil War, 1862–1863 (2008)
- Holzer, Harold, ed. State of the Union: New York and the Civil War (2002)
- Hubbard, Mark. Illinois's War: The Civil War in Documents (2012) excerpt and text search
- Karamanski, Theodore J. Rally 'Round the Flag: Chicago and the Civil War (1993).
- Leech, Margaret. Reveille in Washington, 1860–1865 (1941), Pulitzer Prize
- Miller, Richard F. ed. States at War, Volume 1: A Reference Guide for Connecticut, Maine, Massachusetts, New Hampshire, Rhode Island, and Vermont in the Civil War (2013) excerpt
  - Miller, Richard F. ed. States at War, Volume 2: A Reference Guide for New York in the Civil War (2014) excerpt
- Nation, Richard F. and Stephen E. Towne. Indiana's War: The Civil War in Documents (2009), primary sources excerpt and text search
- Niven, John. Connecticut for the Union: The Role of the State in the Civil War (Yale University Press, 1965)
- O'Connor, Thomas H. Civil War Boston (1999)
- Parrish, William E. A History of Missouri, Volume III: 1860 to 1875 (1973) (ISBN 0826201482)
- Pierce, Bessie. A History of Chicago, Volume II: From Town to City 1848–1871 (1940)
- Schouler, William (1868). A History of Massachusetts in the Civil War. Boston: E.P. Dutton & Co. ISBN 9781582180014. OCLC 2662693.
- Ponce, Pearl T. Kansas's War: The Civil War in Documents (2011) excerpt and text search
- Raus, Edmund J. Banners South: Northern Community at War (2011) about Cortland, New York
- Roseboom, Eugene. The Civil War Era, 1850–1873, History of Ohio, vol. 4 (1944) online, Detailed scholarly history
- Siddali, Silvana R. Missouri's War: The Civil War in Documents (2009), primary sources excerpt and text search
- Stampp, Kenneth M. Indiana Politics during the Civil War (1949)
- Taylor, Paul. "Old Slow Town": Detroit during the Civil War (Detroit: Wayne State University Press, 2013). x, 248 pp.
- Thornbrough, Emma Lou. Indiana in the Civil War Era, 1850–1880 (1965)
- Ware, Edith E. Political Opinion in Massachusetts during the Civil War and Reconstruction, (1916). full text online

=== Women and family ===
- "Bonnet Brigades at Fifty: Reflections on Mary Elizabeth Massey and Gender in Civil War History", Civil War History (2015) 61#4 pp. 400–444.
- Anderson, J. L. "The Vacant Chair on the Farm: Soldier Husbands, Farm Wives, and the Iowa Home Front, 1861–1865", Annals of Iowa (2007) 66: 241–265
- Attie, Jeanie. Patriotic Toil: Northern Women and the American Civil War (1998). 294 pp.
- Bahde, Thomas. "'I never wood git tired of wrighting to you.'" Journal of Illinois History (2009). 12:129–155
- Cashin, Joan E. "American Women and the American Civil War" Journal of Military History (2017) 81#1 pp. 199–204.
- Giesberg, Judith. Army at Home: Women and the Civil War on the Northern Home Front (2009) excerpt and text search
- Giesberg, Judith Ann. "From Harvest Field to Battlefield: Rural Pennsylvania Women and the U.S. Civil War", Pennsylvania History (2005). 72: 159–191
- Harper, Judith E. Women during the Civil War: An Encyclopedia. (2004). 472 pp.
- McDevitt, Theresa. Women and the American Civil War: an annotated bibliography (Praeger, 2003).
- Marten, James. Children for the Union: The War Spirit on the Northern Home Front. Ivan R. Dee, 2004. 209 pp.
- Massey, Mary. Bonnet Brigades: American Women and the Civil War (1966), overview North and South; reissued as Women in the Civil War (1994)
  - "Bonnet Brigades at Fifty: Reflections on Mary Elizabeth Massey and Gender in Civil War History", Civil War History (2015) 61#4 pp. 400–444.
  - Giesberg, Judith. "Mary Elizabeth Massey and the Civil War Centennial." Civil War History 61.4 (2015): 400–406. online
- Rodgers, Thomas E. "Hoosier Women and the Civil War Home Front", Indiana Magazine of History 97#2 (2001), pp. 105–128 JSTOR 27792305
- Silber, Nina. Daughters of the Union: Northern Women Fight the Civil War. (Harvard UP, 2005). 332 pp.
- Venet, Wendy Hamand. A Strong-Minded Woman: The Life of Mary Livermore. (U. of Massachusetts Press, 2005). 322 pp.

=== Primary sources ===
- American Annual Cyclopaedia for 1861 (N.Y.: Appleton's, 1864), an extensive collection of reports on each state, Congress, military activities and many other topics; annual issues from 1861 to 1901
- Appletons' annual cyclopedia and register of important events: Embracing political, military, and ecclesiastical affairs; public documents; biography, statistics, commerce, finance, literature, science, agriculture, and mechanical industry, Volume 3 1863 (1864), thorough coverage of the events of 1863
- Angle, Paul M. and Earl Schenck Miers, eds. Tragic Years, 1860–1865: A Documentary History of the American Civil War – Vol. 1 1960
- Carter, Susan B., ed. The Historical Statistics of the United States: Millennial Edition (5 vols), 2006; online at many universities
- Commager, Henry Steele, ed. The Blue and the Gray. The Story of the Civil War as Told by Participants. (1950), excerpts from primary sources
- Dee, Christine, ed. Ohio's War: The Civil War in Documents. (2007). 244 pp.
- Freidel Frank, ed. Union Pamphlets of the Civil War, 1861–1865 (2 vol. 1967)
- Hesseltine, William B., ed. The Tragic Conflict: The Civil War and Reconstruction (1962), excerpts from primary sources
- Marten, James, ed. Civil War America: Voices from the Home Front. (2003). 346 pp.
- Risley, Ford, ed. The Civil War: Primary Documents on Events from 1860 to 1865. (2004). 320 pp.
- Siddali, Silvana R. Missouri's War: The Civil War in Documents (2009), 256pp excerpt and text search
- Sizer, Lyde Cullen and Jim Cullen, ed. The Civil War Era: An Anthology of Sources. (2005). 434 pp.
- Smith, Charles Winston and Charles Judah, eds. Life in the North during the Civil War: A Source History (1966)
- Voss-Hubbard, Mark, ed. Illinois's War: The Civil War in Documents (2013) online review
- diaries, journals. reminiscences
- "The Peoples Contest: A Civil War era digital archiving project", access to primary sources from Pennsylvania, especially newspapers and other resources
