= Quimby House =

Quimby House may refer to:

- Howe-Quimby House, Hopkinton, New Hampshire, listed on the National Register of Historic Places in Merrimack County, New Hampshire
- Dr. Samuel Quimby House, Mount Vernon, Maine, listed on the National Register of Historic Places in Kennebec County, Maine
