= Thomas Angell (professor) =

American pastor and academic (1837–1923)

Thomas L. Angell
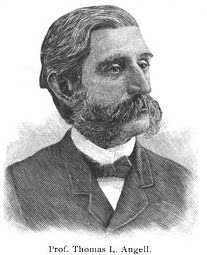
- Angell professor at Bates College in Maine and Free Will Baptist minister
- Born: 1837; Greenville, Rhode Island, United States
- Died: 1923 (aged 85–86); Worcester, Massachusetts, United States
- Education: Brown University (1862)
- Occupations: Pastor, Academic
- Years active: 1864–1902
- Known for: Leader of the Lapham Institute, Early professor at Bates College
- Spouse: Emily Brown (d. 1902)
- Children: Mary Frances Lincoln
- Parent(s): Pardon Angell, Mary Ann Angell
- Relatives: Descendant of Thomas Angell (early settler of Rhode Island)

Thomas L. Angell (1837–1923) was an American Free Will Baptist pastor, academic, leader of the Lapham Institute, and early professor at Bates College in Maine.

Thomas L. Angell was born in 1837 in Greenville, Rhode Island to Pardon and Mary Ann Angell who were both descendants of Thomas Angell, a Baptist who was one of the first settlers of Rhode Island. Angell attended the common school in Greenville and the Smithville Seminary and then Thetford Academy, Vermont and Wilbraham Academy where he prepared to attend Brown University, enrolling in 1858. In 1862 during the Civil War, Angell graduated from Brown and enlisted in the Rhode Island militia as aide de camp for General Tourtellotte. Upon his graduation, Angell taught school briefly in Greenville before attending Hartford Seminary. In 1864 he began teaching at the Lapham Institute in North Scituate, Rhode Island with Benjamin F. Hayes, and eventually succeeded Hayes as principal, working at the school for four years. In 1869, he followed Hayes to Bates College, succeeding him as professor of French and German modern languages, and Angell remained at Bates until 1902. Angell also served as a Free Will Baptist pastor.

Angell was married Emily Brown until her death in 1902 and had one daughter, Mary Frances Lincoln, who graduated from Bates in 1890. Angell died in 1923 in Worcester, Massachusetts. Angel was a party in a Rhode Island Supreme Court case of Angell v. Angell, 28 RI 592 (1908), which addressed his father's estate. Several of Angell's early diaries and other letters from his time in Rhode Island and Maine are held in the Bates College Special Collections Library.
