= Quimby (surname) =

Quimby is an English surname derived from a toponym such as Quenby. It may refer to:

== People ==
- Althea G. Quimby (1858–1942), American temperance leader
- Art Quimby (1933–2010), American college basketball player
- Bill Quimby (1936–2018), American author, columnist, editor and publisher
- Constance Quimby, American politician, member of the Vermont House of Representatives from 2013 to 2021
- Darius Quimby (died 1791), first American law enforcement officer killed in line of duty
- Edith Quimby (1891–1982), American medical researcher and physicist
- George Irving Quimby (1913–2003), anthropologist, author of books on colonization of America
- Fred Quimby (1886–1965), American cartoon producer, a producer of Tom and Jerry cartoons
- Harriet Quimby (1875–1912), American aviator and journalist, first woman in the United States to receive a pilot certificate and first woman to fly across the English Channel
- Hosea Quimby (1804–1878), American pastor, author and seminary president
- John Quimby (1935–2012), American politician
- John B. Quimby (1823–1904), American politician
- Margaret Quimby (1904–1965), American stage and film actress
- Marguerite Quimby (1896–1983), American politician
- Phineas Parkhurst Quimby (1802–1866), American clockmaker, mentalist and mesmerist
- Robert Quimby (born 1976), American astronomer
- Roxanne Quimby (born 1950), American businesswoman and philanthropist
- Shirley Leon Quimby (1893–1986), American physicist

== Fictional characters ==
- Mayor Quimby, in the animated TV series The Simpsons
- Police Chief Quimby, in the Inspector Gadget series
- Fletcher Quimby, in the teen sitcom A.N.T. Farm
- Ramona Quimby, Beezus Quimby, Roberta Quimby and Mrs. Dorothy Quimby, in a series of children's books by Beverly Cleary
