= Benjamin Francis Hayes =

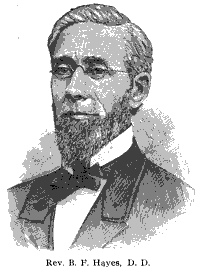
Bejamin Francis Hayes, professor at Bates College

Benjamin Francis Hayes (1830-1906) was a Free Will Baptist pastor, author, principal of the Lapham Institute, and early professor at Bates College in Maine.

Benjamin Hayes was born in New Gloucester, Maine in 1830 to Mary (Harmon) Hayes and Rev. Jesse Hayes, a Baptist minister. Benjamin Hayes graduated from Bowdoin College in 1855 and received an M.A. from Bowdoin in 1858. He then taught at the Free Will Baptist Theological Seminary at the New Hampton Institute before becoming a pastor in Olneyville, Rhode Island in 1859 and serving until 1863 when he became principal of the Lapham Institute in Scituate, Rhode Island serving until 1865, when he became a professor at Bates College. He was replaced at Lapham by Thomas Angell in 1865 who later followed him to Bates as a professor of modern languages in 1869.

At Bates Hayes served as Professor of Modern Languages and trustee from 1865 to 1868, Professor of Rhetoric and English Literature from 1868 to 1869, Professor of Mental and Moral Philosophy from 1869 to 1875, Professor of Psychology and Exegetical Theology from 1875 to 1894, and Cobb Divinity School Professor of Apologetics and Pastoral Theology from 1894 to 1906. He died in Lewiston in 1906. Hayes' son Edward Cary Hayes was a notable sociologist who wrote a book about his father, entitled A Memoir of Prof. Benjamin Francis Hayes, D. D.,: With Brief Extracts from His Writings. Some of Hayes' original writings are now held by the Bates College Special Collections Library.
