= Smithville Seminary =

United States Historic Place (1839–1876)

- U.S. National Register of Historic Places
- U.S. Historic district – Contributing property
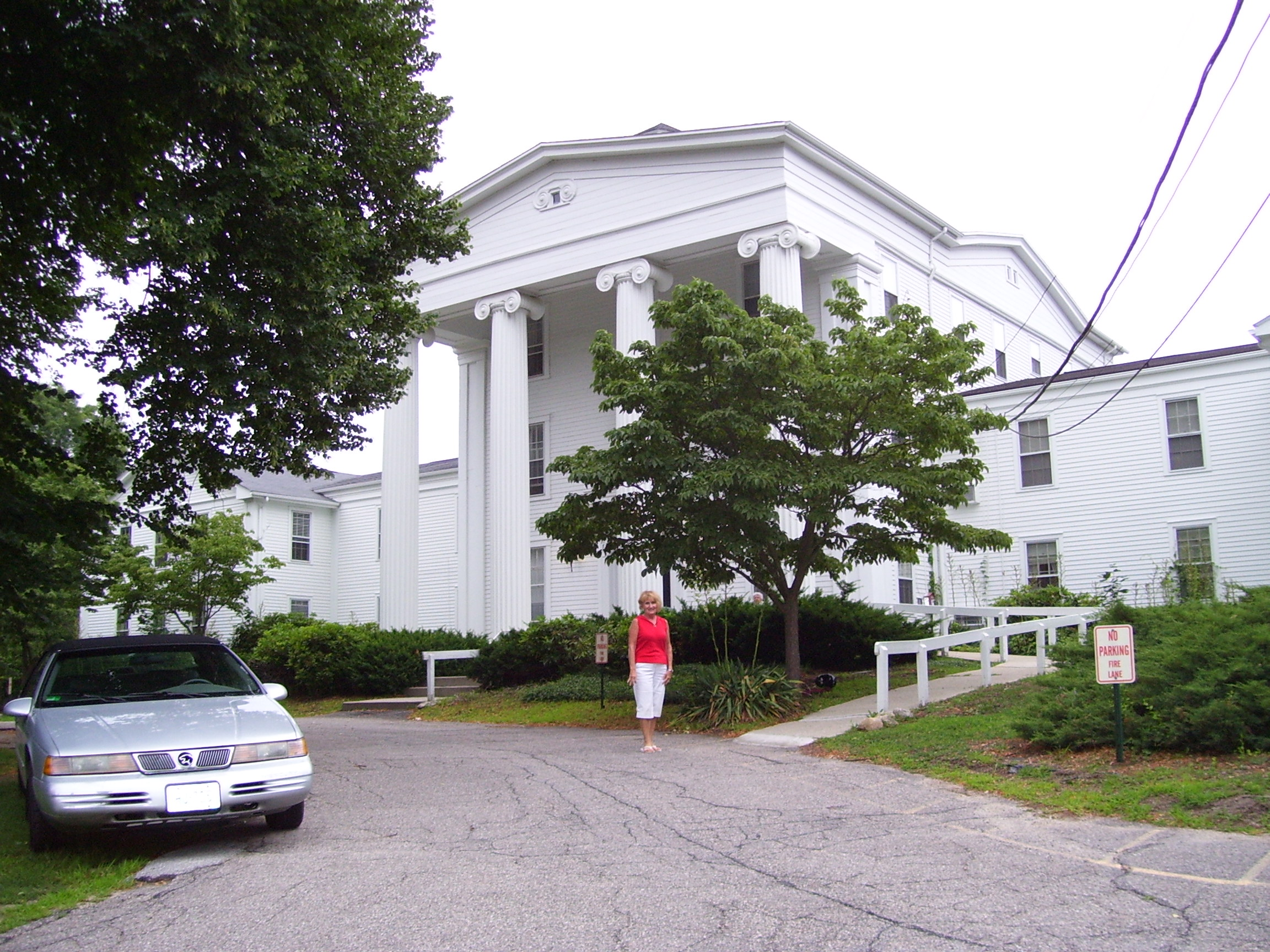
- Smithville Seminary building in 2008

- Location within Rhode Island Location within the United States
- Location: 29 Institute Ln., Scituate, Rhode Island
- Coordinates: 41.8342°N 71.5830°W
- Built: 1839
- Architect: Russell Warren (architect)
- Architectural style: Greek Revival
- Part of: Smithville-North Scituate (ID79000003)
- NRHP reference No.: 78003446

Significant dates
- Added to NRHP: March 29, 1978
- Designated CP: August 29, 1979

The Smithville Seminary was a Freewill Baptist institution established in 1839 at the location of the modern Institute Lane in Smithville-North Scituate, Rhode Island. Renamed the Lapham Institute in 1863, it closed in 1876. The site was then used as the campus of the Pentecostal Collegiate Institute, later the Watchman Institute, and then became the Scituate Commons apartments. It was placed on the National Register of Historic Places in 1978.

== Campus ==
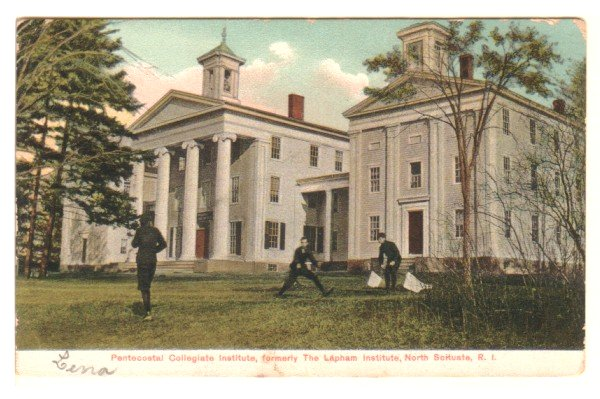
The Pentecostal Collegiate Institute in North Scituate, 1905.

The buildings on the knoll were built in 1839 and comprised a large three-story central building with columns and two wings. The wings, with 33 rooms each, were separated by 20 feet from the main building and connected to it via two-story covered passageways. The central building housed classrooms, offices, staff apartments, and dining facilities, a library and reading room on the second floor, and a large room on the third floor which might serve as a chapel, while the other two buildings served as separate male and female dormitories. The two-mile-long Lake Moswansicut could be seen from the third-floor chapel. The buildings were designed by Russell Warren, the leading Greek Revival architect in New England in the 20th century,

After the close of the renamed Lapham Institute, the campus became the site of the Pentecostal Collegiate Institute from 1902 to 1919 and, eventually, the Watchman Institute in 1923.

The site became part of the National Register of Historic Places in 1978. The buildings were also renovated in the 1970s and converted into apartments known as Scituate Commons.

== History ==
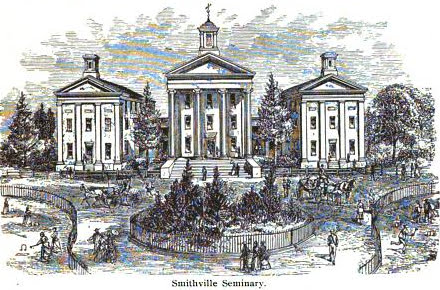
Smithville Seminary in the 1800s

Smithville Seminary was founded in 1839 by the Rhode Island Association of Free Baptists. At the time, the Free Baptists already had two academies, one in New Hampshire (the New Hampton Institute), the other in Maine (Parsonsfield Seminary), and the Rhode Island Baptists desired to have one of their own. Reverend Hiram Brooks was asked to start the school, and raised $20,000, all of which he put toward buildings. The entire commitment of these monies to brick and mortar rather than an endowment fund may have caused financial difficulties for the institution, as it was unable to support itself through tuition revenue.

The first principal was Rev. Hosea Quimby, who had come from the Maine academy to serve at Smithville. Quimby worked for the school, even buying the property when financial trouble struck, until it closed temporarily in 1854 with only 20 students (in 1845, it had an enrollment of over 300 representing 7 U.S. states). It was revived the next year when Quimby rented the property to a Samuel P. Coburn, who became principal, and enrollment again reached over 100 that year. The property was sold to Reverend W. Colgrove in 1857, who operated it for another two years before it closed again, this time for three years.

The site of Henry Barnard’s first Rhode Island Teachers Institute in 1845, the school began giving normal instruction for teachers with public funding in 1867, but ceased in 1871 when the state's Education Commissioner re-established the Rhode Island Normal School and cut program funding for other institutions.

In 1863 the school changed hands and changed its name after a minister and former professor at the school, returned in 1861 to find much of the campus dilapidated and in disrepair. With the Free Baptist Association unwilling or unable to help, William Winsor recruited Congressman Benedict Lapham, after whom the new Lapham Institute was named.

In addition to its connections to what would later become Rhode Island College, the school had connections to Bates College in Maine, another Free Baptist institution. Its first principal, Benjamin F. Hayes, was called to a professorship at Bates, and his successor, Thomas L. Angell, was also called to a professorship there after two years as principal in North Scituate. George H. Ricker then took over as principal for seven years before being called to Hillsdale College in Michigan in 1874. His successor was Arthur G. Moulton, a trustee of Bates, who died just over a year after taking the position. He was followed as principal by W.S. Stockbridge, under whom the school finally closed in 1876. William Winsor was the last benefactor of the institute, and when no one replaced him, the school went bankrupt without an endowment to support it. In 1883 Winsor donated the library of the Lapham Institute to the Greenville Public Library.

== Notable alumni ==
- James Burrill Angell, President of the University of Michigan, University of Vermont
- Thomas L. Angell, Professor at Bates College
- Lewis Boss, astronomer, director of Dudley Observatory
- George T. Day, pastor, writer, professor
- Henry Howard, Governor of Rhode Island 1873-1875
- Oscar Lapham, U.S. Congressman

== See also ==
- National Register of Historic Places listings in Providence County, Rhode Island
