= Edward C. Hayes =

American sociologist

Edward Cary Hayes (1868–1928) was a pioneer in American sociology and was a founder and president of the American Sociological Association.

Edward Cary Hayes was born on February 10, 1868, in Lewiston, Maine, to Professor Benjamin Francis Hayes. He received a bachelor's degree from Bates College and then studied at the Cobb Divinity School. He then became a pastor in Augusta, Maine until 1896 (his views clashed with the congregation) when he became a Dean at Keuka College. In 1899 he enrolled at the University of Chicago to study philosophy but soon began to study sociology. He studied under Albion Small and alongside George Herbert Mead, John Dewey and James Tufts. Hayes then spent a year in Germany at the University of Berlin, where he studied with Georg Schmoller, Adolph Wagner, Friedrich Paulsen, Alfred Vierkandt and Georg Simmel. Hayes was one of the pioneers promoting in bringing sociology into the American educational system. He received his doctorate in 1902. Colby-Bates-Bowdoin Chase Regatta

Hayes went on to teach at Miami University in Oxford, Ohio and the University of Illinois. He wrote many books and articles including, Introduction to the Study of Sociology (1915) and Sociology and Ethics (1921). Hayes attended the first meeting of the American Sociological Association in 1905 and became one of its most influential founding members. He served on the Society's Committee of Ten, selected to create a universal model for schools’ undergraduate introductory sociology courses. Hayes was elected Second Vice President of the American Sociological Association in 1919, First Vice President in 1920, and became its eleventh President in 1921. He died in Urbana, Illinois, in 1928.

== References and external links ==
- Kivisto, Peter. 2000. “Hayes, Edward Cary.” American National Biography Online. American Council of Learned Societies: Oxford University Press, Retrieved March 14, 2003.
- Sutherland, E. H. (1929). "Edward Cary Hayes, 1868–1928". American Journal of Sociology. 35 (1): 93–99. doi:10.1086/214920. S2CID 143941605.
- American Sociological Association
