= Ivory Quinby House =

Historic house in Illinois, United States

- U.S. National Register of Historic Places
- Location within Illinois Location within the United States
- Location: 605 N. 6th St., Monmouth, Illinois
- Coordinates: 40°55′1″N 90°38′52″W
- Built: 1867
- Architect: John C. Cochrane
- Architectural style: Italianate-Greek Revival
- NRHP reference No.: 80001415
- Added to NRHP: November 20, 1980

Portrait depicting Ivory Quinby, a politician and businessman from Monmouth, Illinois, who helped found Monmouth College and owned the Peoria & Oquawka Railroad Company.

The Ivory Quinby House is an Italianate and Greek Revival estate built by architect John C. Cochrane for Ivory Quinby (1817–1869), a prominent Monmouth, Illinois citizen. Quinby, who was an early benefactor and a founder of Monmouth College, also helped the city of Monmouth become the transportation center it is today, by bringing the Peoria and Oquawka Railroad through town in the early 1850s. The National Register of Historic Places property has been owned by Monmouth College since 1965.

== History ==
In 1862, Quinby set aside a plot of land on the corner of East Euclid Avenue and 6th Street, which was located on a large section of property he had donated to the city for the purpose of expansion and improvement. He had surveyed the area and determined it was the highest point in Monmouth. Quinby had owned a number of houses in Monmouth but wanted something larger. In 1866, Quinby contacted noted Chicago architect John C. Cochrane (who would go on to design the Iowa State Capitol), who designed the home. Construction was completed in 1867. Records indicate indoor plumbing was installed as late as 1901. The house stayed in the Quinby family until 1965, when it was deeded to Monmouth College, reflecting the family's long-standing ties with the college for 112 years. The estate currently serves as the home of the college President. The house was added to the National Register of Historic Places on November 20, 1980.

== Renovations ==
A large two-story front porch and bay window was added in the early 1890s.

By 1996, the Quinby House had become run down, and was in need of renovation. An estimate of the cost of such an undertaking was $500,000. Ivory Quinby III, who deeded the home to Monmouth College in 1965, stipulated that if the home was left vacant for more than two years, it was to be razed. Since the mansion was becoming increasingly unlivable, funds were raised by the college, and the home was completely renovated from 1996 to 1997. Windows were replaced (many with the original glass panes), gas light fixtures were wired for electricity, and the original steam heating system was replaced. The house had also been outfitted with a marble coal-burning fireplace, which was kept intact, but non-functioning.
