= Benedict Lapham =

American industrialist and philanthropist

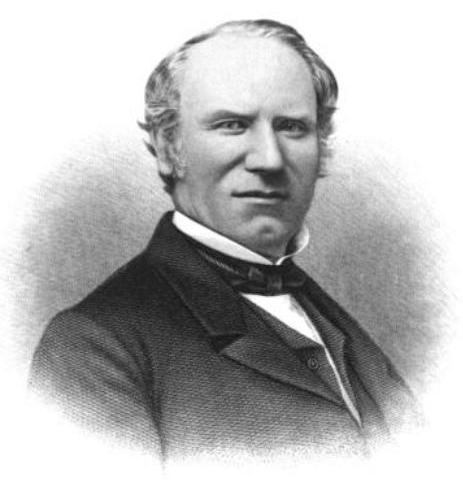
- Born: June 26, 1816; Burrillville, Rhode Island
- Died: June 16, 1883 (aged 66); Centerville, Rhode Island
- Burial place: Swan Point Cemetery
- Occupation: Industrialist
- Spouse: Ann Eliza Austin (m. 1849)

Signature
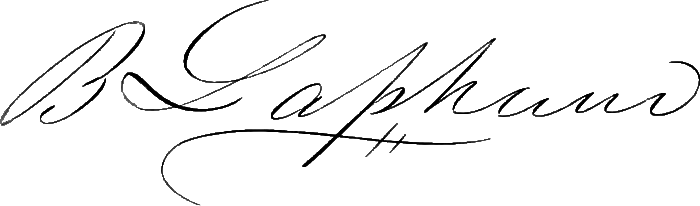

Benedict Lapham (June 26, 1816 – June 16, 1883) was a New England industrialist and philanthropist.

== Biography ==
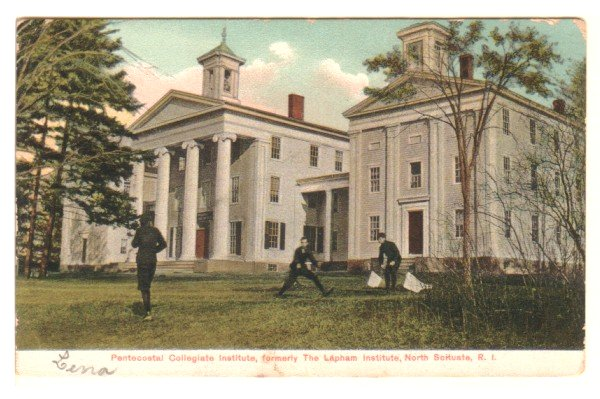
Pentecostal Collegiate Institute at the former Lapham Institute campus in 1905

He was born in Burrillville, Rhode Island to a Yankee family on June 26, 1816. His parents were Phebe Arnold and Reverend Richard Lapham, a farmer, and a minister in the Wesleyan Methodist Church. Lapham farmed before becoming involved in manufacturing in Burrillville, Rhode Island, and Palmer and Douglas, Massachusetts, and he managed a farm for the Albion Manufacturing Company in Smithfield, Rhode Island. Lapham attended Bushee's Academy at Bank Village, Rhode Island studying mechanics and later worked several years as a carpenter and wheelwright. He then worked with the Tillinghast factory in East Greenwich, and the other mills in North Scituate, Centreville, Wallum Pond, Pascoag, and Warwick, Rhode Island.

He married Ann Eliza Austin in November 1849.

Lapham served in the militia during the Dorr Rebellion and was a member of Rhode Island House of Representatives, Rhode Island State Senate, state commissioner of the Antietam Cemetery, president of the town council, Delegate to the 1860 Republican National Convention, justice of the peace. In 1863 he purchased and funded the Smithville Seminary and gave it back to the Free Will Baptist Association. It was renamed the Lapham Institute in his honor, but closed in 1876.

He died at his home in Centerville, Rhode Island on June 16, 1883, and was buried in Swan Point Cemetery.
