= Hosea Quimby =

American Free Will Baptist pastor

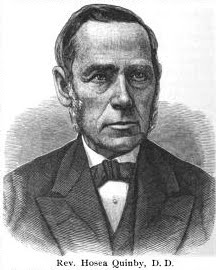
Hosea Quimby Free Will Baptist minister and teacher

Hosea Quimby (also known as Hosea Quinby) (1804–1878) was an American Free Will Baptist pastor, author, and president of the Parsonsfield Seminary in Maine and Smithville Seminary in Rhode Island.

Quimby was born to Moses and Dolly (Atkins) Quimby in 1804. He studied at the New Hampton Institute and Wolfborough Academy from 1824 to 1828 and then graduated from Colby College in 1832. He married Dorothea Burleigh of Sandwich in 1828. Quimby was ordained in Sandwich, New Hampshire, in 1833. He served as the first principal of the Parsonsfield Seminary from 1832 to 1839, and then the Smithville Seminary from 1840 to 1854. He served as pastor in Meredith, New Hampshire, from 1839 to 1840, and from 1855 to 1857 to Pittsfield in 1857. Quinby served as one of the founding trustees of Bates College in Maine. Quimby was pastor and principal of the Free Baptist Academy in Lebanon, Maine, in 1861 to 1864 and Lake Village from 1864 to 1867. He retired from teaching in 1864 and was a chaplain of New Hampshire State Prison from 1869 to 1871. He was pastor in Nottingham, Pittsfield, and Milton Mills from 1876 to 1878. Quimby died in Milton Mills in 1878. Quimby published several works, including a "Review of Butler's Letters," "Treatise on the Faith and Usages of the Free Baptist Denomination," "Prison Chaplaincy and Experiences, 1873" and "Christian Baptism." Quimby's nephew, Ivory Quinby, was one of the earliest benefactors of Monmouth College.
