= Ivory Quinby =

American businessman

- Ivory Quinby
- Born: July 14, 1817; Buxton, Maine, U.S.
- Died: October 23, 1869 (aged 52); Monmouth, Illinois, U.S.
- Education: Colby College
- Occupations: Judge; lawyer; Mayor of Monmouth, Illinois; mercantile owner; owner of the Peoria and Oquawka Railroad Company; banker; city planner
- Known for: Benefactor and founding father of Monmouth College; helped make Monmouth a transportation center
- Spouses: Jane Allen (m. 1839) Mary Pearce (m. 1848)
- Children: 8

Ivory Quinby (July 14, 1817 – October 23, 1869) was an American businessman who was notably one of the earliest benefactors of Monmouth College, and also helped establish Monmouth, Illinois as a transportation center.

== Early life ==
Ivory Quinby I was born on July 14, 1817, in Buxton, Maine. He was named after his mother's former husband, Ivory Fenderson, who had died four years earlier. His parents were Asa and Mehitable (née Milliken) Quinby. He had a brother and sister, named Rodney and Elizabeth. He came from an old New England family, who settled the Massachusetts Bay Colony in 1638. At fifteen, he was enrolled at Waterville College (now Colby College). After graduating on August 3, 1836, with honors, Quinby moved to Parsonsfield, Maine, to live with his uncle Hosea Quinby, where he was employed by Parsonsfield Seminary, a Free Will Baptist academy, as an assistant teacher. Quinby left to study law in Saco, Maine, under Judge Shepley. By the time he was twenty, he traveled to Illinois, with all of his money, which was about $125.00. He arrived in Quincy, Illinois, in 1837, and met two men named John Mitchell and O.H. Browning, who advised that he move to Monmouth, Illinois, for the purpose of buying up land patents. The U.S. Government at the time granted land patents to veterans of the War of 1812, who rarely kept them. Instead, they sold the property to people like Quinby and a colleague of his, Elijah Winslow, who then resold the land to settlers. Quinby and Mitchell walked fifteen miles from Oquawka, Illinois to Monmouth, and established a law firm. With his remaining savings, Quinby bought 8,000 acres in Warren County.

== Civil service career ==
In 1839, Mehitable, Rodney and Elizabeth Quinby moved to Monmouth, where Rodney studied law under both his brother and Abner Clark Harding, who was a partner in the firm Harding & Quinby. In 1849, Quinby was elected to a probate court as a judge, where he served a single term from 1849 to 1853. During this time, Quinby was elected to the board of trustees of Monmouth, which governed the town before the more common single mayoral system was instated. On May 14, 1851, an election was held at the Monmouth courthouse. Charles Armsby, Hiram Baldwin, Chancy Hardin, James Thompson and Ivory Quinby were all elected to the Board. On March 28 of that year, Quinby was elected president of the board. Board of trustees meetings were held in the offices of Harding & Quinby at the time. While serving as president, Quinby and the board strengthened ordinances against drinking and disorderly conduct. When his term came to a close, Quinby was paid $5.00 for his time as president. In 1857, Quinby was elected mayor for a second time, running on the Democratic ticket. He won over his opponents, G. W. Savage and Samuel Wood, by 120 votes. As mayor, Quinby worked with Chancy Hardin, who had become an alderman, serving with James Neil, Theodore Cornell and Horatio Henry. On June 2, 1863, Quinby was elected to the board of health, again with Hardin and a health officer, Dr. J. R. Webster. Quinby also was one of the founders of the Monmouth Public Library, which he began in 1867 as a reading room, which could be used without charge. This eventually became the permanent library. Since he owned acres of land around Monmouth, Quinby donated a section to the city, for the purpose of expansion, which he gifted in 1865. In 1867, after being elected mayor again, Quinby oversaw the placement of sidewalks in Monmouth. One parcel was set aside, and turned into a park, which takes up an entire block. It has remained a park, into the present day.

== Business ==
Ivory Quinby was not only a respected politician, but a very successful businessman. He founded the Harding & Quinby law firm (as previously mentioned), and operated a mercantile in nearby Berwick from 1847 to 1851. He frequently bought and sold property in Monmouth, which generated a financially successful business. On February 27, 1851, prominent Monmouth citizens Abner Harding, Wyatt B. Stapp (after whom Wyatt Earp was named), Colonel J.W. Davidson, and James G. Madden held a public meeting to discuss a proposed measure, which would allow the Peoria and Oquawka Railroad Company to lay track through town. This was an idea that Quinby fervently supported. The public response was generally positive, so the project moved ahead. Quinby purchased land for the railroad to pass through, and he along with Chancy Hardin and Abner Harding formed a construction company, C. Hardin & Co., and began the task of laying track. Unfortunately, the citizens of Oquawka were not as enthusiastic, and refused to aid in the construction or funding. They did not see the railroad as a serious competitor of river traffic. The Peoria & Oquawka was forced to divert their planned route to Burlington, where the bankrupted Peoria & Warsaw Railroad had already begun work. Quinby's business sense greatly helped the Railroad, and made it very profitable. The railroad was eventually sold to the Central Military Tract Railroad in 1852, which eventually became the Chicago, Burlington and Quincy. This route is still used to this day, mostly traveled by coal trains and Amtrak. Through Quinby's foresight, Monmouth, Illinois is today a transportation center.

In 1856, Quinby decided to shift from practicing law to banking, and partnered with T. L. McCoy, founding the Warren County Bank, which was the first in town. The bank's success, coupled with his other business ventures, made Quinby wealthy.

== Monmouth College ==
Quinby highly valued education, and so when Monmouth College was founded in 1853, he became a member of its Board of Trustees, where he served as treasurer. Quinby was one of the college's earliest benefactors, and donated a large amount of money, a sum which amounted to about $10,000. A metal plaque in Wallace Hall at Monmouth College describes Quinby as "One whose loyalty and benevolence helped make Monmouth College."

== Personal life ==
Quinby married Jane Allen, who had moved from Oneida County, New York, with her father Benjamin Allen, in 1839. They had three children, Arthur, Henry and Willis, all of whom died before their father. Allen died of tuberculosis in 1847. Quinby moved to Berwick shortly after Allen's death to begin his mercantile business, and met Mary Pearce, whom he married in 1848. He had five more children, bringing the total to eight.

In 1866, Quinby decided to build a larger home than the others he had owned in Monmouth. Quinby set aside a plot of land on the corner of East Euclid and North 6th Street, which he had surveyed as early as 1862. He contacted noted Chicago architect John C. Cochrane, who designed a large two-story Italianate-Greek Revival mansion, now known as the Ivory Quinby House. The Quinby family deeded the estate to Monmouth College in 1965, under the condition that it be returned if the college no longer sees use for it. It was listed on the National Register of Historic Places in 1980. It is currently the residence of the Monmouth College President.
