= Dr. Samuel Quimby House =

Historic house in Maine, United States

- U.S. National Register of Historic Places
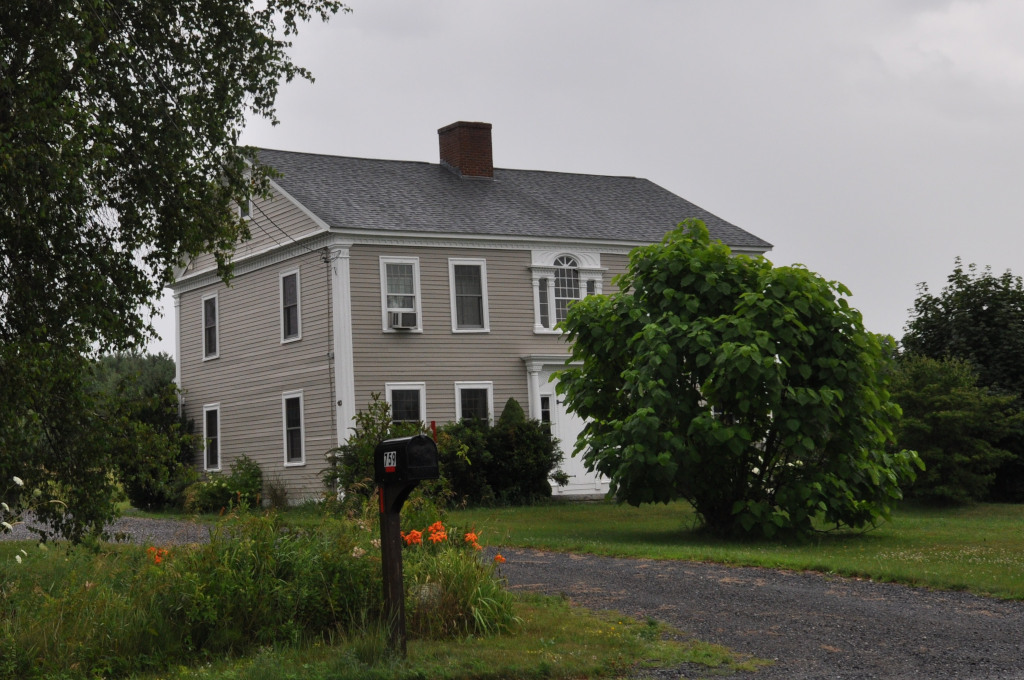

- Location within Maine
- Location: North Rd., Mount Vernon, Maine
- Coordinates: 44°25′49″N 69°56′19″W
- Area: 1 acre (0.40 ha)
- Built: 1800
- Architectural style: Federal
- NRHP reference No.: 90001903
- Added to NRHP: December 18, 1990

The Dr. Samuel Quimby House is a historic house on North Road in southern Mount Vernon, Maine. Built about 1800 for the area's first doctor, it is an unusually elaborate expression of folk Federal period architecture in a rural setting. It was listed on the National Register of Historic Places in 1990.

== Description and history ==
The Quimby House stands on the north side of North Road (also known as Cobbs Hill Road), in southern Mount Vernon, a rural community northwest of Augusta. The house is a 2 1/2-story wood-frame structure, with a gabled roof, central chimney, clapboarded exterior, and a modern concrete foundation. The main facade faces south, and is five bays wide, with corner pilasters, and a central entrance with a Palladian window above. The entrance has flanking sidelights and pilasters, with a multilight half-oval transom window topped by a projecting cornice. The side windows of the Palladian trio are also flanked by pilasters with entablatures and cornices above. The cornice below the front roofline is styled in a similar fashion to the Palladian window, and carries around to the sides. The interior follows a typical center-chimney plan, with a narrow entry vestibule containing a winding staircase, and parlors to either side of the chimney. The staircase has a distinctively carved rail, and scalloped ornamentation on the outer string.

The exact construction date of the house is not known. The land on which it stands was purchased in 1797, and local tradition holds that it was built about 1800 for him by one of his patients (whose identity is unknown). The house was originally covered by a hip roof, which was blown off by a windstorm in 1950. The house was owned for many years by members of the Currier and Clough families. New owners in 1986 moved the house back from its original site to a new foundation, and undertook its restoration.

== See also ==
- National Register of Historic Places listings in Kennebec County, Maine
