= National Register of Historic Places listings in Foster, Rhode Island =

This is a list of Registered Historic Places in Foster, Rhode Island.

Contents: Counties in Rhode Island

Bristol | Kent | Newport | Providence (Pawtucket | Providence (city) | Woonsocket) | Washington

This National Park Service list is complete through NPS recent listings posted April 17, 2026.

	Name on the Register	Image	Date listed	Location	City or town	Description
1	Borders Farm	Borders Farm	July 29, 2009 (#09000576)	31-38 N. Rd. 41°47′17″N 71°44′38″W	Foster	
2	Breezy Hill Site (RI-957)		September 28, 1985 (#85002700)	Address Restricted	Foster	
3	Clayville Historic District	Clayville Historic District	December 29, 1988 (#88003079)	Roughly bounded by Cole Ave., Plainfield Pike, Field Hill Rd., and Victory Highway; 41°46′37″N 71°40′35″W	Foster and Scituate	
4	Capt. George Dorrance House	Capt. George Dorrance House	March 16, 1972 (#72000039)	2 Jencks Rd. 41°44′22″N 71°47′12″W	Foster	
5	Foster Center Historic District	Foster Center Historic District	May 11, 1974 (#74000050)	Foster; 41°47′07″N 71°43′18″W	Foster	
6	Moosup Valley Historic District	Moosup Valley Historic District	May 11, 1988 (#88000521)	Roughly bounded by Harrington, Johnson, Moosup Valley and Barb Hill, and Cucumber Hill Rds. 41°44′25″N 71°45′23″W	Foster	
7	Mt. Hygeia	Mt. Hygeia	August 12, 1977 (#77000008)	Mt. Hygeia Rd. 41°50′48″N 71°45′17″W	Foster	Also known as the Solomon Drown House.
8	Mount Vernon Tavern	Mount Vernon Tavern	May 8, 1974 (#74000001)	199 Plainfield Pike (RI 14); 41°43′51″N 71°42′52″W	Foster	
9	Hopkins Mill Historic District	Hopkins Mill Historic District	May 10, 1984 (#84002013)	Old Danielson Pike, U.S. Route 6, Maple Rock and Rams Trail Rds. 41°49′21″N 71°42′25″W	Foster	Misspelled "Nopkins" in the National Register

== See also ==
- National Register of Historic Places listings in Providence County, Rhode Island
- List of National Historic Landmarks in Rhode Island
