= Hygieia (disambiguation) =

Hygieia, also rendered Hygiea and Hygeia and Hygea and Hygia, may refer to:

- Hygieia, a Greek goddess of health
- 10 Hygiea, the fourth-largest asteroid
- Hygeia (city), a planned utopian community on the Ohio River
- Bowl of Hygieia, the universally accepted sign of pharmacy
- Mount Hygeia, an historic farm in Foster, Rhode Island
- Hygieia, the name of one of the Hesperides
- Hygeia, an epithet of Athena (Ὑγεία Ἀθηνᾶ)

== See also ==
- Hygia, a large genus of Asian seed bugs
- Hygiea (disambiguation)
- Hygiene, a series of practices performed to preserve health
