= Hygiea =

Hygiea may refer to:

- An alternative spelling of Hygieia, the Greek goddess of preventive healthcare/medicine
- The asteroid 10 Hygiea, named after the Greek goddess

== See also ==
- Hygia, a large genus of Asian seed bugs
- Hygieia (disambiguation)
- Hygiene, a series of practices performed to preserve health (the word hygiene is cognate with the name of the Greek goddess Hygieia)
