= List of highest points in Rhode Island by county =

This is a list of highest points in Rhode Island, in alphabetical order by county. All elevations use the North American Vertical Datum of 1988 (NAVD88), the currently accepted vertical control datum for United States, Canada and Mexico. Elevations are from the National Geodetic Survey (NGS) when available. Others are from the United States Geological Survey topographic maps when available. These can be found on the Peakbagger.com web pages. Elevations followed by a plus sign (+) were interpolated by the compiler using topographic map contour lines. The true elevation is between that shown and the elevation plus the contour line interval which is forty feet in most instances. Elevations from the NGS are rounded to the nearest whole number.

County	Name	Height feet / m	Source
Bristol	Mount Hope	217+ / 66+	PB
Kent	Bald Hill	629 / 192	PB
Newport	Pocasset Hill	315+ / 96+	PB
Providence	Jerimoth Hill	812 / 247	PB
Washington	Washington County High Point	560+ / 170+	PB
