= Theodore Foster =

American politician (1752–1828)

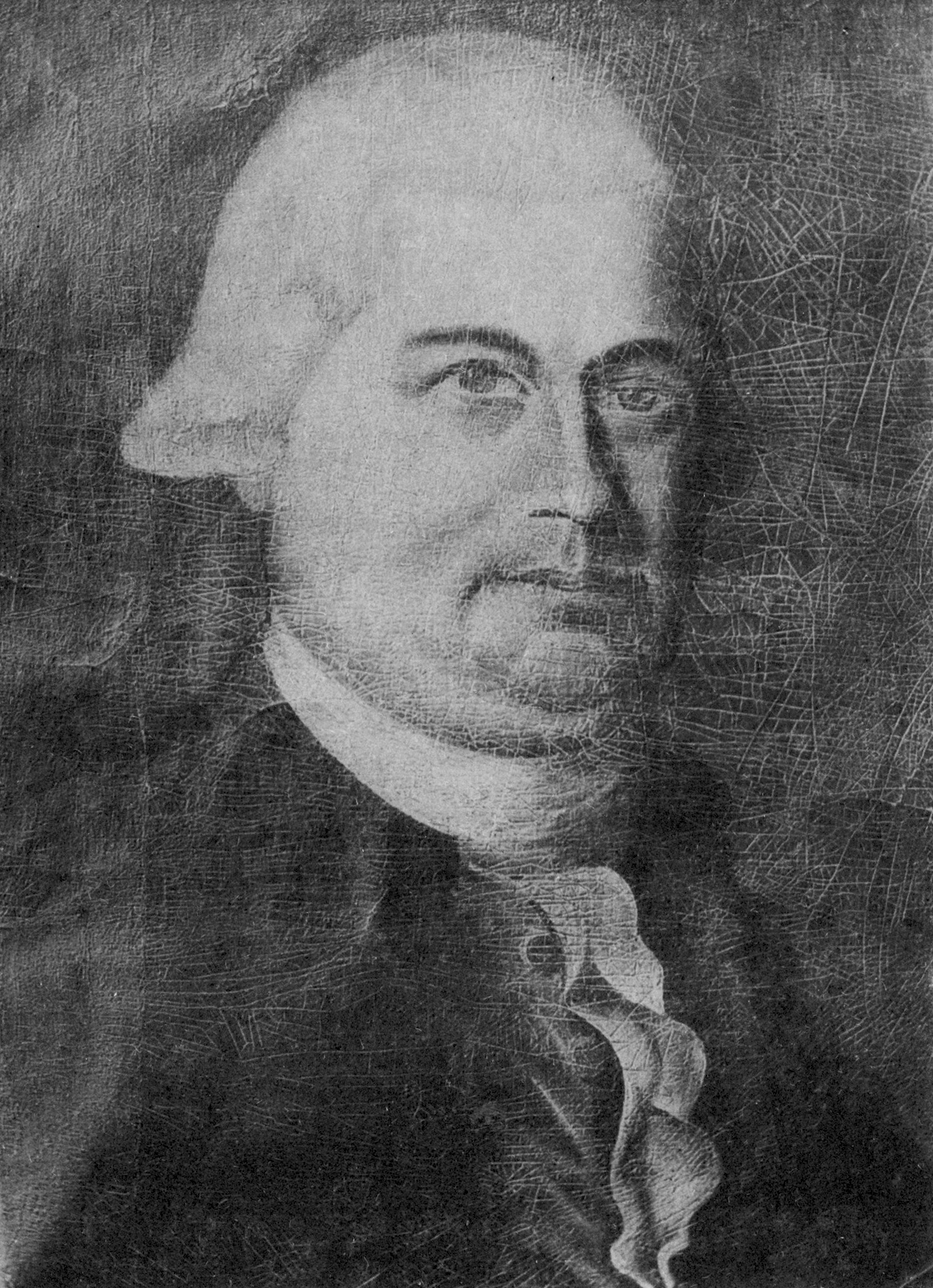

United States Senator from Rhode Island
- In office June 12, 1790 – March 3, 1803
- Preceded by: None
- Succeeded by: Samuel J. Potter

Member of the Rhode Island House of Representatives
- In office 1791; 1797-1803

Personal details
- Born: April 29, 1752 Brookfield, Province of Massachusetts Bay
- Died: January 13, 1828 (aged 75) Providence, Rhode Island, U.S.
- Resting place: Swan Point Cemetery
- Party: Federalist
- Relations: Dwight Foster; Arthur Fenner; Dwight Foster
- Education: Brown University; Dartmouth College

Theodore Foster (April 29, 1752 – January 13, 1828) was an American lawyer and politician from Rhode Island. He was a member of the Federalist Party and later the National Republican Party. He served as one of the first two United States senators from Rhode Island and, following John Langdon, served as dean of the Senate.

== Early life ==
Foster was born in Brookfield, Massachusetts in 1752. He engaged in classical studies at the college in the English Colony of Rhode Island and Providence Plantations (now known as Brown University), graduating in 1770. He then studied law and lived with fellow student Solomon Drowne. He was admitted to the bar association in 1771 and remained in Rhode Island to practice law, beginning his law practice in Providence. He was town clerk in Providence from 1775 to 1787. He earned his master's degree from Dartmouth College in 1786.

Foster was a protege of Brown University's first chancellor, Chief Justice of Rhode Island and Providence Plantations and revolutionary patriot Stephen Hopkins. Foster married the sister of the future governor of Rhode Island and Providence Plantations Arthur Fenner.

== American Revolution ==
Foster played a role in the Gaspee Affair of 1772, along with John Brown and others, which helped catalyze events leading to up to the American Revolutionary War. Foster distinguished himself as a staunch supporter of General George Washington and the Federalist cause.

== Later life ==
Until 1790 Foster held various positions in the government of Rhode Island. He was then elected to the United States Senate, beginning his service on June 12, 1790. Rhode Island's state legislature re-elected him in 1791 and 1797, and he served until March 3, 1803, when he retired from public life to engage in writing and historical research. He was elected a member of the American Antiquarian Society in 1820. Foster became a passionate collector of numerous documents relating to colonial Providence. He helped found the Rhode Island Historical Society in 1822. Foster's heirs sold his extensive collection of historical documents to the Society in 1833. Many of these documents are unpublished.

During the latter period, Foster also served as a trustee of Brown University. Foster returned to public life to serve in the Rhode Island state legislature from 1812 to 1816. He lived in the town of Foster, Rhode Island, which was named after him. When Solomon Drowne moved back to Rhode Island he lived on a farm (Mt. Hygeia) next to Foster's.

Foster died on January 13, 1828, and is interred in Swan Point Cemetery in Providence.

== Family life ==
Foster's father was Massachusetts Supreme Judicial Court Justice Jedediah Foster, who graduated from Harvard University in 1744.

Foster was the elder brother of Senator Dwight Foster of Massachusetts, and the great-uncle of Massachusetts Attorney General and Massachusetts Supreme Judicial Court Justice Dwight Foster.

U.S. Senate
Preceded by (none)	U.S. senator (Class 1) from Rhode Island; 1790–1803; Served alongside: Joseph Stanton, Jr., William Bradford, Ray Greene, Christopher Ellery	Succeeded by Samuel J. Potter
