= Rhode Island Greening =

Apple cultivar

Malus domestica 'Rhode Island Greening'
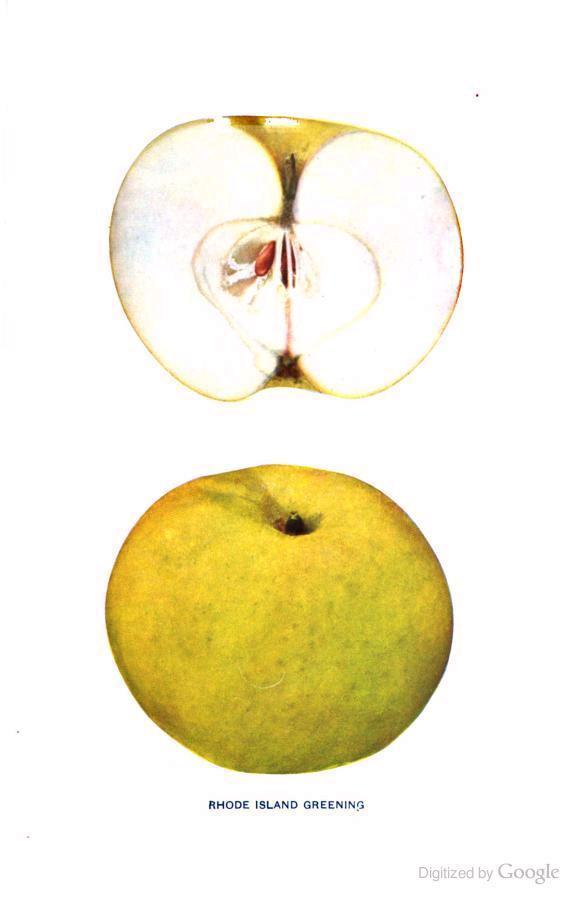
- Cultivar: 'Rhode Island Greening'
- Origin: about 1650, Newport, Rhode Island, USA

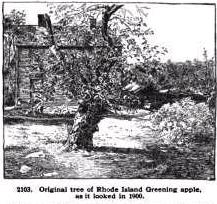
Early Rhode Island Greening apple tree (200 years old) in Foster, Rhode Island, pictured about 1900

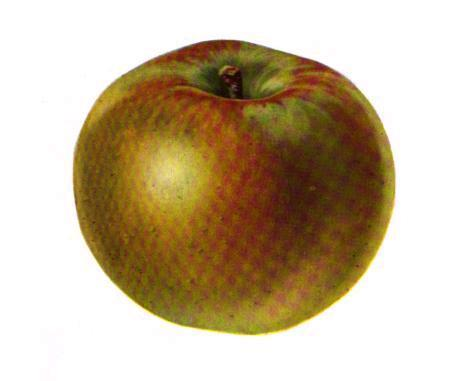
'Rhode Island Greening', pictured in 1913

The 'Rhode Island Greening' is an American apple variety and the official fruit of the state of Rhode Island.

== History ==
The Rhode Island Greening originated around 1650 near Green's End in Middletown, Rhode Island. The first Greenings were grown by a Mr. Green who operated a tavern and developed apple trees from seed. He gave many scions from the tree to visitors for grafting elsewhere, and the original tree subsequently died. The apples became known as "Green's Inn" apples from Rhode Island. One of the oldest surviving trees was located on the Mt. Hygeia farm in Foster, Rhode Island at the turn of the 20th century. The Rhode Island Greening was one of the most popular apples grown in New York in the 19th century.

== Characteristics ==
It is tender, crisp, juicy, and quite tart, and similar to the 'Granny Smith'. It is best suited for baking, though can be fresh eaten after storage. The fruit is large, uniformly round in shape, and flattened on the ends, with a dark, waxy, green skin that turns a greenish-yellow when fully ripe. It ripens from September to October, keeping well into February or longer.
