= Agathyrna =

Scientific classification
- Domain: Eukaryota
- Kingdom: Animalia
- Phylum: Arthropoda
- Class: Insecta
- Order: Hemiptera
- Suborder: Heteroptera
- Family: Coreidae
- Tribe: Colpurini
- Genus: Agathyrna; Stål, 1861

Synonyms
- Agathyrma Walker, 1871

Genus of insects

Agathyrna is a genus of bugs in the tribe Colpurini from Malesia and New Guinea, erected by Carl Stål in 1861.

== Species ==
The Coreoidea Species File lists:

1. Agathyrna ceramica Dolling, 1987
2. Agathyrna concolor Dolling, 1987
3. Agathyrna minor Dolling, 1987
4. Agathyrna praecellens Stål, 1861 - type species
5. Agathyrna venosa Dolling, 1987
