= Wolfius =

Scientific classification
- Kingdom: Animalia
- Phylum: Arthropoda
- Clade: Pancrustacea
- Class: Insecta
- Order: Hemiptera
- Suborder: Heteroptera
- Family: Coreidae
- Subfamily: Coreinae
- Tribe: Colpurini
- Genus: Wolfius; Distant, 1902
- Species: W. exemplificatus

Binomial name
- Wolfius exemplificatus Distant, 1902

Genus of seed bugs

Wolfius is a monotypic genus of bugs in the tribe Colpurini, erected by William Lucas Distant in 1902. It contains the single species Wolfius exemplificatus, recorded from Thailand and Burma.
