= Borders Farm =

- U.S. National Register of Historic Places
- U.S. Historic district
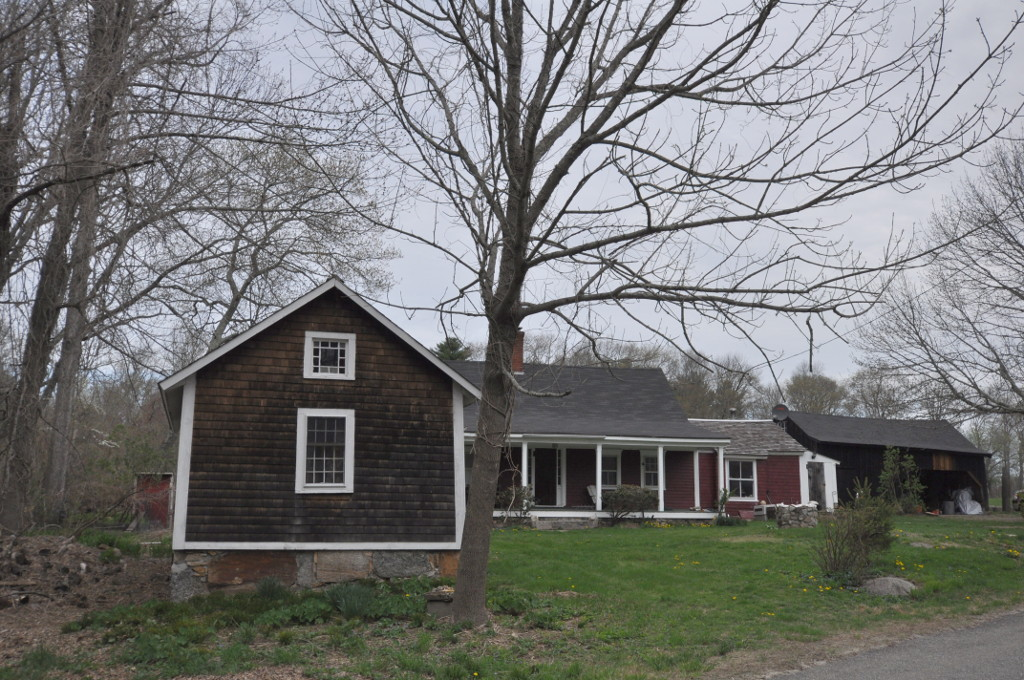

- Location within Rhode Island Location within the United States
- Location: 31-38 N. Rd, Foster, Rhode Island
- Coordinates: 41.78718°N 71.74339°W
- Area: 199.7 acres (80.8 ha)
- Built: 1840
- Built by: George Phillips
- Architectural style: Federal
- NRHP reference No.: 09000576
- Added to NRHP: July 29, 2009

The Borders Farm is a historic farm district at 31-38 North Road in Foster, Rhode Island. It includes two adjacent farms, covering nearly 200 acres (81 ha) of land. The George Phillips Farm, located at 31 North Road, includes an 18th-century house and several outbuildings dating to the 19th and early 20th centuries, as well as the foundational remnants of several older structures. The Allen Hill Farm, whose late-18th century house is located at 41 North Road, includes a second house adjacent to the first, as well as a carriage shed, barn, and farm shed, all of 19th-century origin with some 20th-century alterations. Although the two farms were long in separate families, they were acquired by the Borders family and combined into a single operation in the mid-20th century.

The district was added to the National Register of Historic Places in 2009.

== See also ==
- National Register of Historic Places listings in Providence County, Rhode Island
