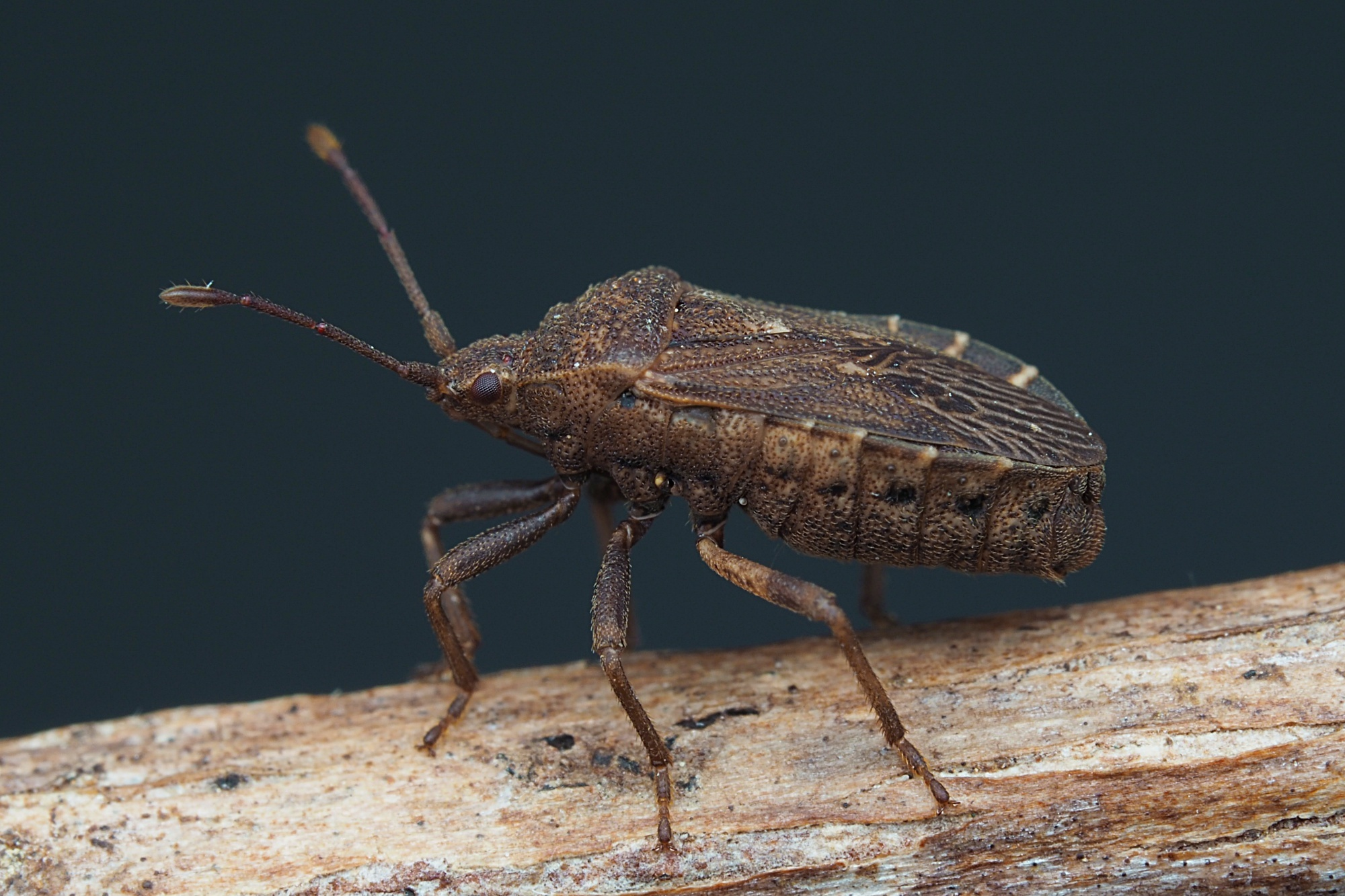
- Acantholybas brunneus in Kaeo, New Zealand

Scientific classification
- Domain: Eukaryota
- Kingdom: Animalia
- Phylum: Arthropoda
- Class: Insecta
- Order: Hemiptera
- Suborder: Heteroptera
- Family: Coreidae
- Subfamily: Coreinae
- Tribe: Colpurini; Breddin, 1900

Synonyms
- Agathyrini Breddin, 1906; Agathyrnaria Breddin, 1906; Hygiinae Kirkaldy, 1902; Lybantaria Stål, 1871; Lybantina Stål, 1871; Lybantini Stål, 1871; Pachycephalini Breddin, 1900

= Colpurini =

Tribe of true bugs

The Colpurini are a tribe of leaf-footed bugs, in the subfamily Coreinae erected (as a subfamily) by Gustav Breddin in 1900. Genera are distributed from India, South-East Asia through to Australia and New Zealand. The tribe name (type) is based on Colpura Bergroth: now a subgenus of Hygia.

== Genera ==
The Coreoidea Species File lists:

1. Acantholybas Breddin, 1899
2. Acanthotyla Stål, 1873
3. Acarihygia Brailovsky, 1993
4. Agathyrna Stål, 1861
5. Ashlockhygia Brailovsky & Ortega Leon, 1994
6. Astacops Boisduval, 1835
7. Ballhygia Brailovsky & Ortega Leon, 1994
8. Baumannhygia Brailovsky, 1996
9. Brachylybas Stål, 1871
10. Brachylybastella Brailovsky, 1995
11. Buruhygia Brailovsky, 1993
12. Calyptohygia Brailovsky, 1998
13. Carayonhygia Brailovsky, 2002
14. Carvalhygia Brailovsky, 1995
15. Cephalohygia Brailovsky, 2004
16. Eludohygia Brailovsky, 1996
17. Grosshygia Brailovsky, 1993
18. Grosshygioides Brailovsky, 1993
19. Halohygia Brailovsky & Barrera, 2004
20. Heisshygia Brailovsky, 1993
21. Heydonhygia Brailovsky & Barrera, 2005
22. Homalocolpura Breddin, 1900
23. Hygia Uhler, 1861
24. Kekihygia Brailovsky, 1994
25. Kerzhnerhygia Brailovsky, 1993
26. Kinabaluhygia Brailovsky, 1996
27. Lobogonius Stål, 1871
28. Lothygia Brailovsky, 1994
29. Lygaeopharus Stål, 1871
30. Missimhygia Brailovsky, 1993
31. Monasavuhygia Brailovsky, 1996
32. Neohalohygia Brailovsky & Barrera, 2004
33. Neosciophyrus Brailovsky, 2003
34. Nepiohygia Brailovsky, 2003
35. Nishihygia Brailovsky, 2000
36. Pachycolpura Breddin, 1900
37. Pachycolpuroides Brailovsky, 1993
38. Panstronhygia Brailovsky & Barrera, 2000
39. Riedelhygia Brailovsky & Barrera, 2005
40. Salgohygia Brailovsky & Barrera, 2004
41. Schaeferhygia Brailovsky & Ortega Leon, 1994
42. Sciophyrella Brailovsky & Barrera, 1996
43. Sciophyritides Brailovsky & Barrera, 1996
44. Sciophyroides Brailovsky & Barrera, 1996
45. Sciophyropsis Brailovsky & Barrera, 1996
46. Sciophyrus Stål, 1873
47. Scioriedeli Brailovsky, 2004
48. Sibuyanhygia Brailovsky, 1997
49. Sohnhygia Brailovsky, 2003
50. Sulawsihygia Brailovsky, 2000
51. Tachycolpura Breddin, 1900
52. Typhlocolpura Breddin, 1900
53. Ullrihygia Brailovsky & Barrera, 2003
54. Vittorius Distant, 1902
55. Warishygia Brailovsky, 2003
56. Weirhygia Brailovsky, 2001
57. Wolfius Distant, 1902
58. Woodwardhygia Brailovsky, 1993
59. Wygohygia Brailovsky, 1993
60. Xanthocolpura Breddin, 1900
61. Yasunahygia Brailovsky, 2003
