= Solomon Drowne =

American physician

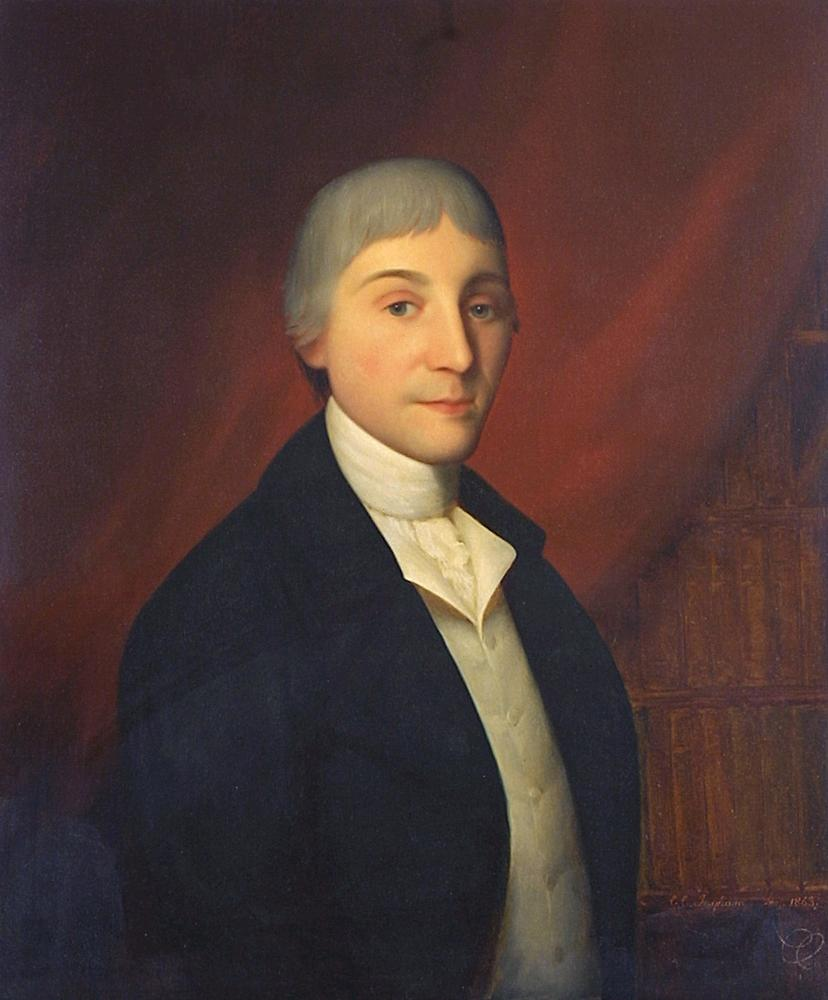
- Born: March 11, 1753; Providence, Colony of Rhode Island and Providence Plantations
- Died: February 5, 1834 (aged 80); Foster, Rhode Island, U.S.
- Education: Brown University
- Occupations: Physician, surgeon

Dr. Solomon Drowne (also known as Solomon Drown) (March 11, 1753 – February 5, 1834) was a prominent American medical doctor, academic and surgeon during the American Revolution and in the history of the fledgling United States.

== Early life ==
Drowne was born in Providence, Rhode Island in 1753. His father (also named Solomon, as was his father) was a merchant and was heavily involved in the civic affairs of the town. The Drowne family was also active in the First Baptist Church in America. Drowne's great-uncle Shem Drowne made the famous grasshopper weather vane atop of Faneuil Hall in Boston. In 1772, Drown witnessed the burning of a British ship in an event known as the Gaspée Affair. The following year, he graduated from the College in the English Colony of Rhode Island and Providence Plantations (the original name for Brown University) and received medical degrees from Dartmouth College and the College of Philadelphia (now the University of Pennsylvania).

== American Revolutionary War ==
From 1776 to 1780, during the Revolutionary War, Drowne served as a surgeon in different hospitals and with different regiments throughout the Continental Army. On July 3, 1776, he narrowly escaped being captured by the British while gathering medical supplies in New York City.

While stationed and treating soldiers at Rhode Island, he gained the favor of Marquis de Lafayette, the Comte de Rochambeau, the Comte d'Estaing and other French military officers supporting the American cause. In autumn 1780, he became surgeon on board the privateer sloop Hope owned by Joseph Nightingale and John Innis Clarke, keeping a diary that was later published. Drowne was discharged from the 1st Rhode Island Regiment on June 15, 1783, receiving a Badge of Merit for six years' faithful service.

== After the war ==
In 1783, Drowne was elected to the Brown University (then still known as the College in the English Colony of Rhode Island and Providence Plantations ) board of fellows. He traveled to Europe, touring various medical facilities and schools and meeting Benjamin Franklin and Thomas Jefferson in Paris. Returning home, he practiced medicine in Providence, Rhode Island until 1788, when he settled in Marietta, Ohio with other war veterans. He was elected a Fellow of the American Academy of Arts and Sciences in 1790.

As his health declined, Drowne moved from Marietta to Morgantown, Virginia (now West Virginia), Union, Pennsylvania and back to Rhode Island in 1801.

== Later life ==
Drowne was a close friend of U.S. Senator Theodore Foster, whom he had met at college. In 1801 Drowne returned to Rhode Island and bought a farm next to Senator Foster in Foster, Rhode Island naming his farm Mt. Hygeia after the Greek goddess of health. Drowne used the farm for botanical research and named his driveway the "Appian Way". (As near as can be determined, Drown's home was built around 1806 as determined by Anselyn Lynch researching for the National Register of Historic Places - the house is on the Register). The first honorary Doctor of Medicine degree from Brown Medical School was conferred upon Solomon Drowne in 1804. In 1811, Drowne was appointed Professor of Botany and Materia Medica in the medical department at Rhode Island College (now Brown University Medical School). He laid out the college's first botanical garden, became one of the original members of the Rhode Island Medical Society and one of the founders of the Rhode Island Society for the Encouragement of Domestic Industry. With his son William Drowne, he co-wrote The Farmer's Guide, a thorough guide on husbandry and gardening, in 1824.

Drowne's papers are now a part of Brown University's collection.

== Quotes ==
The phrase "the whole Fraternity of Noise", describing the growing street noise in Philadelphia's downtown, is often misattributed to Benjamin Franklin, but actually originates in a letter from Drowne to his brother William while Solomon was in Philadelphia in 1774.
