= Hopkins Mill Historic District =

Historic district in Rhode Island, United States

- U.S. National Register of Historic Places
- U.S. Historic district
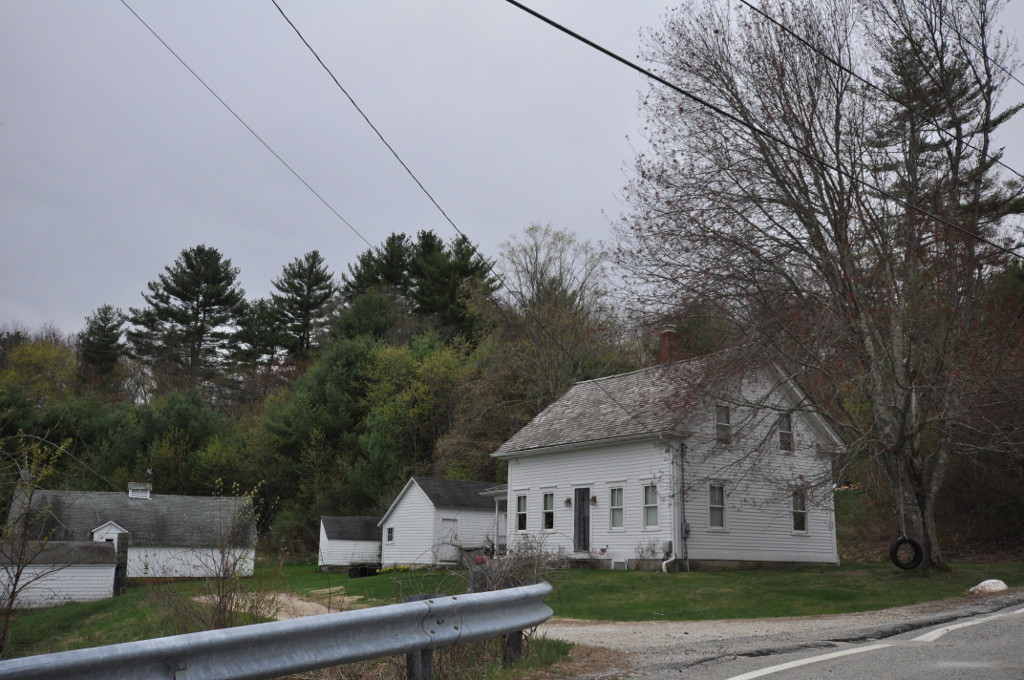

- Location within Rhode Island Location within the United States
- Location: Foster, Rhode Island
- Coordinates: 41°49′21″N 71°42′25″W
- Built: 1720
- Architect: Multiple
- Architectural style: Greek Revival, Italianate, Federal
- NRHP reference No.: 84002013
- Added to NRHP: May 10, 1984

The Hopkins Mill District is a historic district in Foster, Rhode Island. It encompasses a historic mill village that extends along Old Danielson Pike between its two junctions with Danielson Pike (United States Route 6). The area has been the site of mills (at first grist- and sawmills) since the 18th century, and includes one of Foster's oldest houses, the c. 1720 Hopkins-Potter House at 21 Old Danielson Pike. Prominent public buildings in the district include the c. 1830 Curtis Hall at 18 Danielson Pike, which was long used as a tavern and social gathering place, and the 1869-71 Hopkins Falls Union Church. The church is also known as South Foster Union Chapel, It's a one-story Greek Revival building that includes stairs made from granite mined in local quarries.

The district was added to the National Register of Historic Places in 1984, where it is misspelled "Nopkins".

== See also ==
- National Register of Historic Places listings in Providence County, Rhode Island
