= Foster Center, Rhode Island =

- Foster Center Historic District
- U.S. National Register of Historic Places
- U.S. Historic district
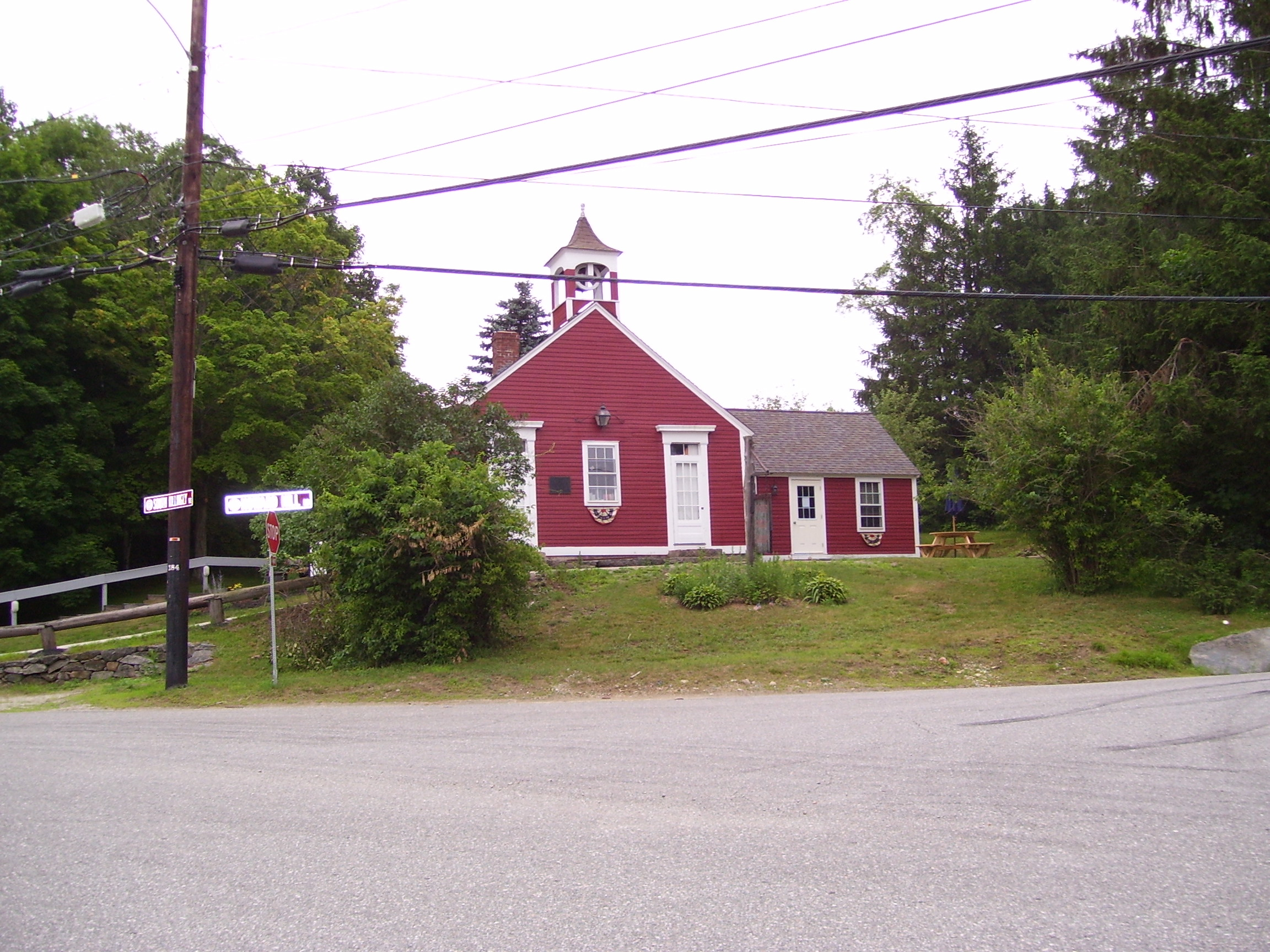
- Foster School House in 2008

- Location within Rhode Island Location within the United States
- Location: Foster, Rhode Island
- Coordinates: 41.7899°N 71.7288°W
- Architectural style: Greek Revival, Colonial
- NRHP reference No.: 74000050
- Added to NRHP: May 11, 1974

Location of the CDP in Providence County and the state of Rhode Island.

Foster Center is a village in the town of Foster, Rhode Island, United States. It was listed as a census-designated place (CDP) in 2010, with a population of 355. Historic elements of the village are included in the Foster Center Historic District, which was added to the National Register of Historic Places on May 11, 1974. The district features various colonial and Greek Revival houses as well as the still functioning town building from the late 18th century.

== Geography ==
According to the U.S. Census Bureau, the CDP has a total area of 2.18 square miles (5.65 km^{2}), of which 2.17 square miles (5.61 km^{2}) is land and 0.015 square miles (0.04 km^{2}), or 0.66%, is water. The village is located near the western border of Rhode Island along Rhode Island Route 94, which leads north to West Glocester and south towards Clayville.

== Demographics ==
=== 2020 census ===
The 2020 United States census counted 333 people, 155 households, and 68 families in Foster Center. The population density was 153.6 per square mile (59.3/km^{2}). There were 157 housing units at an average density of 72.4 per square mile (28.0/km^{2}). The racial makeup was 93.69% (312) white or European American (93.39% non-Hispanic white), 0.3% (1) black or African-American, 0.6% (2) Native American or Alaska Native, 2.1% (7) Asian, 0.0% (0) Pacific Islander or Native Hawaiian, 0.3% (1) from other races, and 3.0% (10) from two or more races. Hispanic or Latino of any race was 0.9% (3) of the population.

Of the 155 households, 21.9% had children under the age of 18; 55.5% were married couples living together; 11.0% had a female householder with no spouse or partner present. 17.4% of households consisted of individuals and 7.1% had someone living alone who was 65 years of age or older. The average household size was 2.5 and the average family size was 3.6. The percent of those with a bachelor's degree or higher was estimated to be 10.8% of the population.

16.5% of the population was under the age of 18, 8.7% from 18 to 24, 17.4% from 25 to 44, 36.0% from 45 to 64, and 21.3% who were 65 years of age or older. The median age was 50.1 years. For every 100 females, the population had 84.0 males. For every 100 females ages 18 and older, there were 95.8 males.

== Images ==
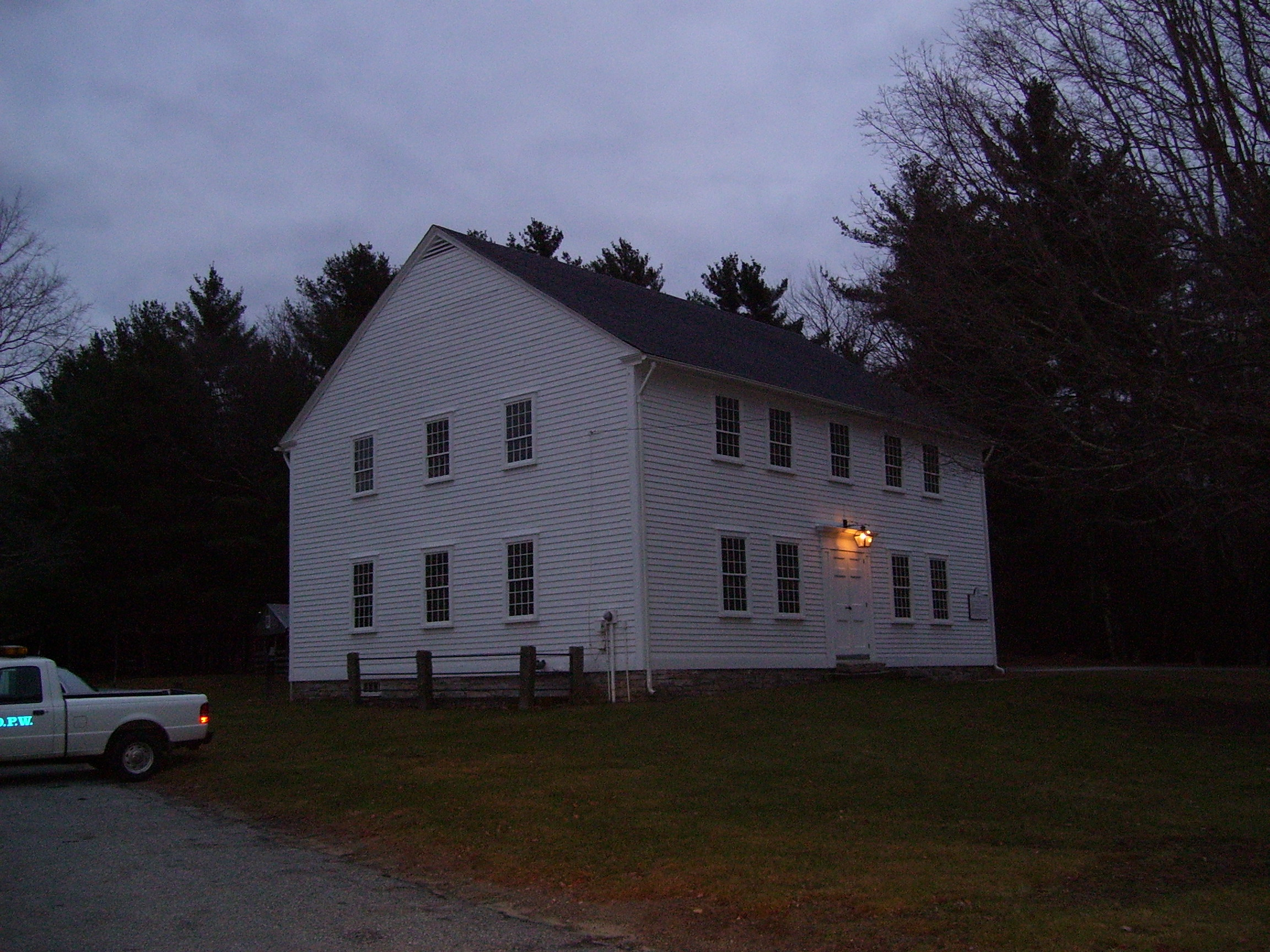
Foster Town Building, ca. 1796, the oldest government meeting house of its type in the United States where town meetings have been held continuously since 1801

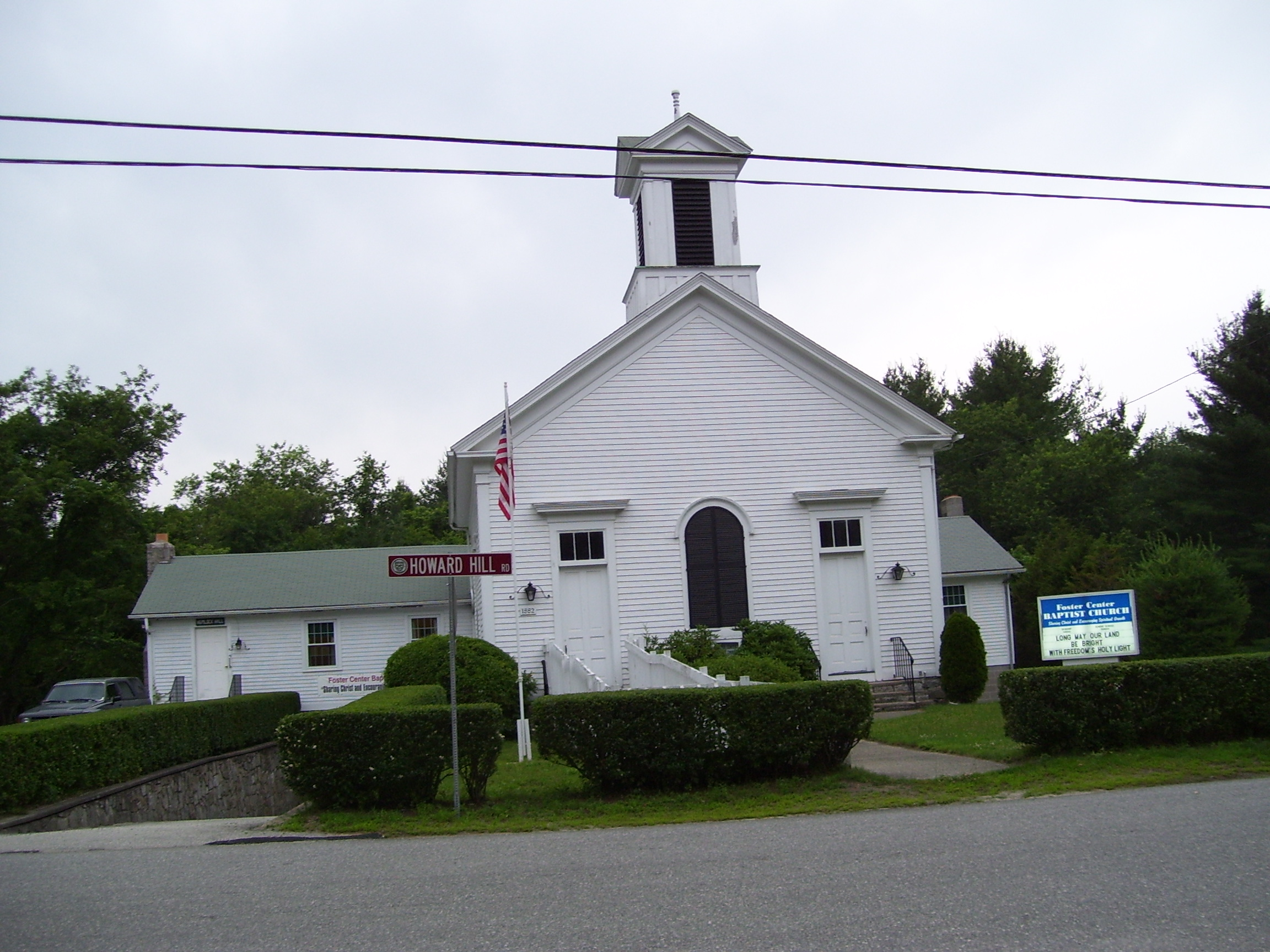
Foster Center's Baptist Church

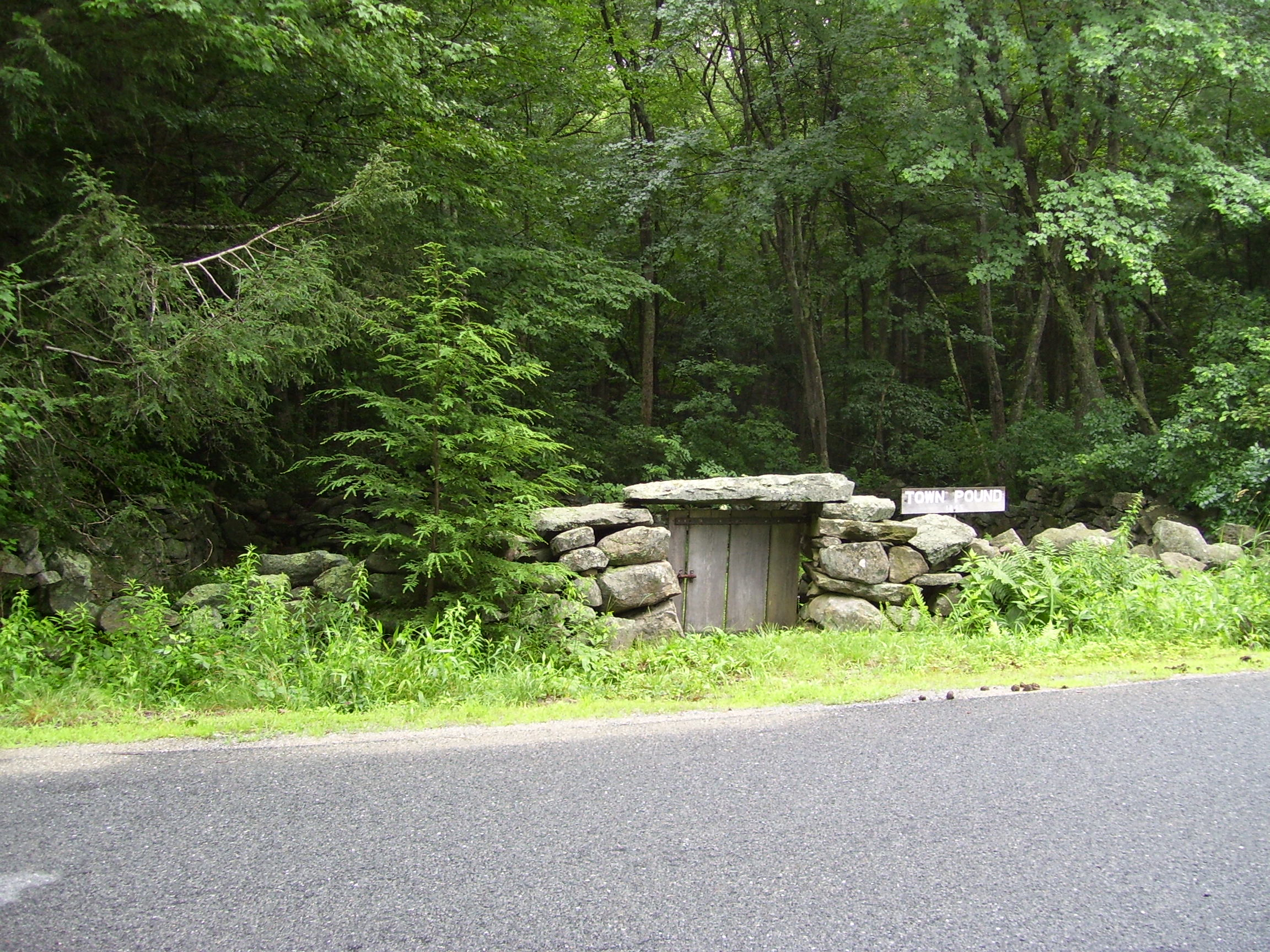
Foster's Town Pound, ca. 1845

== See also ==
- National Register of Historic Places listings in Providence County, Rhode Island
