= Mount Vernon Tavern =

- U.S. National Register of Historic Places
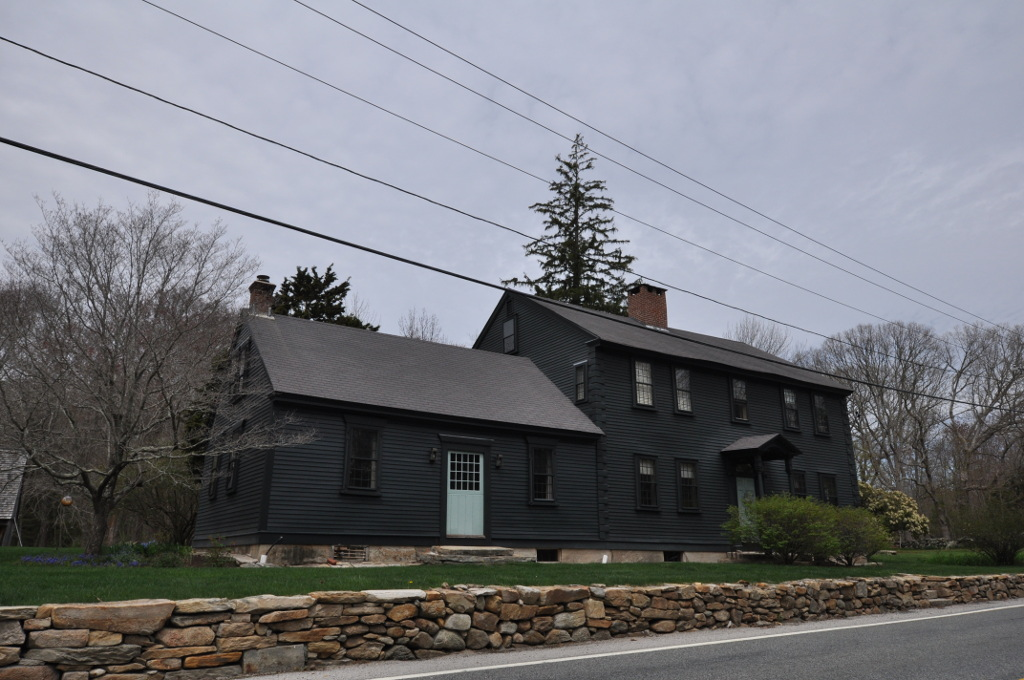

- Location within Rhode Island Location within the United States
- Nearest city: Foster, Rhode Island
- Coordinates: 41°43′51″N 71°42′52″W
- NRHP reference No.: 74000001
- Added to NRHP: May 8, 1974

The Mount Vernon Tavern, also known as the Bank House Tavern, is an historic house in Foster, Rhode Island. It is located at 199 Plainfield Pike (Rhode Island Route 14), about 3/10 of a mile east of its junction with Howard Hill Road. The main block of the house, a 2 1/2-story wood-frame structure with gable roof, was built c. 1760, and was originally attached to an even older structure which was demolished in the late 19th century. This main block, five bays wide with a central chimney, is attached to a 1 1/2-story gable-roofed ell to the west. The main entrance portico features unusually elaborate Federal styling for a rural location, and was probably added in 1814. The house has long been a landmark on the road, serving as a stagecoach stop on what was the main road between Providence and points in Connecticut.

The building was listed on the National Register of Historic Places in 1974.

== See also ==
- National Register of Historic Places listings in Providence County, Rhode Island
