= Breezy Hill Site (RI-957) =

- U.S. National Register of Historic Places
- Location: Foster, Rhode Island
- NRHP reference No.: 85002700
- Added to NRHP: September 28, 1985

The Breezy Hill Site (RI-957) is a prehistoric archaeological site in Foster, Rhode Island. Finds at the site have been dated to 500–1000 AD, and included dentate stamped pottery fragments.

The site was added to the National Register of Historic Places in 1985.

== See also ==
- National Register of Historic Places listings in Providence County, Rhode Island
