= Capt. George Dorrance House =

Historic house in Rhode Island, United States

- U.S. National Register of Historic Places
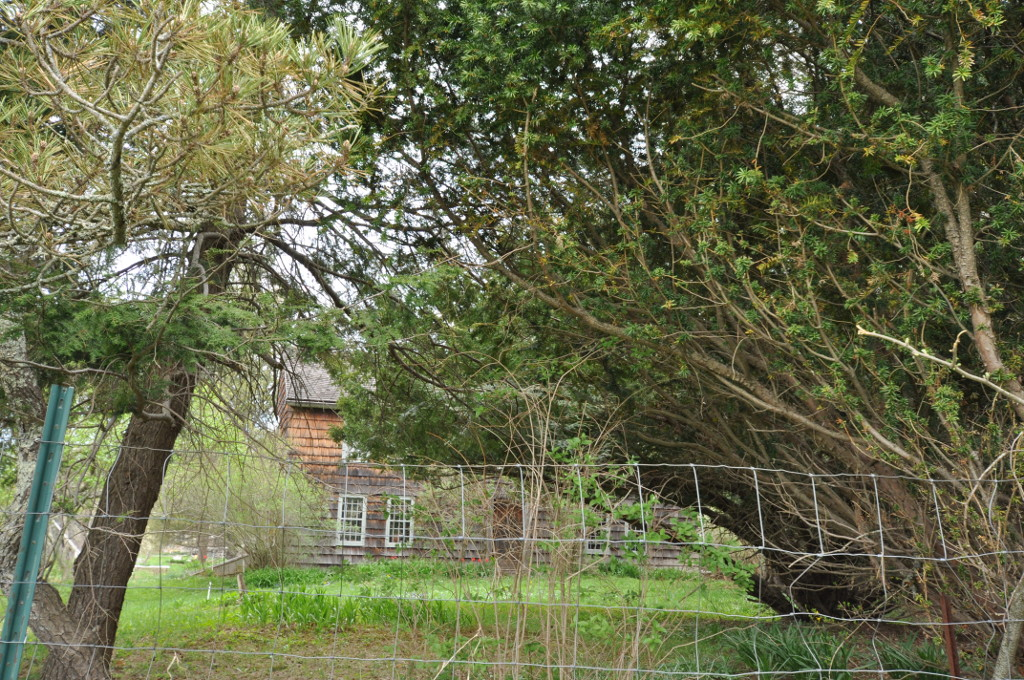

- Location within Rhode Island Location within the United States
- Location: 2 Jencks Rd., Foster, Rhode Island
- Coordinates: 41°44′22″N 71°47′12″W
- Built: 1720
- Architectural style: Colonial
- NRHP reference No.: 72000039
- Added to NRHP: March 16, 1972

The Captain George Dorrance House is an historic house in Foster, Rhode Island. It is located on the west side of the road, a short way south of its junctions with Plain Woods Road, not far from the Connecticut border. It is a 2 1/2-story wood-frame structure, five bays wide, with a gable roof and a large central chimney. The main block was built c. 1720, and a leanto was added c. 1750. It is one of the best-preserved early 18th-century houses in the state.

The house was listed on the National Register of Historic Places on March 16, 1972.

== See also ==
- National Register of Historic Places listings in Providence County, Rhode Island
