= Moosup Valley Historic District =

Historic district in Rhode Island, United States

- U.S. National Register of Historic Places
- U.S. Historic district
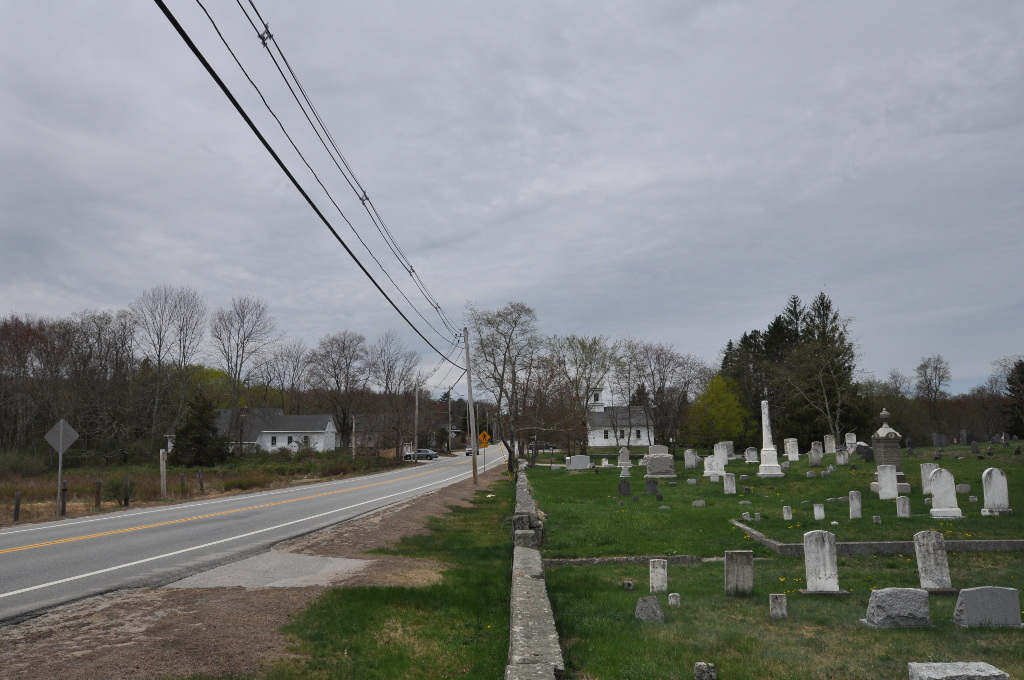

- Location within Rhode Island Location within the United States
- Location: Foster, Rhode Island
- Coordinates: 41°44′25″N 71°45′23″W
- Area: 1,730 acres (700 ha)
- Built: 1851
- Architectural style: Greek Revival, Colonial, Federal
- MPS: Foster MPS
- NRHP reference No.: 88000521
- Added to NRHP: May 11, 1988

The Moosup Valley Historic District is a rural, agricultural historic district in western Foster, Rhode Island. The focal center of the area is a small village where Moosup Valley Road crosses the Moosup River, and where the Moosup Valley Christian Church is located. The largest concentration of buildings in the district lie along a roughly one-mile stretch of Moosup Valley Road west of Rhode Island Route 14, with properties extending along some of the winding roads (paved and unpaved) that extend from that road. The district encompasses most of the headwaters of the Moosup River. The major public buildings are the church, a vernacular Greek Revival structure built in 1864–65, and the Grange hall, built in 1926. There is also a one-room schoolhouse which was built in 1811, and later used as a library and community center.

The district was listed on the National Register of Historic Places in 1988.

== See also ==
- National Register of Historic Places listings in Providence County, Rhode Island
