= Hygia =

Scientific classification
- Domain: Eukaryota
- Kingdom: Animalia
- Phylum: Arthropoda
- Class: Insecta
- Order: Hemiptera
- Suborder: Heteroptera
- Family: Coreidae
- Subfamily: Coreinae
- Tribe: Colpurini
- Genus: Hygia; Uhler, 1861

Genus of insects

Hygia is a large genus of Asian bugs in the tribe Colpurini, erected by Philip Reese Uhler in 1861.

== Species ==
The Coreoidea Species File lists:

subgenus Australocolpura Brailovsky, 1993

1. Hygia sandaracine Brailovsky, 1993

subgenus Caracolpura Breddin, 1900

1. Hygia planiceps (Breddin, 1900)

subgenus Colpura Bergroth, 1894

1. Hygia afflicta (Walker, 1871)
2. Hygia bidentata Ren, 1987
3. Hygia bituberosa Ren & Jin, 1985
4. Hygia breddini (Bergroth, 1906)
5. Hygia capitata Ren & Jin, 1985
6. Hygia cornosa Ren, 1987
7. Hygia fasciiger Hsiao, 1964
8. Hygia funebris (Distant, 1901)
9. Hygia funesta Hsiao, 1964
10. Hygia hainana Hsiao, 1964
11. Hygia lata Hsiao, 1964
12. Hygia lativentris (Motschulsky, 1866)
13. Hygia lobata Ren, 1987
14. Hygia luteifusula (Breddin, 1900)
15. Hygia nana Hsiao, 1964
16. Hygia nigrifusula (Breddin, 1900)
17. Hygia notata Ren & Jin, 1985
18. Hygia obscura (Dallas, 1852)
19. Hygia omeia Hsiao, 1963
20. Hygia pallidicornis (Stål, 1871)
21. Hygia rostrata Hsiao, 1964
22. Hygia simalurensis Blöte, 1936
23. Hygia simulans Hsiao, 1964
24. Hygia sulcata (Paiva, 1919)
25. Hygia turpis (Walker, 1871)
26. Hygia unicolor Ren, 1987
27. Hygia wulingana Ren, 1993
28. Hygia yunnana Hsiao, 1964

subgenus Eucolpura Breddin, 1900

1. Hygia cassisi Brailovsky, 2004
2. Hygia dolens Breddin, 1906
3. Hygia heveli Brailovsky & Barrera, 1997
4. Hygia lugubris (Walker, 1871)
5. Hygia melas Brailovsky & Barrera, 1997
6. Hygia moesta (Walker, 1871)
7. Hygia scrutatrix (Breddin, 1900)
8. Hygia severa (Breddin, 1906)

subgenus Hygia Uhler, 1861

1. Hygia diplochela (Bergroth, 1921)
2. Hygia erebus (Distant, 1901)
3. Hygia magna Hsiao, 1964
4. Hygia opaca (Uhler, 1860)
5. Hygia pedestris Blöte, 1936
6. Hygia pusilla Ren, 1987
7. Hygia rosacea Ren, 1987
8. Hygia signata Ren, 1987

subgenus Microcolpura Breddin, 1900

1. Hygia binaluana Brailovsky & Barrera, 2005
2. Hygia dulita Brailovsky, 2002
3. Hygia flavitarsis Blöte, 1936
4. Hygia hebeticollis (Breddin, 1905)
5. Hygia humilis Breddin, 1906
6. Hygia imbellis (Breddin, 1900)
7. Hygia incultus Brailovsky & Barrera, 2005
8. Hygia inermicollis (Breddin, 1900)
9. Hygia inermis (Walker, 1871)
10. Hygia labecula (Distant, 1901)
11. Hygia modesta (Distant, 1901)
12. Hygia pacalis (Breddin, 1906)
13. Hygia selangorana Brailovsky & Barrera, 2005
14. Hygia siberuta Brailovsky, 2002
15. Hygia siporana Brailovsky, 2002
16. Hygia speculigera (Breddin, 1906)
17. Hygia terebrans (Breddin, 1906)

subgenus Pterocolpura Blöte, 1936

1. Hygia alta Brailovsky & Barrera, 2006
2. Hygia angulicollis (Breddin, 1900)
3. Hygia annulipes (Dallas, 1852)
4. Hygia anthrax Brailovsky, 2006
5. Hygia armillata (Breddin, 1900)
6. Hygia borneensis Brailovsky & Barrera, 2006
7. Hygia brevipennis (Bergroth, 1921)
8. Hygia denticollis (Bergroth, 1918)
9. Hygia diaphora Brailovsky, 2006
10. Hygia frontalis Brailovsky & Barrera, 2005
11. Hygia kinabaluna Brailovsky, 2002
12. Hygia mjobergi Brailovsky & Barrera, 2006
13. Hygia montana Blöte, 1936
14. Hygia murundina Brailovsky & Barrera, 2006
15. Hygia noctua (Distant, 1901)
16. Hygia nodulosa (Distant, 1889)
17. Hygia pajuana Brailovsky, 2002
18. Hygia pentafurcata Brailovsky, 2002
19. Hygia reyesi Brailovsky & Barrera, 2006
20. Hygia sarawak Brailovsky, 2002
21. Hygia sylvestris Brailovsky, 2006
22. Hygia tomokunii Brailovsky & Barrera, 2006
23. Hygia tuberculicollis (Breddin, 1900)
24. Hygia vantoli Brailovsky & Barrera, 2006
25. Hygia varipes (Westwood, 1842)
26. Hygia webbi Brailovsky & Barrera, 2006

subgenus Sphinctocolpura Breddin, 1900

1. Hygia alvarezi Brailovsky, 2004
2. Hygia conspersipes (Breddin, 1901)
3. Hygia dentifer (Stål, 1871)
4. Hygia dumoga Brailovsky, 2000
5. Hygia forsteniana Blöte, 1936
6. Hygia guttatipes (Breddin, 1901)
7. Hygia lepida Brailovsky, 2000
8. Hygia maculipes (Stål, 1871)
9. Hygia minahassae Blöte, 1936
10. Hygia obscuripes (Stål, 1871)
11. Hygia oligotricha Brailovsky, 2004
12. Hygia palumae Brailovsky, 2000
13. Hygia pictipes (Stål, 1871)
14. Hygia presigna Brailovsky, 2000
15. Hygia pronotata Brailovsky, 2000
16. Hygia punctipes (Stål, 1871)
17. Hygia roratipes (Breddin, 1901)
18. Hygia scitula Brailovsky, 2000
19. Hygia tengaha Brailovsky, 2000
20. Hygia terminalis Brailovsky, 2000
21. Hygia utaranus Brailovsky, 2000

subgenus Stenocolpura Breddin, 1900

1. Hygia annulata (Bergroth, 1921)
2. Hygia javanensis (Distant, 1901)
3. Hygia nugax (Breddin, 1906)
4. Hygia stenocephala (Breddin, 1900)
5. Hygia stenocephaloides (Breddin, 1900)

subgenus Trichocolpura Breddin, 1900

1. Hygia blotei Brailovsky, 1990
2. Hygia cliens Dolling, 1987
3. Hygia schultheissi (Breddin, 1900)
