= Mount Hygeia =

Historic house in Rhode Island, United States

- Mt. Hygeia
- U.S. National Register of Historic Places
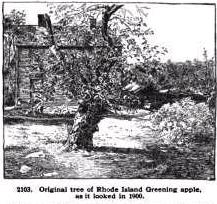
- Early Rhode Island Greening apple tree on Mt. Hygeia, pictured ca. 1900

- Location within Rhode Island Location within the United States
- Location: Foster, Rhode Island
- Coordinates: 41°50′48″N 71°45′17″W
- Built: 1808
- Architectural style: Federal
- NRHP reference No.: 77000008
- Added to NRHP: August 12, 1977

Mt. Hygeia (also known as the "Solomon Drown House") is an historic farm property at 83 Mt. Hygeia Road in Foster, Rhode Island, United States.

== History ==
Dr. Solomon Drowne, a prominent physician, academic, botanist, and surgeon during the American Revolution, owned the property in the early nineteenth century. Around 1801 Drowne returned to Rhode Island and bought the farm next to Senator Foster and named it Mt. Hygeia after the Greek goddess of health. As near as can be determined, Drown's home was built around 1806 (as determined by Anselyn Lynch researching for the National Register of Historic Places). Drowne used the farm for botanical research and named his driveway the "Appian Way". The farm house was built in 1808 in a Federal style. One of the oldest Rhode Island Greening trees was located on the property at the turn of the twentieth century.

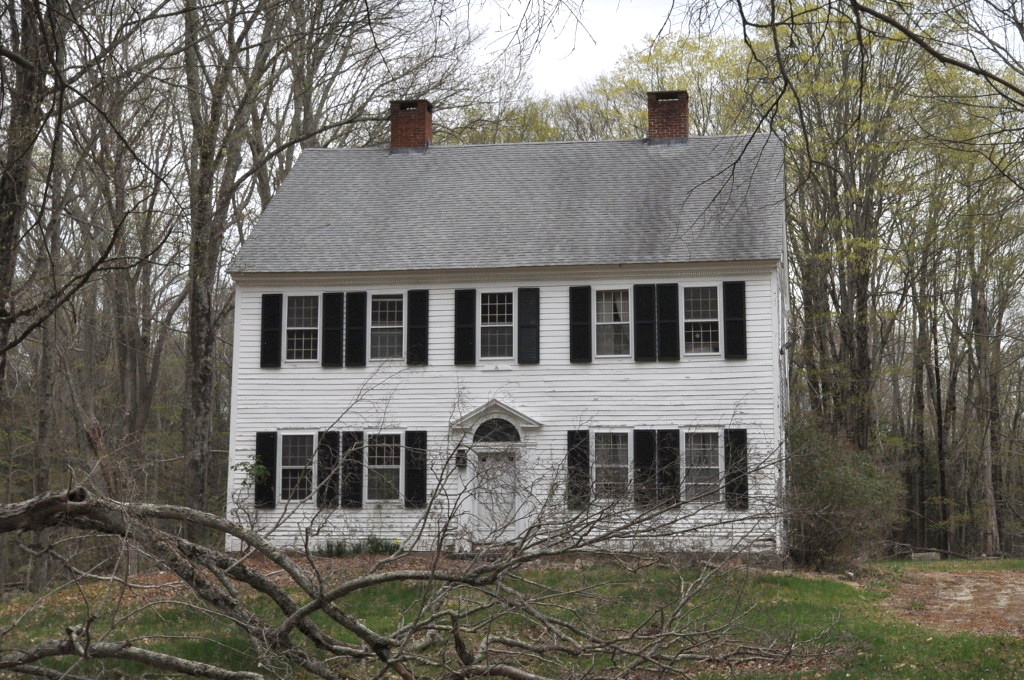
The house in 2015

Application to list the property on the National Register of Historic Places was filed in 1977. The property was approved and listed August 12, 1977.

== See also ==
- National Register of Historic Places listings in Providence County, Rhode Island
