= Foster, Rhode Island =

Town in Rhode Island, United States

Foster
- Town
- Town of Foster
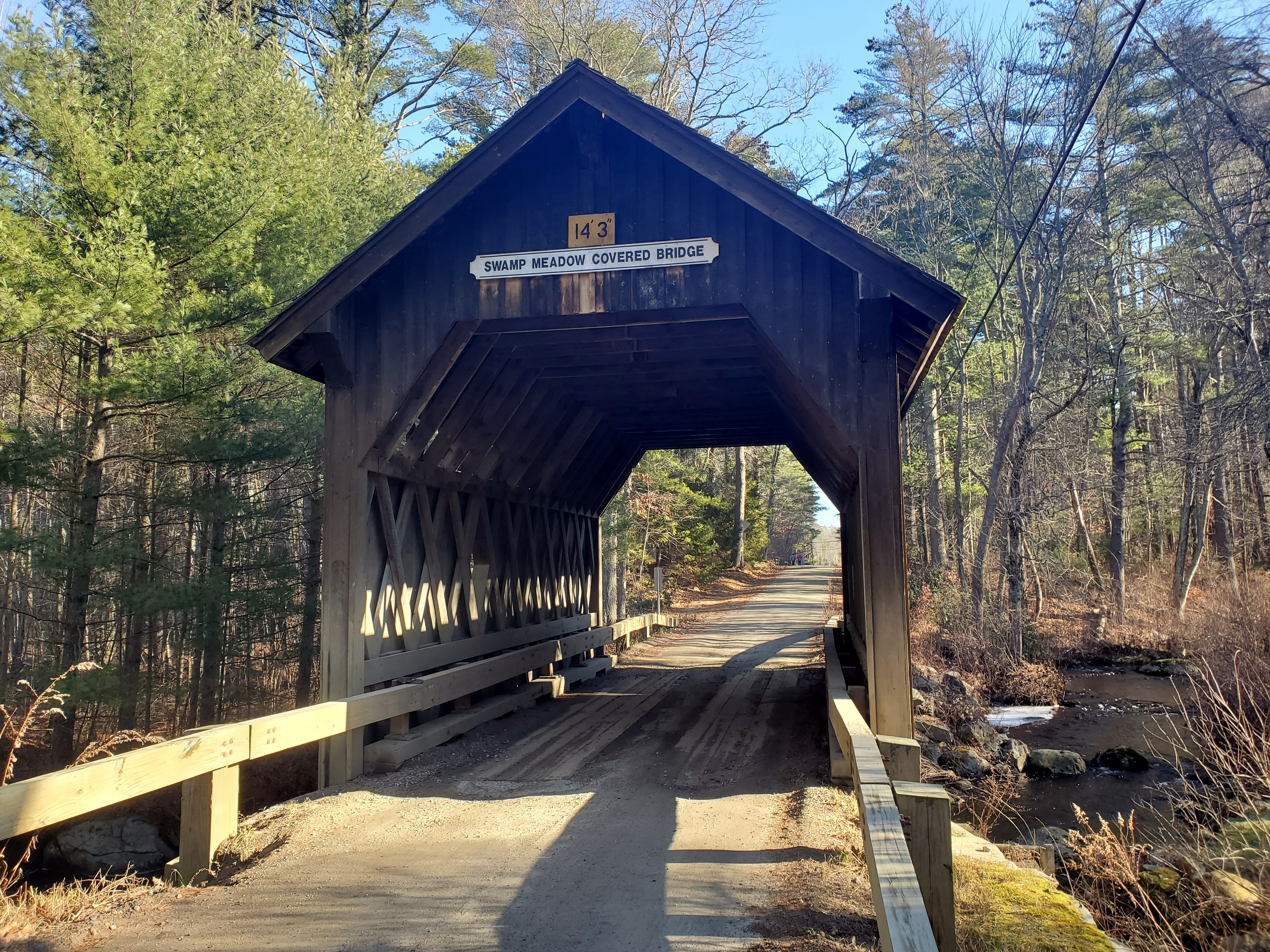
- The Swamp Meadow Bridge

- Seal Coat of arms
- Interactive map of Foster
- Location of Foster in Rhode Island Location in the United States Location in North America
- Coordinates: 41°47′49″N 71°43′38″W
- Country: United States
- State: Rhode Island
- County: Providence

Government
  - Type: Town meeting
  - Town Council: Denise L. DiFranco; Heidi Rogers; Cheryl Hawes; Chris Stone; David Paolino
  - Town Moderator: Robert A. Boyden
  - Town Clerk: Susan Dillon

Area
  - Total: 51.9 sq mi (134.3 km^{2})
  - Land: 51.2 sq mi (132.5 km^{2})
  - Water: 0.73 sq mi (1.9 km^{2})
- Elevation: 495 ft (151 m)

Population (2020)
  - Total: 4,469
  - Density: 87/sq mi (33.7/km^{2})
- Time zone: UTC−5 (Eastern (EST))
  - Summer (DST): UTC−4 (EDT)
- ZIP Code: 02825
- Area code: 401
- FIPS code: 44-27460
- GNIS feature ID: 1220072
- Website: www.townoffoster.com

Foster is a town in Providence County, Rhode Island, United States. The population was 4,469 at the 2020 census.

== History ==
Foster was originally settled in the 17th century by British colonists as a farming community. In the year 1662, William Vaughan, Zachariah Rhodes, and Robert Wescott, purchased from the Indians a large tract of land called West Quanaug, bordering on Providence. The West Quanaug purchase included nearly the whole southern half of the town of Foster. The first English settler was allegedly Ezekiel Hopkins. Many settlers from Newport were active in the town in the 18th century. Shortly before the incorporation of the town, Foster's first church, a Calvinist Baptist congregation was founded. Shortly afterward, Six Principle Baptist and Free Will Baptist congregations were founded.

Foster was incorporated with Scituate, Rhode Island in 1730, forming the western section of that township, and remained part of Scituate until 1781, when it was split off as a distinct and separate township. Foster derived its name from U.S. Senator Theodore Foster. Mr. Foster presented the town with a library. Some of the library's original books and town records are still preserved. U.S. Senator Nelson Aldrich was born in Foster in 1841. Senator Aldrich was instrumental in starting the U.S. Federal Reserve Board.

In the 1920s, the Ku Klux Klan was active in the area. The largest Klan rally north of the Mason–Dixon line was held in Foster on the Old Home Day grounds in 1924 with 8,000 in attendance and U.S. Senator J. Thomas Heflin of Alabama speaking. Foster remained a bastion of racial and religious bigotry for more than half a century.

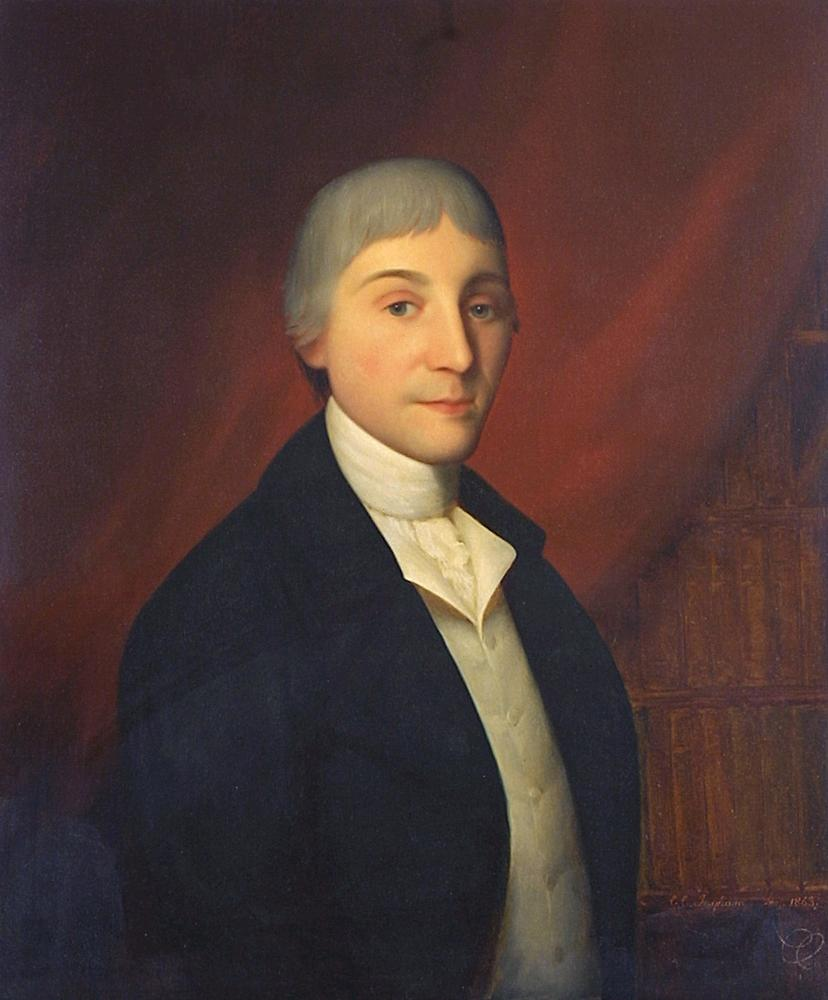
Solomon Drowne, a prominent American physician, academic and surgeon during the American Revolution

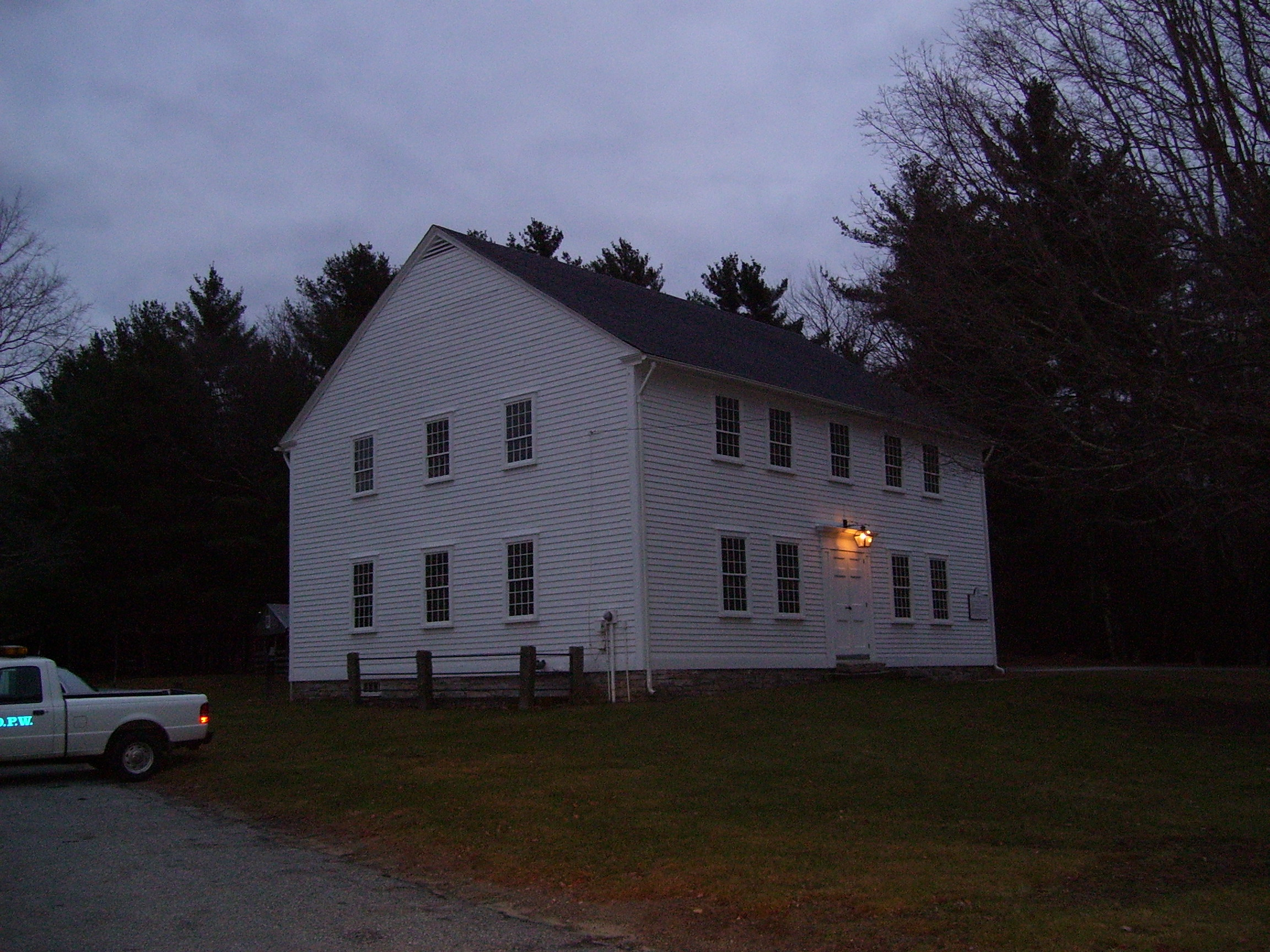
Foster Town Building, c. 1796, the oldest government meeting house of its type in the United States where town meetings have been held continuously since 1801

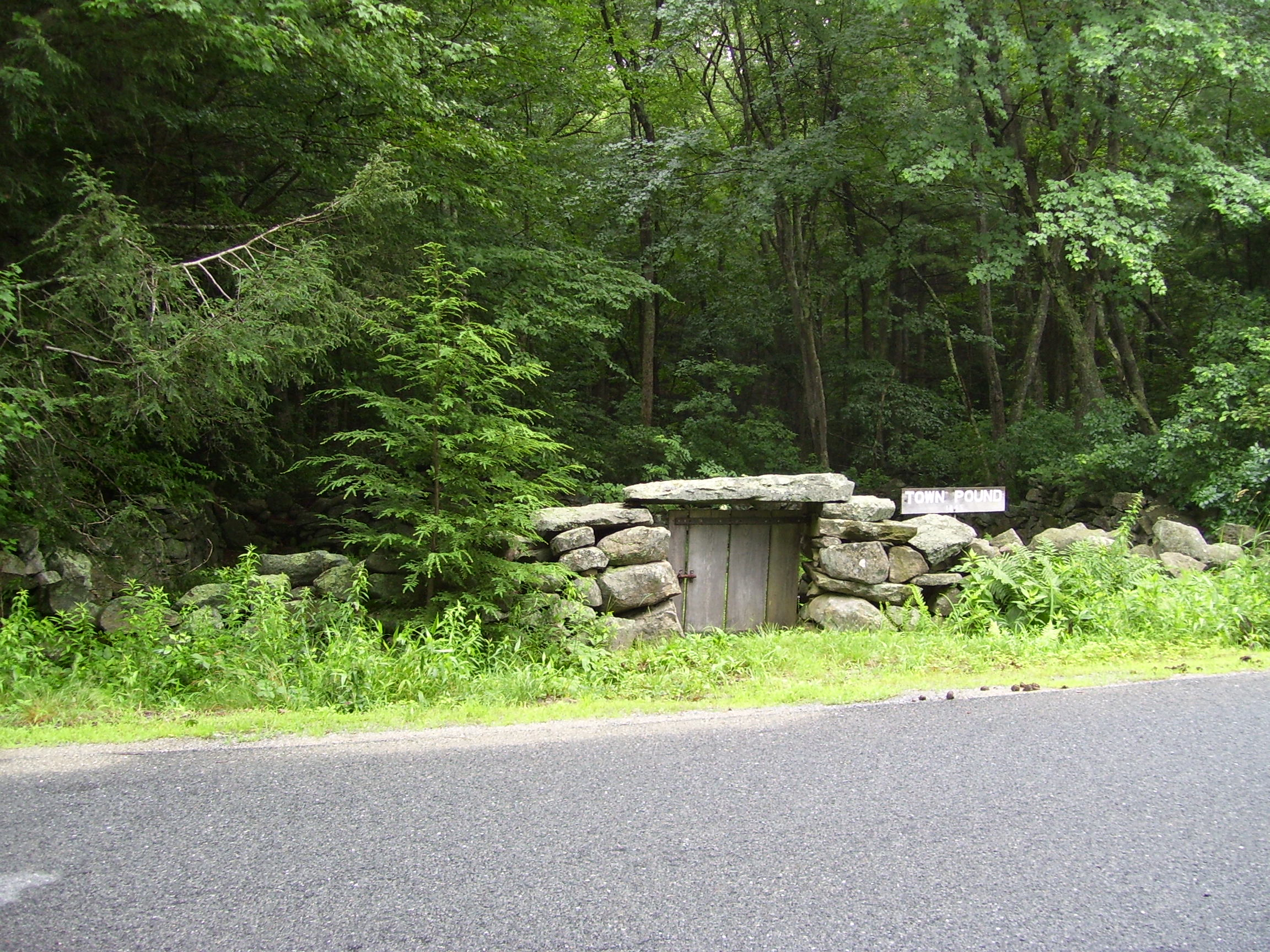
The Town Pound in Foster Center Historic District, c. 1845

== Geography ==
According to the United States Census Bureau, the town has a total area of 51.9 square miles (134 km^{2}), of which 51.1 square miles (132 km^{2}) is land and 0.7 square miles (1.8 km^{2}) (1.41%) is water. Foster contains Rhode Island's highest point, Jerimoth Hill, with an elevation of 248 m (814 ft). It also contains the census-designated place of Foster Center and part of Clayville.

=== Climate ===
The climate in this area experiences mild differences between highs and lows, and there is adequate rainfall year-round. According to the Köppen Climate Classification system, Foster has an oceanic climate, abbreviated "Cfb" on climate maps.

Climate data for Foster, Rhode Island
Month	Jan	Feb	Mar	Apr	May	Jun	Jul	Aug	Sep	Oct	Nov	Dec	Year
Record high °F (°C)	67 (19)	68 (20)	88 (31)	94 (34)	93 (34)	94 (34)	97 (36)	97 (36)	94 (34)	84 (29)	78 (26)	75 (24)	97 (36)
Mean daily maximum °F (°C)	34 (1)	38 (3)	46 (8)	57 (14)	67 (19)	75 (24)	80 (27)	78 (26)	71 (22)	60.7 (15.9)	50 (10)	39 (4)	58.4 (14.7)
Daily mean °F (°C)	25.7 (−3.5)	28.4 (−2.0)	36.4 (2.4)	47 (8)	57.1 (13.9)	65.2 (18.4)	70.4 (21.3)	69.1 (20.6)	61.5 (16.4)	50.6 (10.3)	41.4 (5.2)	30.6 (−0.8)	48.6 (9.2)
Mean daily minimum °F (°C)	17 (−8)	20 (−7)	27 (−3)	36 (2)	46 (8)	55 (13)	60 (16)	59 (15)	52 (11)	41 (5)	32 (0)	23 (−5)	38.8 (3.8)
Record low °F (°C)	−13 (−25)	−11 (−24)	−1 (−18)	14 (−10)	27 (−3)	36 (2)	42 (6)	39 (4)	31 (−1)	21 (−6)	4 (−16)	−15 (−26)	−15 (−26)
Average precipitation inches (mm)	4.28 (109)	4.12 (105)	5.45 (138)	4.70 (119)	3.92 (100)	4.58 (116)	3.82 (97)	4.33 (110)	4.09 (104)	4.77 (121)	4.96 (126)	4.84 (123)	53.86 (1,368)
Average precipitation days	12	10	12	11	13	12	11	10	10	11	11	12	135
Mean daily sunshine hours	10.1	11.1	12.5	13.9	15.1	15.7	15.4	14.3	12.9	11.5	10.3	9.7	12.7
Source: Weatherbase

== Demographics ==
Historical population
Census	Pop.	Note	%±
1790	2,268		—
1800	2,457		8.3%
1810	2,613		6.3%
1820	2,900		11.0%
1830	2,672		−7.9%
1840	2,181		−18.4%
1850	1,932		−11.4%
1860	1,935		0.2%
1870	1,630		−15.8%
1880	1,552		−4.8%
1890	1,252		−19.3%
1900	1,151		−8.1%
1910	1,124		−2.3%
1920	905		−19.5%
1930	916		1.2%
1940	1,237		35.0%
1950	1,630		31.8%
1960	2,097		28.7%
1970	2,626		25.2%
1980	3,370		28.3%
1990	4,316		28.1%
2000	4,274		−1.0%
2010	4,606		7.8%
2020	4,469		−3.0%
U.S. Decennial Census

As of the census of 2020, there were 4,469 people and 1,504 households in the town. The population density was 88.0 inhabitants per square mile (34.0/km^{2}). There were 1,836 housing units in the town. The racial makeup of the town was 93.53% White, 0.58% African American, 0.16% Native American, 0.85% Asian, 0.78% from other races, and 4.07% from two or more races. Hispanic or Latino of any race were 2.03% of the population. Foster's zip code, 02825, has a significantly larger population than the town of Foster. This is because the zip code extends into parts of the more populated town of Scituate, Rhode Island.

There were 1,504 households, out of which 33.5% had children under the age of 18 living with them, 63.4% were married couples living together, 17.7% had a female householder with no spouse present, and 10.6% had a male householder with no spouse present. 4.5% of all households were made up of individuals, and 3.3% had someone living alone who was 65 years of age or older. The average household size was 2.98 and the average family size was 3.27.

In the town, the population was spread out, with 18.7% under the age of 18, 6.6% from 18 to 24, 23.2% from 25 to 44, 32.4% from 45 to 64, and 19.1% who were 65 years of age or older. The median age was 46.5 years.

The median income for a household in the town was $110,782, and the median income for a family was $114,018. About 3.9% of the population was below the poverty line, including 3.9% of those under age 18 and 2.3% of those age 65 or over.

== Education ==
Foster's Capt. Isaac Paine Elementary School has the top spot for reading proficiency according to the New England Common Assessment Program, or NECAP, exams. 82 percent of its students attained proficiency, the state leader in that testing category.

== Arts and culture ==
=== Tourism ===
Foster is home to the Foster Town House. Built in 1796 and in use to this day, the Foster Town House is the oldest government meeting house of its type in the United States. Foster also contains Rhode Island's only authentic covered bridge, the Swamp Meadow Covered Bridge. (Note: Another covered bridge is located on Ponaganset High School's Cross Country Course in Scituate, but it lacks the supporting timber trusses that would make it authentic.) Built in 1994 by Jed Dixon, a Foster resident, it is a reproduction of an early-19th-century specimen. It is the only covered bridge in Rhode Island located on a public road. Jerimoth Hill, the highest point of elevation in Rhode Island, is located in Foster.

Dyer Woods, Rhode Island's only nudist campground, is in Foster.

== Notable people ==
- Nelson Aldrich, US senator from Rhode Island; father of Abby Rockefeller; born in Foster
- Solomon Drowne, physician and author; confidante of Theodore Foster; lived in Foster on a farm named Mount Hygeia
- Theodore Foster, US senator from Rhode Island; the town of Foster is named after him
- Clarke Howard Johnson, Rhode Island legislator and state supreme court justice
- Albert W. Hicks, One of the last persons executed for piracy in the United States

== Historic Places in Foster ==
- Foster Center Historic District
- Breezy Hill Site (RI-957)
- Clayville Historic District
- Capt. George Dorrance House (1720)
- Moosup Valley Historic District
- Mount Vernon Tavern (1761)
- Mt. Hygeia (1808)
- Line Baptist Church (1867)

== See also ==
- Foster Preservation Society (https://www.fosterpreservationsociety.org)
