= Heathcote =

Heathcote may refer to:

== Places ==
in Australia

- Heathcote, New South Wales, a southern suburb of Sydney
  - Electoral district of Heathcote, a seat in the New South Wales Legislative Assembly
  - Heathcote National Park
  - Parish of Heathcote, a parish of Cumberland County
- Heathcote, Victoria
  - Heathcote-Graytown National Park
  - Heathcote wine region
- Heathcote Junction, Victoria
- Heathcote South, Victoria
- Point Heathcote, Western Australia

in Canada

- Heathcote Lake, Ontario

in England

- Heathcote, Ilkley, a villa in West Yorkshire
- Heathcote, Derbyshire
- Heathcote, Shropshire
- Heathcote, Warwickshire, a suburb of Warwick

in New Zealand

- Heathcote Valley, a suburb of Christchurch
  - Ōpāwaho / Heathcote River, also in Christchurch
  - Heathcote (New Zealand electorate)

in the United States

- Heathcote Community, Maryland
- Heathcote, New Jersey
  - Heathcote Brook
  - Withington Estate, also known as Heathcote Farm

== People ==
as a forename

- Heathcote Helmore (1894–1965), New Zealand architect
- Heathcote Howard Hammer (1905–1961), Australian soldier
- Heathcote Dicken Statham (1889–1973), British conductor and composer
- Heathcote Williams (1941–2017), English poet, actor and playwright
- Heathcote Williams (cricket administrator) (1859–1931), New Zealand cricket administrator

as a surname

- Heathcote (surname)
- Heathcote baronets, in the baronetage of Great Britain

== Other ==
- Heathcote Botanical Gardens, Florida
- Heathcote School (disambiguation), several establishments

== See also ==
- Heathcoat-Amory baronets
- Heathcott, a surname
