= Heathcote (surname) =

Heathcote is a surname rooted in English topography which literally means "Heath Cottage". The location in Derbyshire was first recorded in the Domesday Book of 1086 as "Hedcote", and as "Hethcote" in 1244. The location in Warwickshire appears is written "Hethcot" in the 1196 Feet of Fines for the county. The Anglo-Saxon surname "Heathcote" originates from a hamlet that stands high on the barren hills above Dovedale and Hartington. The place-name refers to a cottage on a heath or wasteland where was found an outlying farm or grange of Grendon Abbey. The said Grendon Abbey was founded in 1133. Some of the earliest references to the grange at Heathcote are found in records of the 1300s and 15th century.

Some variations of the name are Heathcoat and Heathcott. Notable people with the surname include:

- Alastair Heathcote (b. 1977), British rower
- Alfred Spencer Heathcote (1832–1912), English recipient of the Victoria Cross
- Andy Heathcote (b. 1964), Scottish filmmaker
- Bella Heathcote (b. 1987), Australian actress
- Caleb Heathcote (1666–1721), Mayor of New York City, brother of Sir Gilbert Heathcote
- Charles Henry Heathcote (1850–1938), British architect
- Cliff Heathcote (1898–1939), American baseball player
- David Heathcote (1931–2025), British artist, collector and academic
- Dorothy Heathcote (1926–2011), British drama educator
- Edwin Heathcote (b. 1968), British architect
- Gilbert Heathcote (disambiguation), several people
- Henry Heathcote (1777–1851), Royal Navy officer
- Joe Heathcote (1878–unknown), English footballer
- John Heathcote (disambiguation), several people
- Jud Heathcote (1927–2017), American college basketball coach
- Mick Heathcote (b. 1965), English footballer
- Norman Heathcote, British author, watercolourist and photographer
- Paul Heathcote (born 1960), British restaurateur
- Richard Edensor Heathcote (1780–1850), British politician
- Robert Heathcote (archer) (1847–1918), British archer
- Sophie Heathcote (1972–2006), Australian actress
- Thomas Heathcote (1917–1986), British actor
- Vita Heathcote (born 2001), British Olympic sailor

== See also ==
- Heathcote baronets
