= Stillwater =

Stillwater or still water may refer to:

- A colloquial name for water stagnation
- Still water, water that is not carbonated

== Places ==
=== Settlements in the United States ===
- Stillwater, Maine, a community in the city of Old Town
- Stillwater, Minnesota
- Stillwater County, Montana
  - Stillwater igneous complex
- Stillwater, Nevada
- Stillwater, New Jersey
- Stillwater, New York
  - Stillwater (village), New York
- Stillwater, Ohio
- Stillwater, Oklahoma
- Stillwater, Ossining
- Stillwater, Pennsylvania
- Stillwater village, Town of Smithville, Rhode Island, home of Stillwater Worsted Mills
- Stillwater, Washington
- Stillwater Township (disambiguation)

=== Settlements in other countries ===
- Stillwater, Edmonton, Alberta, Canada
- Stillwater, Nova Scotia (disambiguation), several places in Canada
- Stillwater, Auckland, North Island of New Zealand
- Stillwater, West Coast, South Island of New Zealand

== Arts and entertainment ==
- Stillwater (band), a 1970s music group
- Stillwater (fictional band), from the 2000 film Almost Famous
- Stillwater, a fictional panda in the 2005 book Zen Shorts
  - Stillwater (TV series), an animated adaptation
- Stillwater (film), a 2021 American crime drama
- Still Water (sculpture), a 2011 bronze of a horse's head at Marble Arch, London, England
- "Still Water (Love)" and "Still Water (Peace)", 1970 songs by Four Tops
- Stillwater, a comic book written by Chip Zdarsky

== Businesses and organizations ==
- Still Water (University of Maine), a former laboratory at the University of Maine, U.S.
- Stillwater Mill, a former textile factory in Smithfield, Rhode Island, U.S.
- Stillwater Mining Company, a palladium and platinum mining company
- Minnesota Correctional Facility – Stillwater, an American prison

== See also ==
- Stillwater River (disambiguation)
- Still Waters (disambiguation)
- Still waters run deep (disambiguation)
- Stilwater, a fictional city in video game Saints Row
- Stillwaterite, a palladium arsenide mineral
