= Jeffrey Oppenheim =

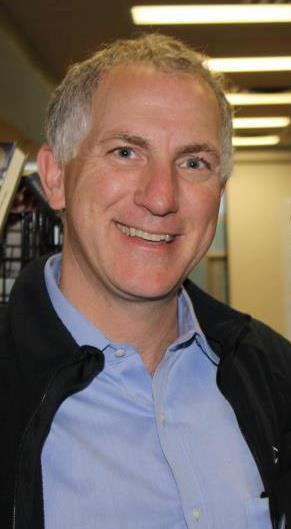

Mayor of The Village of Montebello
- Incumbent
- Assumed office January 2007
- Preceded by: Kathryn Gorman

Personal details
- Born: Jeffrey Sable Oppenheim; January 31, 1962 (age 64) Queens, New York, U.S.
- Party: Preserve Montebello
- Education: Princeton University (B.S.); Cornell University (M.D.)
- Occupation: Neurosurgeon; Mayor
- Website: Hudson Valley Brain and Spine

Jeffrey Sable Oppenheim (born January 31, 1962) is an American physician and politician, known for being a neurosurgeon in the state of New York as well as the second mayor of the Village of Montebello, New York. He is the chairman of the Rockland County Board of Health.

== Education and early life ==
Oppenheim received his undergraduate degree in Neuroscience from Princeton University in 1984, finishing his thesis under the mentorship of George Armitage Miller, graduating summa cum laude. He graduated from Cornell University Medical College in 1988 with an M.D. with Honors in research. From 1988 to 1994 he was a neurosurgeon at the Mount Sinai Hospital in New York, serving as chief resident from 1993 to 1994. His father was a chairman and the chief executive officer of Joyce International, a furniture company in New York, and his mother, Joyce Oppenheim, was a sculptor.

He became Board Certified by the American Board of Neurological Surgeons in 1996.

== Awards and distinctions ==
Distinguished Service Award, from the Legislature of Rockland County, September, 2010.

Chief, Section of Neurosurgery, Good Samaritan Hospital, Suffern, York. HealthGrades recognized the spine program at Good Samaritan Hospital, under Oppenheim's leadership, with its highest rating: 5 stars.

Oppenheim's publications have included a case report describing the first case of a spinal cord bypass that facilitated partial recovery from a spinal cord transection, using a peripheral nerve transfer.

Oppenheim's account of the history of neurosurgery at Mt. Sinai Hospital has been adapted by several authors.

== Political interest ==
Oppenheim was elected to the board of trustees in the Village of Montebello in 2003. The grassroots local political party he founded, Preserve Montebello, took majority control of the board of trustees in 2005. In 2007 he was elected mayor of the village. He is the second mayor in the history of the village, which was incorporated in 1986.

Under the Mayor's leadership the village has become active and engaged in historic preservation, open-space acquisition, tree preservation, and has encouraged the use of renewable energy sources. The village was the first municipality in Rockland County to be recognized as a "Climate Smart Community" by the NYS DEC., as a "Tree City" by the Arbor Day Foundation and the USDA., and a Historic "Certified Local Government" by National Park Service and New York State.

He has led the village in the acquisition of a community center, the dedication of several parks, the installation of solar electric panels to serve municipal facilities, a review of the village's comprehensive plan, the renovation of Village Hall, and a reduction in the size of the budget. He instituted a regular newsletter, broadcast of Board meetings on television, and open public comment at the beginning and end of every meeting. Oppenheim instituted the first of its kind traffic calming program which allows citizens to petition the Board for the installation of speed humps on public roads. In the first 4 years of this program, speed humps were installed on three streets. Taxes in the Village of Montebello, having the lowest rate of any village in the town of Ramapo, were not raised in either 2010, 2011 or 2013.

Oppenheim serves as the president of the Rockland County Board of Health. In this capacity, he lobbied the county legislature for a local law prohibiting cigarette smoking in cars when children are present. The law was unanimously passed by the legislature and signed into law by the county executive in 2007.

Oppenheim was a delegate to the Republican National Convention in 2012

In 2013 he was named "Businessman of the Year" by the Rockland County Republican Party.

== Philanthropic interest ==
From 2004 to 2009, Oppenheim served on the board of trustees of Good Samaritan Hospital. During his tenure the hospital established an open heart surgical program.

Oppenheim serves on the board of trustees of the American Jewish Historical Society. He helped to secure and preserve the oldest Jewish Tallit in America.
