= Still Waters =

Still waters is an anapodoton (truncation) of the proverb still waters run deep.

Still Waters alone may refer to:

== Film and television ==
- Still Waters (1928 film), a Krazy Kat animated film
- Still Waters (2000 film), a Russian film
- Still Waters (1915 film), a film directed by J. Searle Dawley
- Still Waters, a short documentary about P. K. Page
- "Still Waters" (Murdoch Mysteries), a 2008 television episode

== Books ==
- Still Waters (novel), a 1949 novel by E.C.R. Lorac
- Still Waters, a novel by Jennifer Lauck

== Music ==
- Still Waters (Bee Gees album), an album by the Bee Gees
- Still Waters (Breakbot album), an album by Breakbot
- Still Waters (Louise Setara album), an album by Louise Setara
- "Still Waters", a song by Sault from Aiir, 2022
- Still Waters, composition by Tony Banks of Genesis

== See also ==
- Still Waters Run Deep (disambiguation)
- Stillwater (disambiguation)
- Stilwater, a fictional city in video game Saints Row
