= Jimmy Whitehouse (footballer, born 1873) =

English footballer (1873–1934)

Personal information
- Full name: James Lewington Whitehouse
- Date of birth: 9 April 1873
- Place of birth: Birmingham, England
- Date of death: 7 January 1934 (aged 60)
- Place of death: Birmingham, England
- Position: Goalkeeper

Youth career
- Albion Swifts

Senior career*
Years	Team	Apps	(Gls)
1890–1892	Birmingham St George's		
1892–1896	Grimsby Town	110	(0)
1896–1898	Aston Villa	40	(0)
1898–1899	Bedminster		
1899–1900	Grimsby Town	27	(0)
1900–1903	Manchester United	59	(0)
1903	Manchester City	0	(0)
1903–1904	Third Lanark	0	(0)
1904–1905	Hull City		
1905–1907	Southend United		
- * Club domestic league appearances and goals

James Lewington Whitehouse (9 April 1873 – 7 January 1934), also known as Ripper Whitehouse, was an English professional footballer who played as a goalkeeper. He played in The Football League for Grimsby Town, Aston Villa, Manchester United and Manchester City, making more than 200 appearances.

== Career ==
Born in Birmingham, Whitehouse began his career with Football Alliance side Birmingham St George's, but when the club was dissolved due to financial difficulties at the end of the 1891–92 season, he joined Grimsby Town, who had just become one of the founder members of the Football League Second Division. In four seasons on the east coast, he became a regular in the first team, making more than 100 league appearances before a move to First Division side Aston Villa in July 1896 for a fee of £200.

Whitehouse began his first season with Aston Villa playing back-up to Tom Wilkes, but soon took over the number 1 jersey and ended up playing in 17 of the first 19 matches of the league season (with the exception of games 1 and 3). Wilkes regained his place in the team following a 4–2 defeat away to Sunderland on 9 January 1897 for a 10-game run that included the first five matches of the FA Cup campaign. However, Whitehouse returned to the team for the last four games of the league season, as well as the FA Cup semi-final and final; they won all six games, with Whitehouse conceding just three goals in the process. Aston Villa were confirmed as the winners of both the league and cup, the first team to win the Double since Preston North End went undefeated throughout the 1888–89 season.

Whitehouse played in the first three matches of the following season, but a prolonged absence meant he missed the next two-and-a-half months, losing his place in the side first to Wilkes and then to Billy George. He returned at the start of December 1897 and played through to the end of the season, but he was unable to prevent Villa from finishing in sixth place in the league, nor from exiting the FA Cup in the first round, following a 1–0 away defeat to Derby County.

At the end of the season, he left Aston Villa for Southern League First Division side Bedminster, where he played for a season before returning to Grimsby Town. He played in 27 of the club's 34 league matches in the 1899–1900 season, before joining fellow Second Division side Newton Heath in September 1900. He remained with the Heathens for almost three seasons, through their change of name to Manchester United in 1902. During his time there, he made 59 league appearances, including one as an emergency inside left in a 1–1 draw against Walsall on 25 February 1901; his selection in the forward line came as a result of the unavailability of William Jackson and his usual deputy Joe Heathcote, while James Garvey took over in goal.

Having lost his place in the side to Herbert Birchenough for much of the first half of the 1902–03 season, Whitehouse left for Manchester City in February 1903. However, his time there lasted only seven months and he moved to Scotland to join Third Lanark in September 1903, but remained an unused backup to Jimmy Raeside as the club won the Scottish Football League title. He returned to England with Hull City a year later, before moving to Southend United in 1905, where he saw out the remaining two seasons of his career.

He died in Hallam Hospital on 7 January 1934.
