= Stillwater River =

Stillwater River may refer to:

== New Zealand ==
- Stillwater River (New Zealand), on the South Island

== United States ==
- Stillwater River (Maine)
- Stillwater River (Nashua River tributary), Massachusetts
- Stillwater River (Stillwater County, Montana), a tributary of the Yellowstone River
- Stillwater River (Flathead County, Montana), a tributary of the Whitefish River
- Stillwater River (Ohio)
- Stillwater River (Rhode Island)

== See also ==
- Stillwater (disambiguation)
