= Ralph Borsodi =

American economist

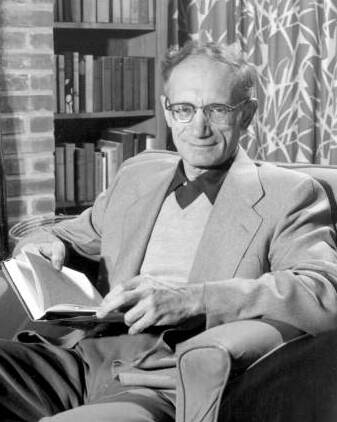
- Borsodi in 1955
- Born: December, 1888
- Died: October 27, 1977 (aged 88); Exeter, New Hampshire
- Occupations: Agrarian theorist and practical experimenter
- Notable work: Flight from the City

Ralph Borsodi (December 1888 – October 27, 1977) was an American agrarian theorist and practical experimenter interested in ways of living useful to the modern family desiring greater self-reliance (especially so during the Great Depression). Much of his theory related to living in rural surroundings on a modern homestead and was rooted in his reading of the writings of Henry George. He also was a political philosopher and social reformer, who criticized the benefits of urban living.

== His life and work ==
Borsodi was cited as an important modern critic and creative thinker by Helen and Scott Nearing in such writings as Living the Good Life, a book sometimes credited as being the clarion call of the back-to-the-land movement of the 1970s. J.I. Rodale, who founded Organic Gardening and Farming magazine got his introduction to organic gardening at Borsodi's Dogwood Acres Homestead, as did the Keene family, founders of Walnut Acres organic food catalog. Borsodi was also a significant influence on the American libertarian movement.

A number of Borsodi's texts can be found in the Social Criticism section of the Soil and Health Online Library.

=== Back-to-the-land advocacy ===
He spent the early years of his life in Manhattan. His father, William, was a publisher with connections in advertising, and Ralph worked in this business as a boy. By the age of 22, Borsodi was personally testing the idea of moving "back to the land." He had fully embraced the concept of simple living by 1920. Borsodi was influenced by the reformer Bolton Hall (1854–1938), a friend of his father's; Hall introduced Borsodi to the ideas of the economist Henry George. Borsodi was also influenced by Thomas Jefferson, Arthur Schopenhauer, Friedrich Nietzsche, Josiah Warren, Lysander Spooner, Benjamin Tucker, and Laurance Labadie.

Borsodi is chiefly known for his practical experiments in self-sufficient living during the 1920s and 1930s and for the books he wrote about these experiments. The Distribution Age (1927), This Ugly Civilization (1929), and Flight from the City (1933) are his best known works. He established a School of Living in Rockland County, New York, during the winter of 1934–1935. Before long, about 20 families began attending regularly from New York City, spending the weekends at the school. Some commentators claim Borsodi's books inspired "hundreds of thousands of people" to follow his example during the Great Depression.

Borsodi launched a community land trust in 1935 as a practical test of his ideas. He set up the non-profit Independence Foundation, Inc., with Chauncey Stillman and others, which acquired a tract of about 40 acres of land on Bayard Lane near Suffern, New York. The homes were owned individually, but the land cooperatively. A group interested in forming a similar community land trust at Stillwater in Ossining, New York, contacted Borsodi. The Stillwater project was unfortunately abandoned by the Independence Foundation in the early stages as unreasonably large, although it did develop along lines similar to Bayard Lane.

In 1937, Borsodi, with Herbert Agar and Chauncey Stillman, started a journal called Free America, which advocated local agrarian democracy. In 1948 Borsodi self-published (even doing his own typesetting) Education and Living, a two-volume work designed to suggest a curriculum for the ongoing School of Living. In 1950, Borsodi moved to the Town of Melbourne Village, whose founders had been influenced by his teachings. Mildred Loomis, his most devoted student, continued the work of the School of Living into the 1970s when it was headquartered at Heathcote Community in Freeland, Maryland.

With Bob Swann, Borsodi created a land trust that functioned as an economic, banking, and credit institution, probably influenced by the ideas of Josiah Warren. Called the Independence Foundation, Inc., Borsodi intended it as a new and ethical way of making low-cost, cooperatively shared credit available to people who wanted to build homesteads in the community. This institution made it possible to provide people access to land without having to pay outright for property initially.

=== Philosopher and social reform ===
Borsodi spent decades analyzing the ills of modern society and imagining remedies for the problems. His 1968 work, published in India, and titled Seventeen Universal Problems of Man and Society, cataloged his research. It can be considered the beginning of a modern taxonomy of human problems and solutions. His followers said he was working at solving some social issues decades earlier than most analysts realized the problem even existed. For example, he predicted the inflation of the 1970s some thirty years before it came.

He was interested in monetary reform and alternative local currency. He experimented with such a currency in his home area, Exeter, New Hampshire; He created a commodity-backed bartering currency called the Constant, reminiscent of Josiah Warren's "labor notes" at the Cincinnati Time Store. These appeared first as paper notes, but in 1974, coin-like pieces, called Globes, were minted and sold in 1/2 ounce and 1 ounce .999 silver denominations. The non-profit organization that sponsored them was the International Foundation for Independence, Inc. The Globes themselves were minted and sold by Arbitrage International. The alternative currency project came to an early end due to Borsodi's failing health and subsequent death.

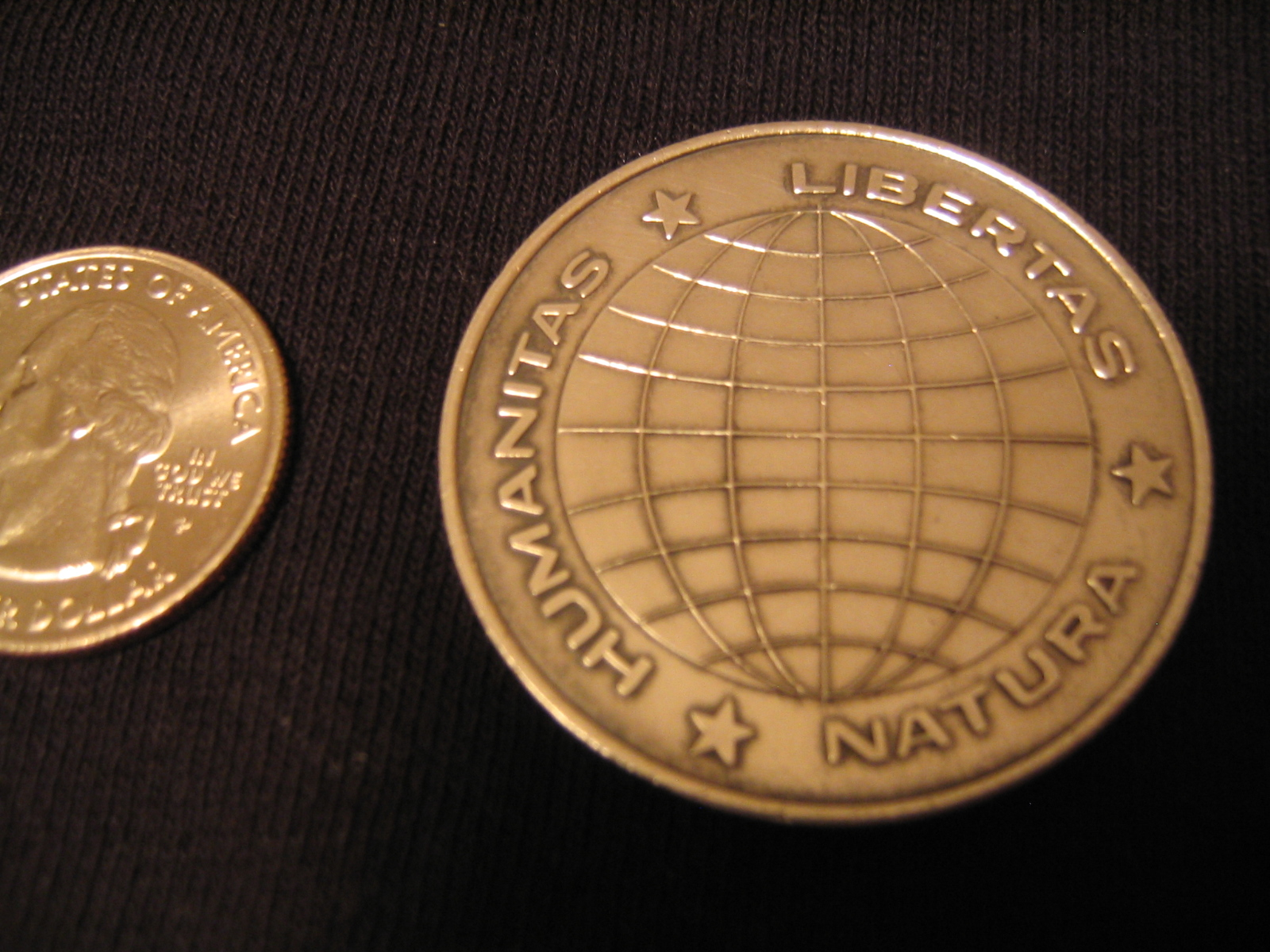
Globe obverse

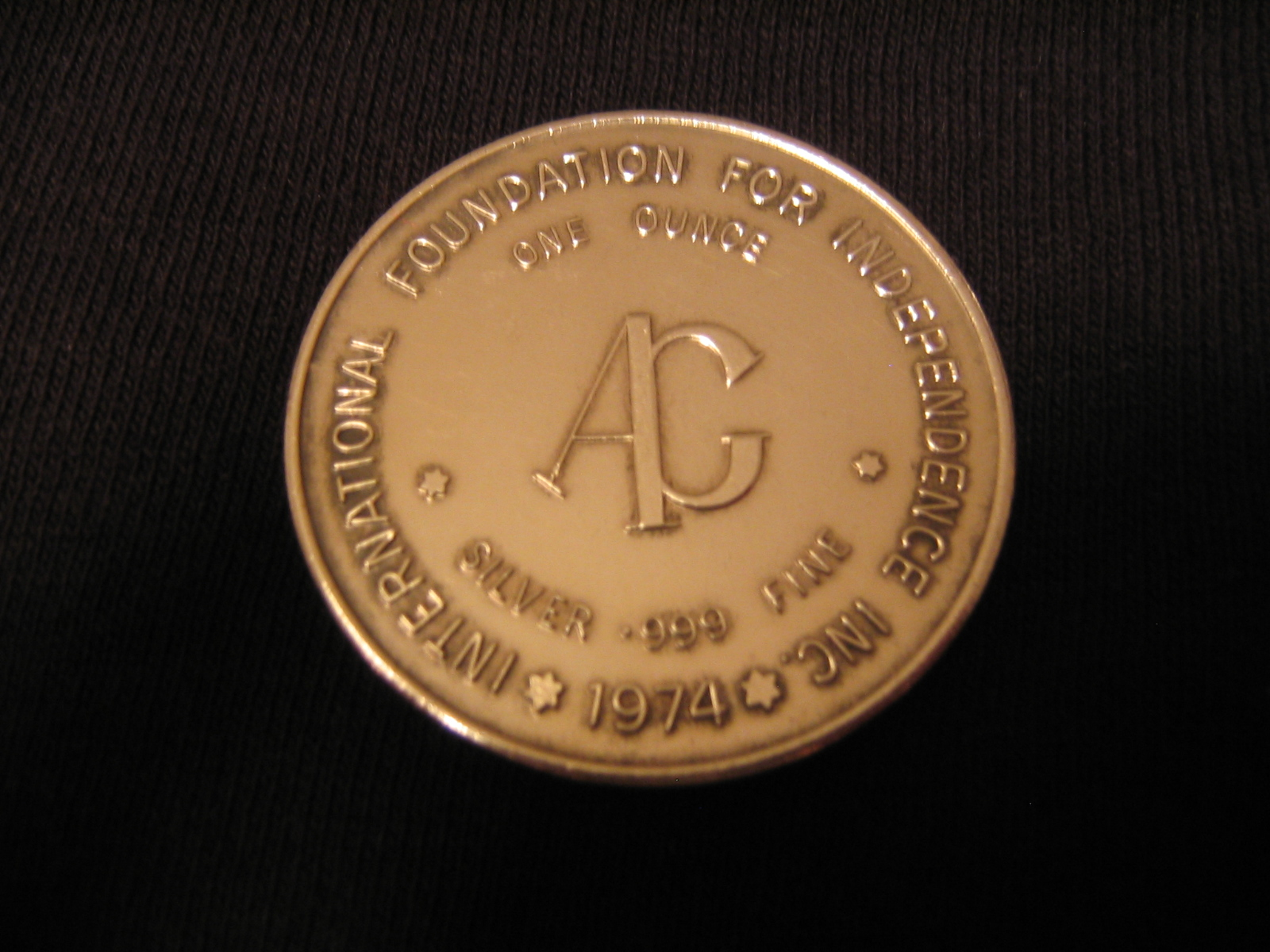
Globe reverse

== Death ==
Borsodi died in Exeter, New Hampshire in October 1977 at the age of 89. He was survived by his wife Clare and two sons - Edward M. and Ralph W. - by his first wife Myrtle Mae Simpson.

== Selected works ==
- National advertising vs. prosperity a study of the economic consequences of national advertising (1923)
- The Distribution Age (1927).
- This Ugly Civilization (1929).
- Flight from the City (1933).
- Prosperity and Security, A Study in Realistic Economics (1938)
- The time has come : an open letter to the teachers of mankind on the question of war and peace and the creation of a really new world order (1942)
- Inflation Is Coming (1948)
- Education and Living (1948)
- The Challenge of Asia : A Study of Conflicting Ideas and Ideals (1956)
- The Definition of Definition: A New Linguistic Approach to the Integration of Knowledge (1967)
- Homestead notes a Journal, published by the School of Living, 1933-?
- The Education of the Whole Man (1963).

== See also ==
- Agrarianism
- Bolton Hall (activist)
- Georgism
- Stephen Pearl Andrews
- Paul Wheaton
- Subsistence Homesteads Division
