= Upper Stillwater =

Upper Stillwater may refer to:

- Upper Stillwater, Maine
- Upper Stillwater Reservoir, Utah
- Upper Stillwater Lake, Montana

== See also ==
- Stillwater (disambiguation)
