= Still waters run deep (disambiguation) =

Still waters run deep is a proverb of Latin origin.

Still waters run deep may also refer to:

- Still Waters Run Deep (album), a 1970 album by Four Tops
- "Still Waters Run Deep", a song by The 69 Eyes from the 2002 album Paris Kills
- "Still Waters (Run Deep)", a 1997 song by the Bee Gees
- Still Waters Run Deep, a play by Tom Taylor (dramatist) first staged in 1855
- Still Waters Run Deep (film), a 1916 British silent film based on the play by Tom Taylor
- Still Waters Run Deep, an alternative translation for the Al Jazeera show The Hidden Is More Immense

== See also ==
- Still Waters (disambiguation)
