= Stillwater Mill =

Textile factory in Rhode Island

Stillwater Worsted Mills
- Location: Woonasquatucket River, Smithfield, Rhode Island
- Coordinates: 41°53′40″N 71°34′30″W

Construction
- Completed: 1872

The Stillwater Mill was a former textile factory located in Smithfield, Rhode Island.

In September 2009, Breakwater Preservation Conservancy was given a donation of some 26 acres of property in Smithfield which included the remaining buildings of the Stillwater Worsted Mills. This was a very exciting acquisition for us as it is not only one of the most scenic locations in Rhode Island but it is also historically unique in that the whole concept of the mill community started on this very spot. During our investigation of T. Levy in 1909 and that the social innovations started there were far ahead of their time, are the creation of the Levy family. This and many other ideas originating at this mill can be argued to have been pivotal events leading towards success in both the first and second world war.

== Early history ==
Native Americans, including the Narragansett tribe, Nipmuck and Wampanoag tribes, occupied Smithfield for thousands of years. Early roads followed presumed Native American trails. Rivers such as the Woonasquatucket and Stillwater River (Rhode Island) were fertile ground for fishing, hunting, gathering and some agriculture. Smithfield was part of the Providence Plantation from 1636, but European settlers did not arrive until 1666 when some moved out from Providence. The Town of Smithfield was named after John Smith, the miller, who was granted land by Roger Williams. Smith was one of the original party of six men headed by Roger Williams, who formed the first settlement in Rhode Island. Settlement in the area to become known as Smithfield proceeded slowly during the 17th century. A limited number of pioneering spirits ventured from the nucleus settlement of Providence into the wilderness of the outlands. In the beginning, these peoples coexisted with the Wampanoag tribe who utilized this vast area for hunting and fishing. The Smithfield of today was called Wionkhiege. In addition to the early colonists from Providence, some Quakers from Massachusetts came here to escape persecution. First families in Smithfield were the Angells, Steeres, Smiths, Applebys, and Farnums, all engaged in farming and in shaping the community. Battles of King Philip's War took place in the vicinity of Nipsachuck Swamp; at a time when colonists had just begun to move into this Tribal area. However, with Philip’s death and the defeat of his allies in 1676 more European settlers moved to the western territories. In 1731 Smithfield was set off from Providence and initially included North Smithfield, Lincoln, Central Falls, and Woonsocket west of the Blackstone River.

== Architectural History ==
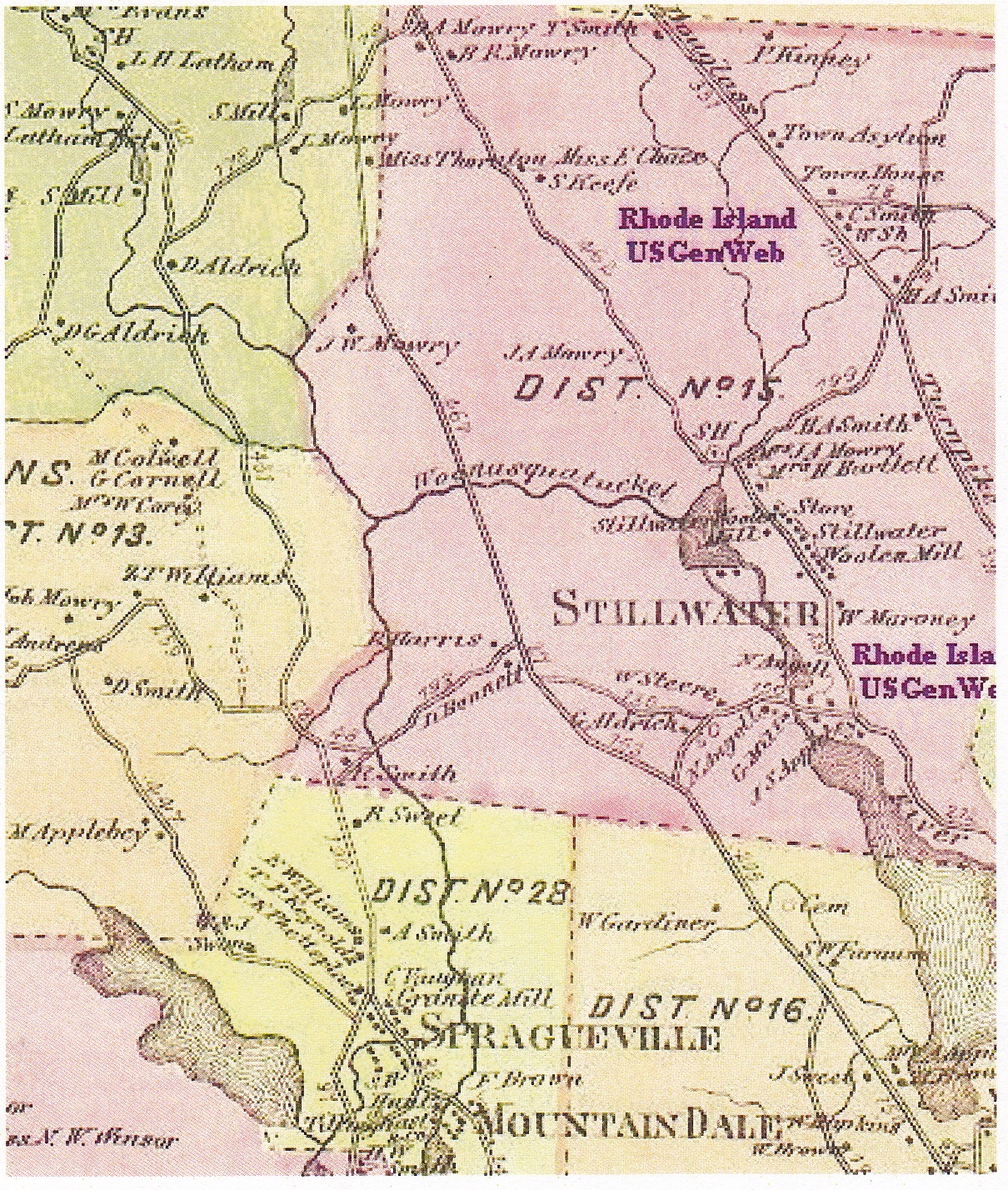
Stillwater mill Beers map 1870

In 1824, Israel and Welcome Arnold purchased property at Stillwater, in central Smithfield, and erected a small cotton mill and two houses for workers. The small settlement was later purchased by Joseph Clark, and by mid-century Stillwater was only a tiny hamlet – a mill, five houses, a school and a store. A new woolen mill, built in 1866 by Edmund Brown, and his partners, burned in 1872, but was immediately replaced by a new and larger mill, constructed to the manufacture of woolen cloth. The village remained small throughout the nineteenth century, with a population of 145 in 1870 and 138 in 1895. The mill owners effected a number of changes in the late nineteenth century, such as landscaping and housing renovations, that transformed Stillwater into a “model village”. Stillwater was also the town's most distinct, compact, self-contained mill village.

The Stillwater River was first used for textile manufacture about 1825, when Thomas Sprague acquired land at Spragueville and built a cotton factory there. In 1853 the Stillwater reservoir was constructed.

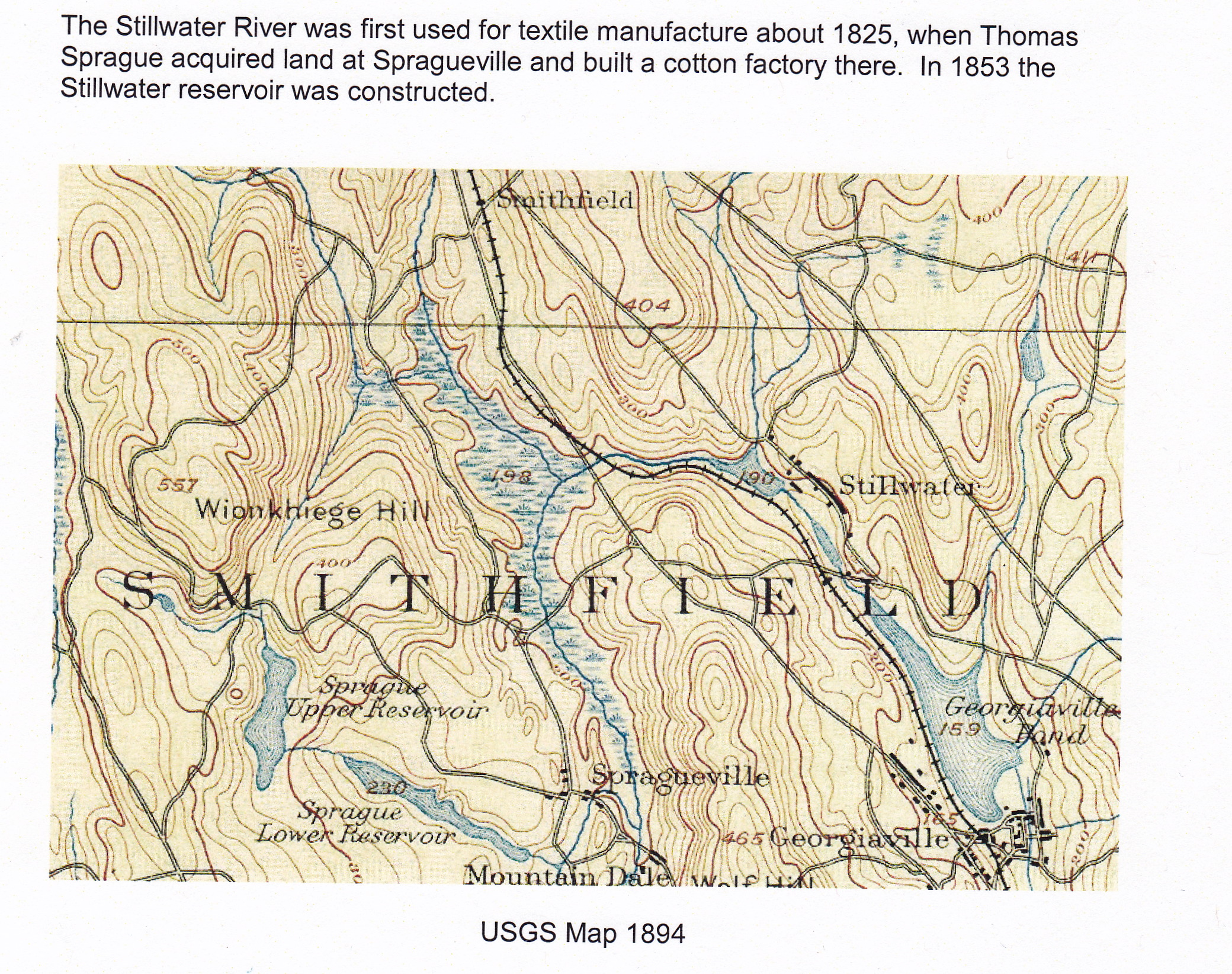
Stillwater mill usgs 1894

In 1873, the Providence and Springfield Railroad was opened in Smithfield. The new line passed through Esmond, Georgiaville, and Stillwater, expediting the flow of raw materials in and manufactured goods out of these villages. Capron's grain mills and Stillwater Worsted Mills were served by Stillwater Station. In order to expand the rail line past the Stillwater Station, the Railroad entered into a tri-party agreement in which the Reservoir Company, the Mill Company and the Railroad agreed that the railroad would be allowed to construct a rail line along the river and pond along the 60 foot shore line owned by the Reservoir and Mill Companies in exchange for the right to access the rail way and the construction and maintenance of the rail spur to the mill. Today the Electric Company has assumed the place of the Railroad and enjoys the use of the 20 foot (one third) share of the shore line. As an interesting side note, the electric company has warrantee deeds for all the other railroad properties it acquired, but only a quitclaim for the Stillwater lands.

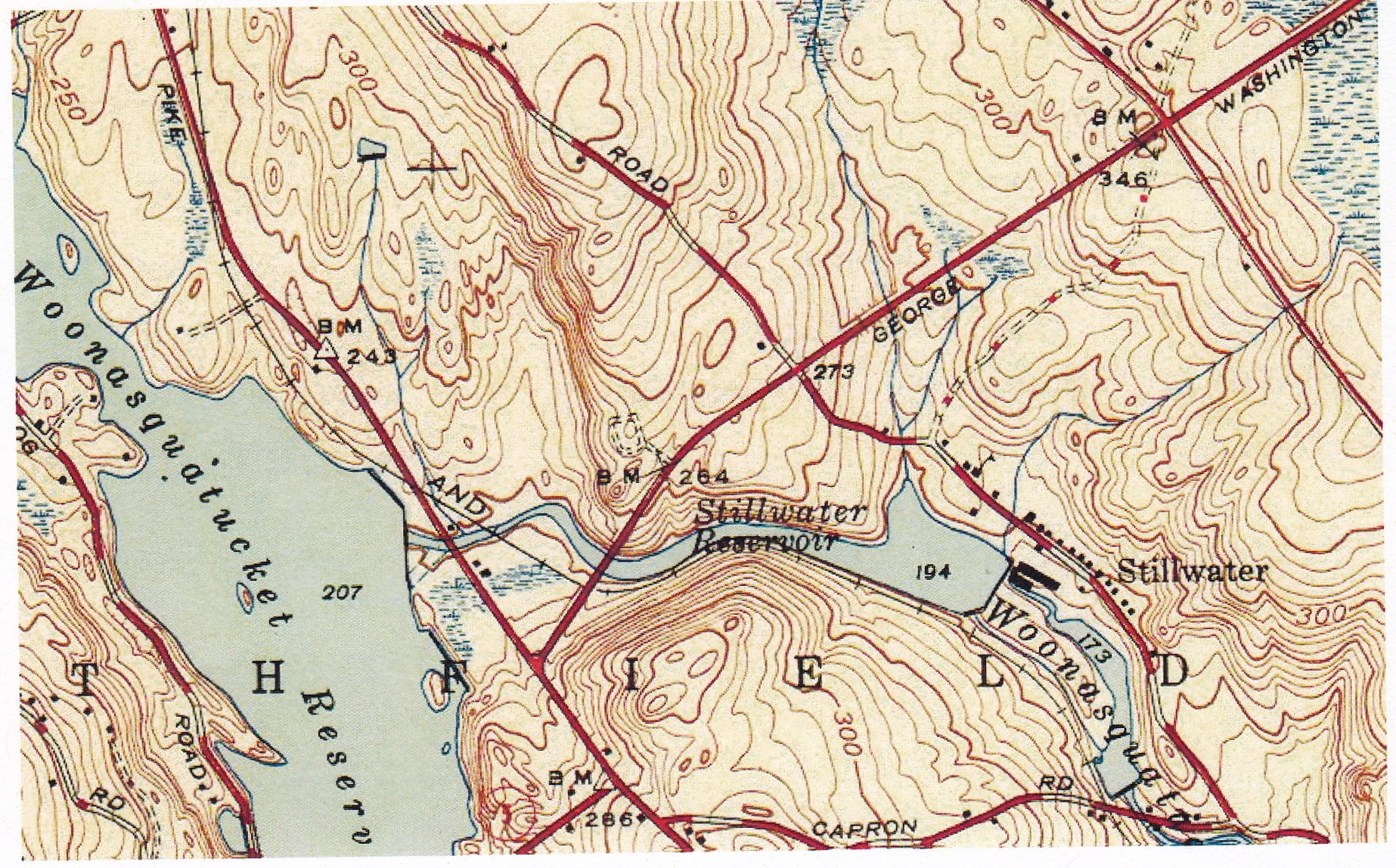
Stillwater mill usgs 1943

The factory at Stillwater was part of the Centerdale Woolen Mills by 1901, and by 1937 became part of the Lister Worsted Company. Stillwater village remained virtually unchanged during this era, its mill employing a modest number of workers (only 150 in 1939), most of whom probably resided in the village.

In the 1960s – 1980's the rate of Smithfield's population growth slowed and the development of suburban tracts shifted to the Limerock road and Bryant College areas. Newer residential development includes structures set in expansive open land, particularly in the south west corner of town and near the Stillwater reservoir.

In 1984 a fire destroyed part of the remaining mill buildings.

== From Mill to Museum ==
Stillwater (upper dam) is listed as having a significant hazard potential. The model assumptions for this characterization need to be clarified. At this point in time the lower dam would appear to be at greater risk of potential failure due to water flow through the structure.

Each phase of Smithfield's past has left physical evidence of itself. This rich heritage should be recognized and appreciated for its present-day value. Smithfield is a beautiful and historic town whose old farms and villages give it special character and vitality. The preservation of this legacy is a challenge to all who share a future vision.

Breakwater Preservation Conservancy has a vision for the future of the Stillwater property that focuses around it being a self-sustaining benefit to the public. We have no profit making goal for the development of the site other that it serve a public benefit as a link to local history, and provides an opportunity for the public to better understand the local ecology and its relationship to sustainable resource preservation.

== See also ==
- Smith-Appleby House
- Woonasquatucket River
- Stillwater River (Rhode Island)

== Gallery ==
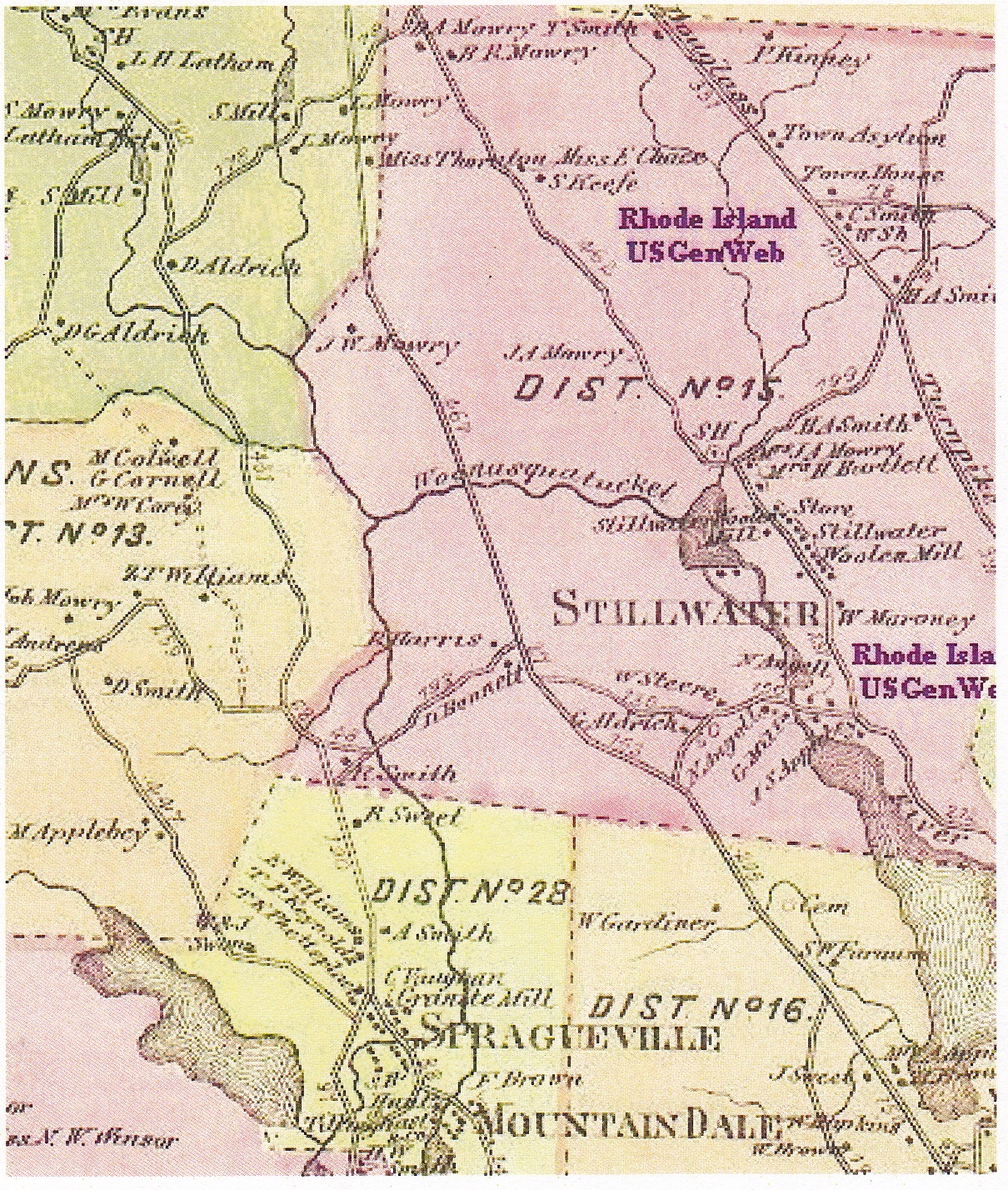
stillwater mill beers map 1870

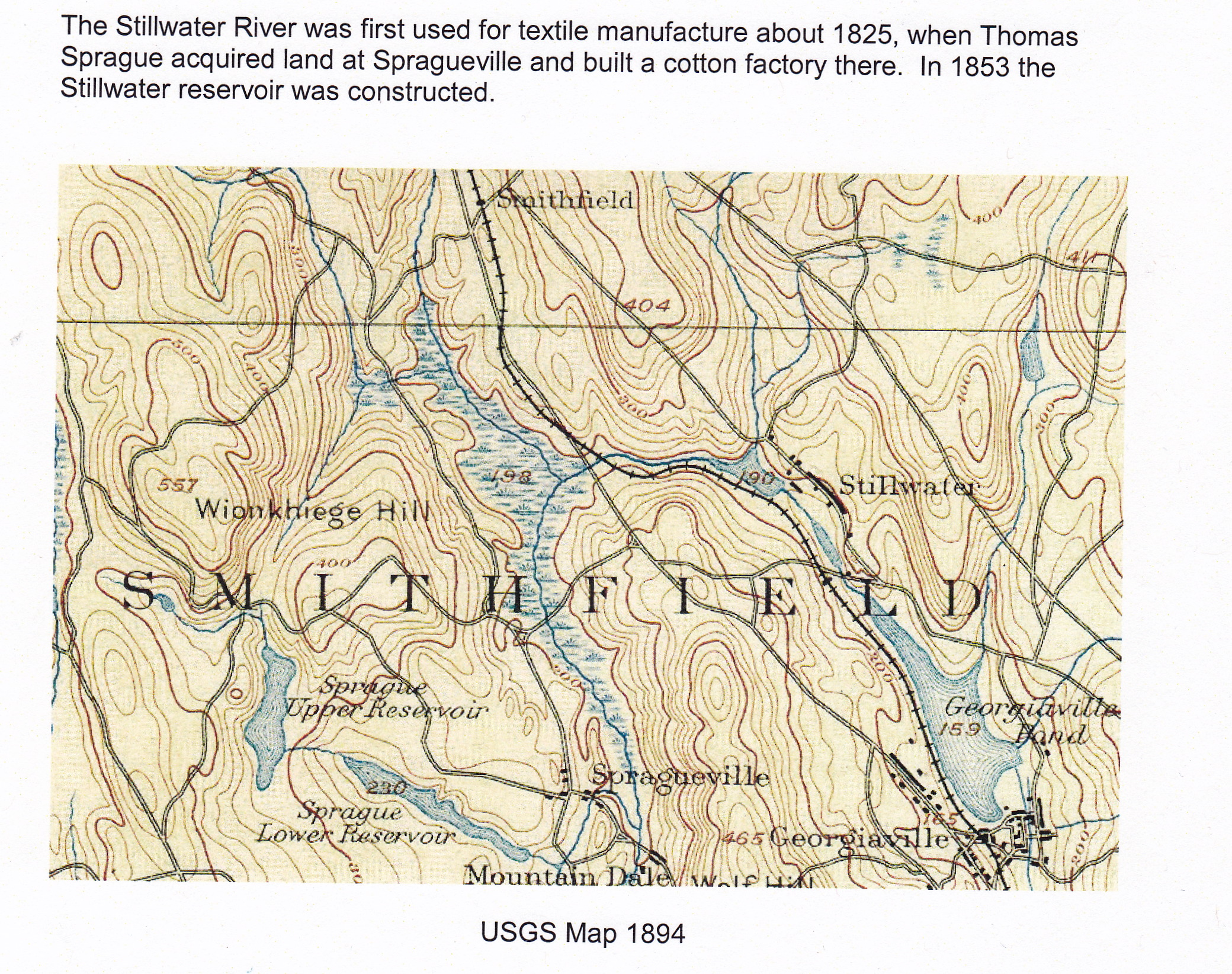
stillwater mill usgs 1894

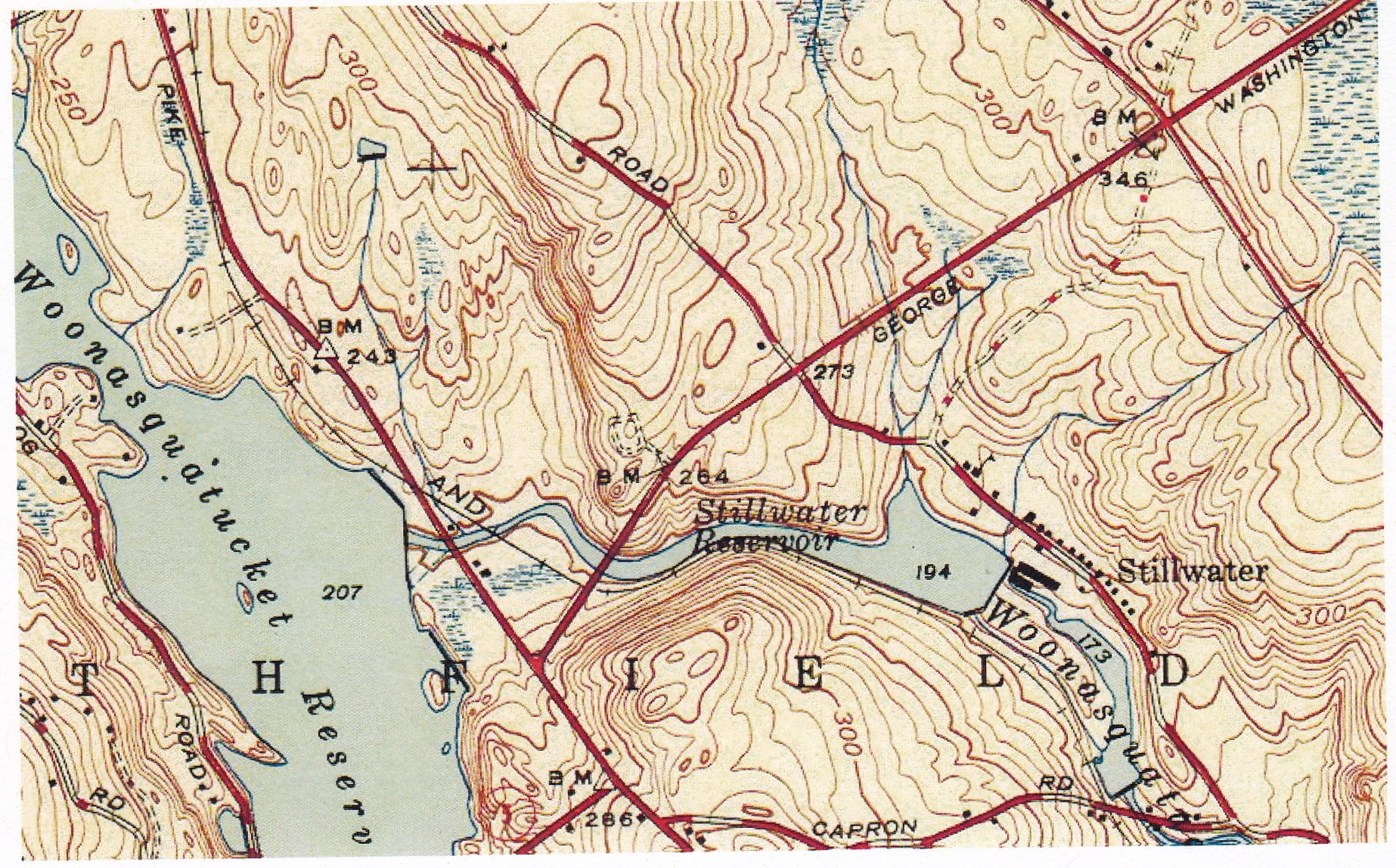
Stillwater mill usgs 1943
