= Stillwater, Ossining =

Community land trust

Coordinates: 41°12′5″N 73°48′46″W

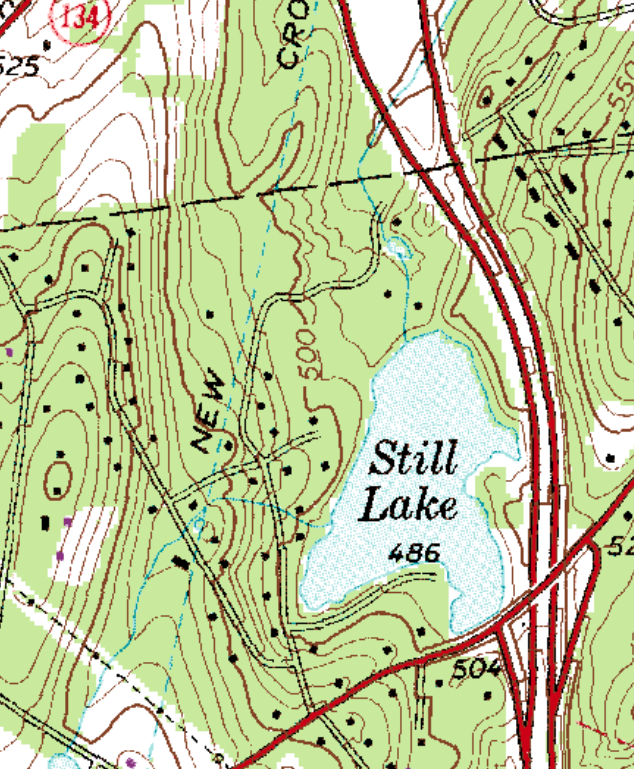
Map of Still Lake and adjacent Stillwater Homesteads. The New Croton Aqueduct is shown as a faint blue dashed line running roughly from northeast (top right) to southwest (bottom left).

Stillwater is a residential community in northern Westchester County, New York. It was conceived by Ralph Borsodi as a community land trust, one of his experiments in the back-to-the-land movement, but the community ceased to be a land trust soon after it was founded. The property owners are members of a homeowner association, the Stillwater Association, Inc., which is responsible for Still Lake, a small private lake within the community, suitable for swimming and small unpowered boats, and skating in winter.

== Geography ==
Stillwater shares the ZIP Code and school district of the town of Ossining, New York, and depends on the Ossining Volunteer Ambulance Corps for emergency ambulance services, but it is physically located in the west end of the neighboring township of New Castle, New York (41°12'3"N 73°48'36"W, 170 m above sea level); it shares the volunteer fire service of the New Castle hamlet of Millwood and is policed by the New Castle police department. Still Lake, also called Stillwater Lake, has an area of about 24 acres. The Taconic State Parkway runs near the eastern shore of the lake, and when the parkway was rebuilt in the 1960's, New York State took possession of the land between the parkway and the lake.

== History ==
In the late nineteenth century the New York Aqueduct Commission built the New Croton Aqueduct, a brick-lined tunnel several hundred feet underground, to supply water from the Croton reservoir to New York City. The aqueduct is shown on a 1914 atlas of Westchester County, passing under property owned by Wilbur D. Titlar. Shaft No. 2 of the aqueduct is near Tate's swamp on the north of the Titlar property. This property of 165 acres was deeded from Mr Titlar in June 1915 to George W. Still, who in 1929 built a dam on the property to create Still Lake .

In the early 1930's Ralph Borsodi set up the Independence Foundation, Inc. with Chauncey Stillman and others to acquire land for homesteading communities. A detailed "Indenture for the Possession of Land" describing the rights and duties of homesteaders was prepared, and in 1935 a community called Bayard Lane was started, near Suffern, New York. Borsodi was then introduced by Mr George Mosel to a group interested in forming a similar community land trust near Ossining, New York, on part of the Still property. Several of the first houses built in Stillwater, sometimes called the "stone houses", have exterior walls of concrete faced with natural stone as proposed by the architect Ernest Flagg to enable construction by unskilled labor. Such Flagg System Homes were also built in the Bayard Lane community.

Unfortunately the Independence Foundation board thought that the Stillwater project was unreasonably large, and encouraged Borsodi to abandon it. When the Foundation dropped the Stillwater project, it ceased to be a community land trust, but the Independence Foundation still owned the land. A revised "Master Contract" was prepared, to replace the "Indenture for the Possession of Land", and Homesteaders who had already built on their plots had their Indentures replaced by mortgages. Homesteaders who had not yet built on their land purchased the land by regular monthly payments. The Stillwater Association remained, to care for the common property, mainly the lake and its borders.

== Notable early residents (1940s) ==
The founding subscribers in 1940 to the Sillwater Association, Inc. were Albert W. Merrick Sr., Allbert W. Merrick Jr., Pierre Bezy, Leon Svirsky and Donn Marvin. Most early residents were attracted by Ralph Borsodi's visions of social reform, including the back-to-the-land movement, and were on the socialist/cooperative/mutualism spectrum. These included

Bea Fetz, daughter of George and Emma Schumm, colleagues of the individualist anarchist Benjamin R.Tucker

Margaret Goldsmith, granddaughter of John Humphrey Noyes, founder of the Oneida Community

Helen and Tom Maley. Helen was a progressive educator of young children. She founded a neighborhood nursery school in the 1940s, and later the Yorktown Community Nursery School. Her husband Tom was a photographer and artist, who founded the Field Gallery on Martha's Vineyard.

Albert W. Merrick Sr., ran as Socialist candidate in the 1932 election for the New York Assembly - Schenectady 2, and received about 4% of the vote. In his professional career, he developed Vitallium, which is still used for artificial joint replacements.

Iris Merrick (wife of Albert W. Merrick Jr.), ballerina and choreographer, trained with Michel Fokine, founded in 1949 and led for 30 years the Westchester Ballet Company.

Leon Svirsky, journalist, Nieman Fellowship at Harvard 1946, managing editor of Scientific American 1948-1958

Oriole Tucker-Riché, daughter of Benjamin R.Tucker

== Notable neighbors ==
At the north end of Still Lake, near the dam but not part of Stillwater Homesteads, were cottages rented from Mrs Still during summers from about 1945 to 1955 by two New York-based musicians and their families, Nadia Reisenberg and her sister Clara Rockmore, née Reisenberg, who performed under her married name. Nadia Reisenberg was a pianist. Her son Robert Sherman is a music critic and broadcaster, who maintained his interests and property ownership in Stillwater and the neighborhood since his summers there as a young man. Clara Rockmore trained as a violinist but abandoned the instrument due to an arthritic problem, and after meeting Leon Theremin she became proficient on the electronic instrument he had invented, the theremin. She also went on tour with her close family friend the singer Paul Robeson, and offered him sanctuary in her cottage at Still Lake after the Peekskill riots in 1949 (Peekskill is only about 10 miles from Stillwater).

In 1927 George Gershwin and Ira Gershwin leased Chumleigh Farm estate, where most of the songs for Strike Up the Band (musical) were written. The estate, just to the west of Stillwater, also became a social center for visits from the Gershwins' New York friends.

A mile or so west of Stillwater was the home of actors Jose Ferrer and Uta Hagen. The nearby Westchester Playhouse in Mt. Kisco, one of the best summer-stock theaters in the New York area during 1932-1940, helped launch the careers of these actors.
