= Stillwater Township =

Stillwater Township may refer to:

- Stillwater Township, Washington County, Minnesota
- Stillwater Township, New Jersey
- Stillwater Township, North Dakota
- Stillwater Township, a former township in Payne County, Oklahoma

== See also ==
- Stillwater (disambiguation)
