= James Garvey (footballer) =

English footballer

Personal information
- Full name: James Patrick Garvey
- Date of birth: Q1 1878
- Place of birth: Hulme, England
- Position: Goalkeeper

Senior career*
Years	Team	Apps	(Gls)
- Wigan County
1900–1901	Newton Heath	6	(0)
- Middleton
- Stalybridge Rovers
1902–1905	Southport Central		
1905	Bradford City	22	(0)
Total		28	(0)
- * Club domestic league appearances and goals

James Patrick Garvey (Q1 1878 – after 1905) was an English professional footballer who played as a goalkeeper.

== Career ==
Born in Hulme, Garvey began his career with Wigan County in the Lancashire League. He joined Newton Heath in May 1900 as a replacement for Scotland international goalkeeper Frank Barrett, who had moved to New Brighton Tower. He made his Football League debut in the opening game of the 1900–01 season away to Glossop; he conceded just one goal, but Newton Heath were unable to score themselves and they lost 1–0. Garvey kept a clean sheet in Newton Heath's next game, a 4–0 home win over Middlesbrough, but was replaced for the next game by Jimmy Whitehouse, newly signed from Grimsby Town. He only made four more appearances before the end of the season, one of these coming as a result of Whitehouse's selection as an emergency forward against Walsall. He spent most of the rest of the season in the club's reserve team; one notable appearance in December 1900 saw him save a penalty as Newton Heath – whose team consisted of just nine men – held Glossop to a 1–1 draw.

Having failed to establish himself in the Newton Heath first team, he left the club for non-league Middleton in June 1901. After a spell with Stalybridge Rovers, he joined Southport Central ahead of the 1902–03 season. In December 1902, he returned to Newton Heath (now known as Manchester United) with Southport when they were drawn together in the third qualifying round of the 1902–03 FA Cup; although Manchester United won 4–1, Garvey had a good game, saving a penalty from Jack Peddie to keep the score relatively respectable. In March 1904, he was part of the Southport team that reached the final of the Lancashire Senior Cup, where they lost 2–0 to Blackburn Rovers at Deepdale in Preston.

He returned to the Football League with Bradford City in February 1905. He made 22 league appearances for Bradford before suffering a career-ending injury in a game against Stockport County in November 1905.
