= Assapumpset Brook =

Location
- Country: United States
- State: Rhode Island
- Region: Providence County
- Municipality: Johnston

Physical characteristics
- Source
  - coordinates: 41°51′26″N 71°31′27″W
- Mouth: Woonasquatucket River
  - coordinates: 41°50′37″N 71°28′47″W
  - elevation: 75 ft (23 m)
- Length: 5.9 mi (9.5 km)

Assapumpset Brook is a 5.9-mile (9.5 km) long waterway in Johnston, Rhode Island, United States. It feeds the Woonasquatucket River and is considered part of the drainage basin variously termed the Narragansett Watershed or the Woonasquatucket River Watershed.

== Variant names ==
- Assapumsic
- Ossopimsuck
- Assapumsick Brook
- Assapumsik Brook
- Assopumsett Brook
- Oesapimsuck Brook
