= Heathcote Lake =

Lake in Ontario, Canada

- Location within Ontario
- Location: Wabakimi Provincial Park, Thunder Bay District, Ontario
- Coordinates: 50.283611°N 90.385°W
- Primary inflows: Flindt River, Manion Creek
- Primary outflows: narrows to Heafur Lake
- Basin countries: Canada
- Surface area: 22 km^{2} (8.5 sq mi)
- Shore length^{1}: 54 km (34 mi)
- Surface elevation: 408 m (1,339 ft)
- ^{1} Shore length is not a well-defined measure.

Heathcote Lake is a lake in Thunder Bay District, Ontario, Canada. The lake lies in Wabakimi Provincial Park, and is part of the Flindt River system, in the Albany River drainage basin. The Flindt River is one of the lake's main inflows (50.228056°N 90.466944°W). Other inflows include Manion Creek ( 50.218889°N 90.448056°W). The outflow of the lake is a narrows to Heafur Lake (50.316667°N 90.309167°W).

The Canadian National Railway transcontinental mainline crosses the lake on an embankment at Flindt Landing.
