= Manion Creek =

Creek in British Columbia, Canada

Coordinates: 49°32′N 120°47′W

Manion Creek is a creek located in the Similkameen region of British Columbia. It flows into the Tulameen River from the south. Manion Creek is located one and a half miles up-river from the village of Tulameen, British Columbia. Manion Creek was originally called Cedar Creek. It was discovered in 1885 and mined for gold. Platinum has also been recovered from this creek.
