= John Heathcote =

John Heathcote may refer to:

- Sir John Heathcote, 2nd Baronet (1689–1759), MP for Grantham and Bodmin
- John Heathcote (died 1795) (c. 1727–1795), MP for Rutland
- John Edensor Heathcote (died 1822), British industrialist
- John Heathcote (footballer) (1934–2008), Carlton Australian rules footballer from Victoria
- John Heathcote (1767–1838), MP for Ripon 1798–1806
- John Heathcote (cricketer) (1800–1897), English cricketer
- John Moyer Heathcote (1834–1912), English barrister and real tennis player

== See also ==
- John Heathcoat (1783–1861), British inventor and MP for Tiverton
