= Montebello, New York =

- Village
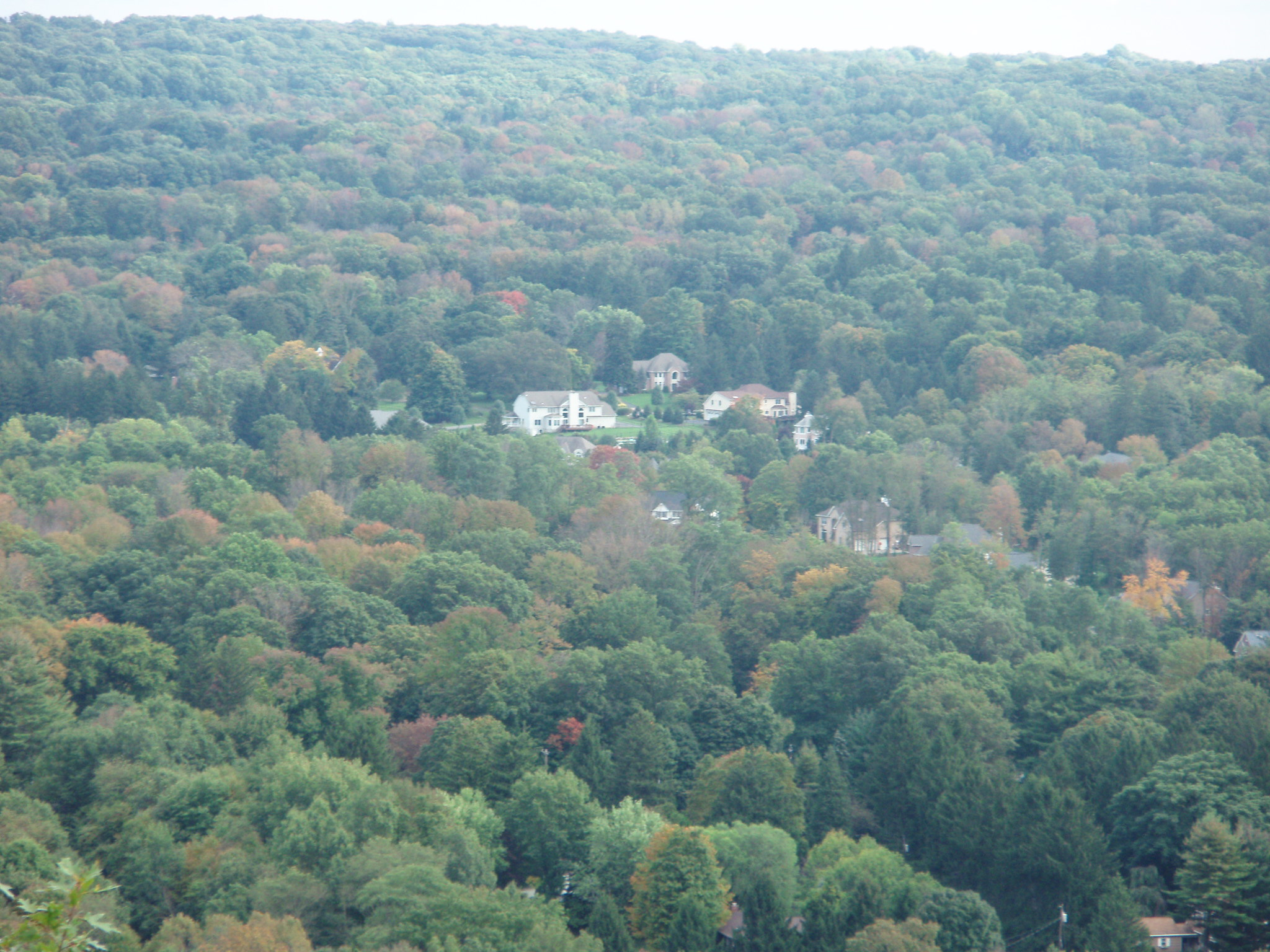
- Overhead view of Montebello

- Location in Rockland County and the state of New York.

- Location within the state of New York
- Coordinates: 41°7′39″N 74°7′9″W
- Country: United States
- State: New York
- County: Rockland
- Town: Ramapo
- Incorporated: May 7, 1986

Government
  - Mayor: Lance N. Millman
  - Deputy Mayor: Stacy Caridi
  - Trustees: Bruce Egenhauser, Michael Humphrey, and David Rose

Area
  - Total: 4.33 sq mi (11.22 km^{2})
  - Land: 4.32 sq mi (11.19 km^{2})
  - Water: 0.0077 sq mi (0.02 km^{2})
- Elevation: 318 ft (97 m)

Population (2020)
  - Total: 4,507
  - Density: 1,043.1/sq mi (402.75/km^{2})
- Time zone: UTC-5 (Eastern (EST))
  - Summer (DST): UTC-4 (EDT)
- ZIP code: 10901
- Area code: 845
- FIPS code: 36-48090
- GNIS feature ID: 0979939
- Website: http://www.montebellony.gov/

Montebello (English pronunciation: /ˈmɒntəbɛːloʊ/ Italian: "beautiful mountain") is an incorporated village in Ramapo, Rockland County, New York, United States. It is located north of Suffern, east of Hillburn, south of Wesley Hills, and west of Airmont. The population was 4,507 at the 2020 census.

== Geography ==
Montebello is located at 41°7′39″N 74°7′9″W (41.127595, -74.119196).

According to the United States Census Bureau, the village has a total area of 4.4 square miles (11 km^{2}), all land.

The road system within the village totals 20.98 miles (33.76 km). Of this, 1.97 miles (3.17 km) are state roads, 6.23 miles (10.03 km) are county roads and 12.78 miles (20.57 km) are village roads. The major arteries include U.S. Route 202, the New York State Thruway (Exit 14B is within the village), and county roads including Airmont, Hemion, Montebello (portion), Spook Rock, and Viola roads, and Grandview Avenue and Dunnigan Drive.

== Demographics ==
Historical population
| Census | Pop. | Note | %± |
|---|---|---|---|
| 1990 | 2,950 | | — |
| 2000 | 3,688 | | 25.0% |
| 2010 | 4,526 | | 22.7% |
| 2020 | 4,507 | | −0.4% |
U.S. Decennial Census

=== 2020 census ===
As of the 2020 census, Montebello had a population of 4,507. The median age was 46.0 years. 22.3% of residents were under the age of 18 and 18.9% of residents were 65 years of age or older. For every 100 females there were 94.8 males, and for every 100 females age 18 and over there were 91.0 males age 18 and over.

100.0% of residents lived in urban areas, while 0.0% lived in rural areas.

There were 1,498 households in Montebello, of which 37.7% had children under the age of 18 living in them. Of all households, 68.9% were married-couple households, 9.1% were households with a male householder and no spouse or partner present, and 19.1% were households with a female householder and no spouse or partner present. About 18.4% of all households were made up of individuals and 13.6% had someone living alone who was 65 years of age or older.

There were 1,587 housing units, of which 5.6% were vacant. The homeowner vacancy rate was 1.2% and the rental vacancy rate was 3.1%.

Racial composition as of the 2020 census
| Race | Number | Percent |
|---|---|---|
| White | 3,526 | 78.2% |
| Black or African American | 269 | 6.0% |
| American Indian and Alaska Native | 1 | 0.0% |
| Asian | 339 | 7.5% |
| Native Hawaiian and Other Pacific Islander | 1 | 0.0% |
| Some other race | 124 | 2.8% |
| Two or more races | 247 | 5.5% |
| Hispanic or Latino (of any race) | 336 | 7.5% |

=== 2000 census ===
As of the census of 2000, there were 3,688 people, 1,163 households, and 1,023 families residing in the village. The population density was 845.1 inhabitants per square mile (326.3/km^{2}). There were 1,182 housing units at an average density of 270.9 per square mile (104.6/km^{2}). The racial makeup of the village was 92.79% white, 2.74% African American, 0.11% Native American, 2.68% Asian, 0.81% from other races, and 0.87% from two or more races. Hispanic or Latino of any race were 2.96% of the population.

There were 1,163 households, out of which 49.9% had children under 18, 81.7% were married couples living together, 4.8% had a female householder with no husband present, and 12.0% were non-families. 9.6% of all households were made up of individuals, and 3.9% had someone living alone who was 65 years of age or older. The average household size was 3.14 and the average family size was 3.36.

In the village, the population was spread out, with 32.1% under the age of 18, 4.3% from 18 to 24, 28.1% from 25 to 44, 27.3% from 45 to 64, and 8.2% who were 65 years of age or older. The median age was 38 years. For every 100 females, there were 97.7 males. For every 100 females age 18 and over, there were 92.6 males.

The median income for a household in the village was $116,600, and the median income for a family was $114,890. Males had a median income of $87,058 versus $41,250 for females. The per capita income for the village was $44,098. About 2.4% of families and 3.3% of the population were below the poverty line, including 3.3% of those under age 18 and none of those age 65 or over.

== History ==
=== Early history ===
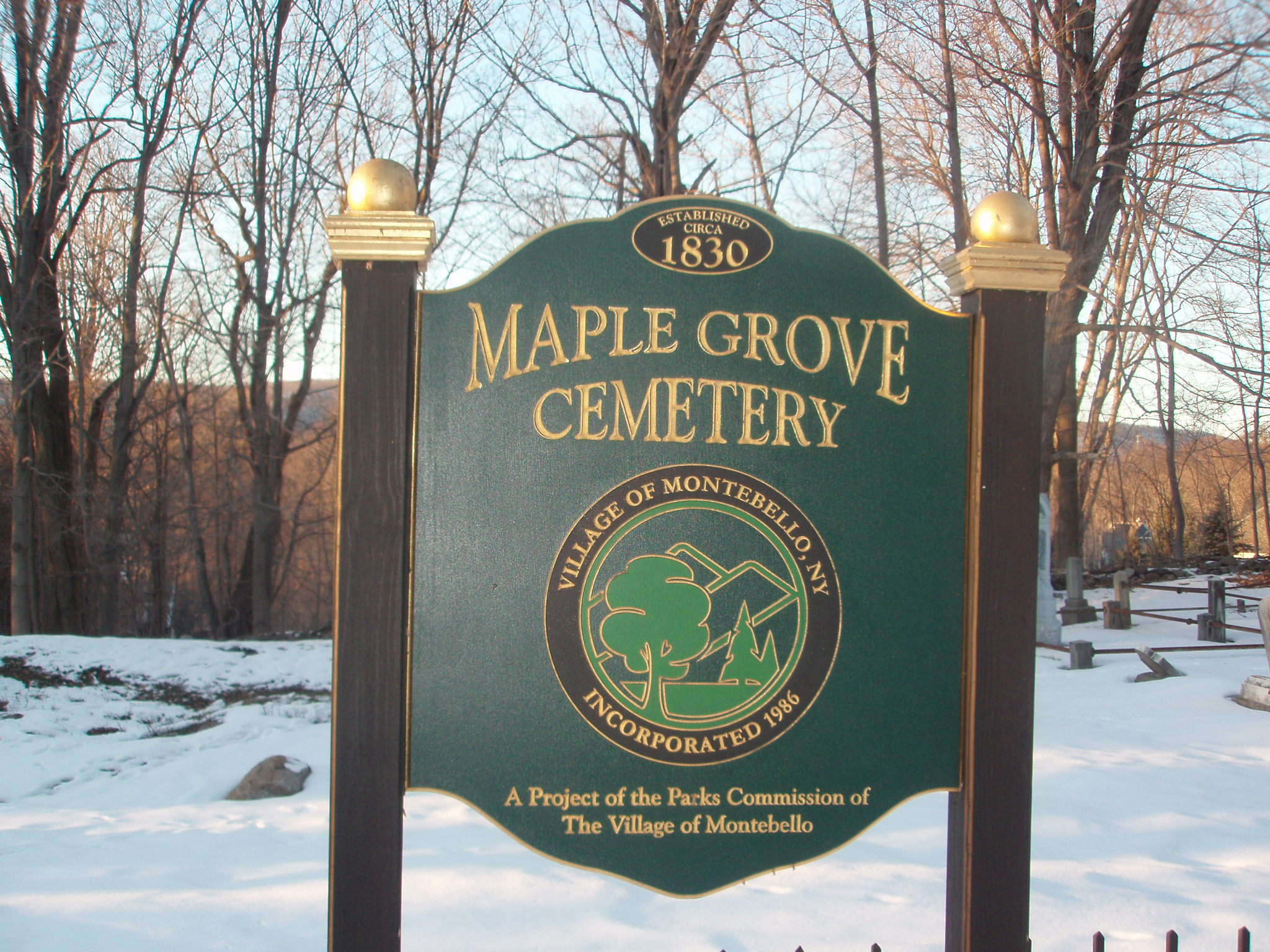
Maple Grove Cemetery (est. 1830) in Montebello, NY

Montebello far exceeds the formal boundaries of the incorporated village today. The rolling hills and fertile soil in the Ramapo Valley provided a quiet, unassuming way of life for the early pioneering families. A small collection of farms and mills dotted the countryside and were connected by dirt paths and rugged roadways. That was all about to change with the coming of the iron rails and the trains that would ride them. In neighboring Suffern, the Erie Railroad began operating in 1841, and with it, exposed the area to sights and sounds never imagined.

=== Erie Railroad ===
Suffern became an important and busy station on the mainline of the Erie Railroad. New Yorkers, in search of a cool, quiet retreat to relieve the stress of their urban lifestyles, filled the passenger trains bound in summer for the surrounding rural regions. Relatively isolated before the 1860s, Suffern served as a welcome mat for the upstate Erie traveler. Twenty trains a day, loaded with seasonal tourists, stopped at the impressive Victorian depot. Word soon spread among the travelers that "romantic scenery, fascinating beauty and rich land" could be found at the "pleasant summer resort". Suffern played host to the traveling public, whether accepting the hospitality offered by the resort hotels and boarding houses or just switching trains. The list of guests, visitors, and part-time residents who were attracted to Suffern's rural charm included the names of many families from New York's affluent "upper crust". Some came as seasonal vacationers, closing to rent an estate, while others bought the property from the abundant amount of undeveloped land. Picturesque rolling hills and vast wooded lands guarded by the Ramapo Mountains provided a rustic setting for the development of elegant country estates.

=== Montebello Estate ===
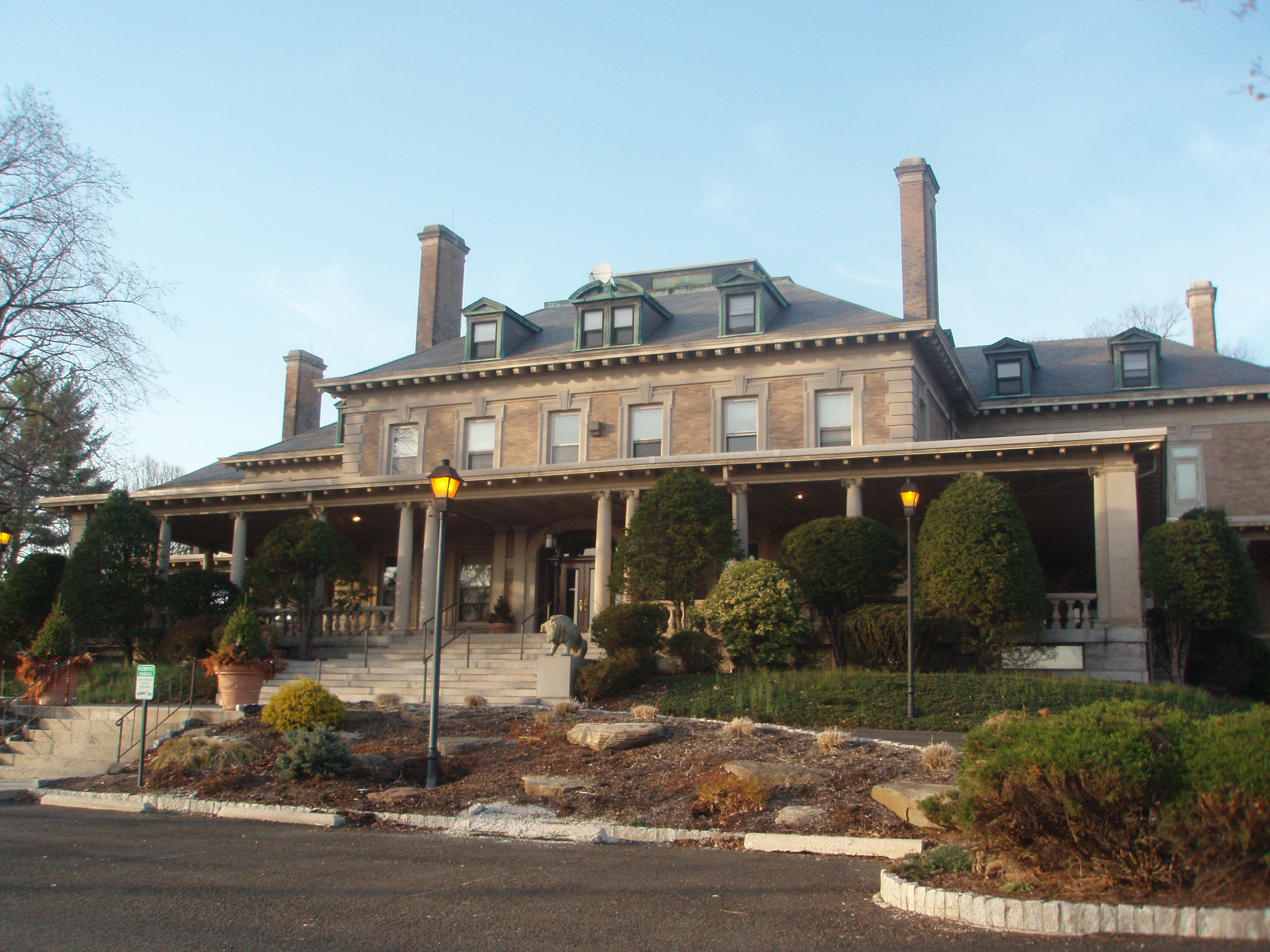
Mansion of the Ryan family in Montebello, NY

One such estate was that of wealthy New York financier Thomas Fortune Ryan. In August 1887, the Ryans purchased the former Groesbeck mansion, which was built in the 1860s. From the hilltop, the estate had a commanding view of the Ramapo Mountains. The Ryans called their estate "Montebello". Within three years, they had the elegant frame dwelling torn down and replaced with a large brick and stone mansion at the cost of $600,000. The new summer home contained such amenities as a two-lane bowling alley, an electric elevator, a private chapel, greenhouse, 13 fireplaces, and in all, over 44 rooms. The estate comprises 1,000 acres (4.0 km^{2}) and has a working farm, not including the 5 smaller "mansions" the Ryans built for their sons in the area, some of which are still standing today.

Aside from a fashionable home on Fifth Avenue, the Ryans maintained homes in Washington, D.C., and Lovingston, Virginia, all reflecting the wealth of one of America's most prosperous and devoutly religious Irish Catholic families. Thomas Fortune Ryan's riches were in vast contrast with his humble beginnings in rural Nelson County, Virginia. Orphaned at age nine, Ryan would eventually become the tenth wealthiest man in the nation. After leaving his native state in 1868, he traveled to Baltimore, Maryland, and found a job in the dry goods business of John S. Barry, a highly successful entrepreneur. It was at this time that Ryan met Ida M. Barry, the boss's daughter, whom he later married. Using his wife's wealth as a foundation on which to build his own, Ryan launched his business career. After moving to New York, at age 23 became the youngest man ever to hold a seat on the New York Stock Exchange. From there Ryan amassed millions in urban transit, railroads, tobacco, insurance, banking, rubber, diamonds, and even the Thompson submachine gun.

The Ryans were as generous to philanthropies as they were rich. It has been estimated that Mrs. Ryan gave $20 million to various charities and endowments across the country. Most of these were affiliated with the Roman Catholic Church; however, there were sizable donations to nonsectarian institutions as well. By 1905 it was reported that Mrs. Ryan's munificence covered the building of "at least one hundred new chapels, schools, churches, hospitals, homes for Sisters of Charity and homes for the aged and infirmed". Mrs. Ryan displayed a special fondness for her new neighbors by contributing equipment to the newly formed Suffern Fire Department. She also built a new church and established a girls' school and a seminary in Suffern, among other things. Shortly after the turn of the 20th century, she turned her attention to the health needs of the community and started Good Samaritan Hospital.

After Mrs. Ryan died in 1917, Ryan divided up the estate and in 1921 sold the main mansion to Edward Swann, New York City District Attorney. Several months later, Swann sold the property to the Archdiocese of New York, which used the mansion as a retreat site for St. Joseph's College and Seminary. In 1944, Suffern resident Gustav Mayer purchased the mansion. However, his plans to develop the property, including possibly as a country club, never materialized, and the vacant mansion fell victim to vandals. Copper mining giant Phelps Dodge Corporation bought the dilapidated mansion in 1951 and used it as their corporate records headquarters for the next 31 years. After Phelps Dodge relocated, it sold the mansion for $1.6 million to Gary M. Goldberg, CEO of the investment/financial planning firm which bears his name. After a year of extensive renovation, Montebello became that financial firm's headquarters as well as an office park.

== Education ==
The village of Montebello is located within the Suffern Central School District. Montebello Elementary School is located within village limits, and serves much of the village. Students in grades 6-8 and zoned to Suffern Middle School, and all high school students are zoned to Suffern High School.

Rockland Community College, part of the SUNY system, is located just outside village limits.

== Historical markers ==
=== Bayard Lane ===
"Turning off the Haverstraw Rd, almost opposite the house of Senator Royal S. Copeland, into a dirt avenue, one is faced by a waste-land of scrub oak and sassafras with a lonely shack near the entrance." This is how a visitor described the Bayard Lane community, a small "Utopia" homestead project, made up of a group of self-sufficient, self-sustaining colonists in 1936.

Beyond the initial appearance lay the successful homestead project, the brainchild of Ralph Borsodi, nationally known author, economist and philosopher. It was his vision to develop a domestic lifestyle that was productive, independent and economically practical for the New York City commuter. Borsodi, a wiry, shock-haired little man who wore horn-rimmed glasses and paid "little attention to his clothes", began his new style of country living, later labeled as "agrarianism for commuters", in 1919. He, along with his wife and two sons, moved from New York City and rented a small unimproved farmhouse near Suffern. While Borsodi commuted to work in the city, they began their initial family experiments. Within a 15-year period, he and his family, tested their theories and dreams of self-subsistence and economic freedom while enjoying the beauty of nature.

Authoring several books on economics, Borsodi's work, This Ugly Civilization, published in 1929, brought him national attention. Four years later, his bestselling book, Flight from the City, appeared as the country was mired in the depths of the Great Depression. Firing the imagination of struggling families, many with low-paying inner city jobs and an aimless future, the book described a way to seek out a good agrarian lifestyle and graphically detailed his own family's experiences and accomplishments at homesteading in Suffern. In 1935, Borsodi launched Bayard Lane, a small experimental cooperative community on a rolling unimproved tract of 40 acres (160,000 m^{2}) at the foot of the Ramapo Mountains.

The property was acquired by the Independence Foundation, a nonprofit cooperative and self-governing group of which Borsodi was a trustee. The other members were Samuel D. Dodge, Clarence E. Pickett, Dr. Harold Rugg, Beveridge C. Dunlop, W. Van Alan Clark, Mrs. Elizabeth Macdonald, Mrs. William Sargent Ladd and Dr. Warren Wilson. They divided the estate into 1-to-2-acre (4,000 to 8,100 m^{2}) homesteads occupied by individual families. The homes were owned individually, the land cooperatively. The Foundation indentured the land to the homeowner through a corporation representing them. Fourteen families who knew Borsodi or who had heard of his project were willing to try the experiment after those interested in the idea had been "philosophically initiated the previous January", The New York Times reported.

Ground was broken for the first house (Marquart residence, #14 Bayard Lane) on June 23, 1935. Using the Ernest Flagg method of construction, they built attractive, economical, sturdy homes of native fieldstone. Each house had all the modern conveniences of the day. It was said, they "will be standing at least a hundred years after they are paid for." Homes could be constructed by various building craft guilds under a special arrangement with the Independence Foundation. A professional staff would provide architects, estimates, record keeping and construction. The benefits to the homeowners were considerable. They could do as much of the work themselves as they wished, calling in help whenever needed. The Foundation would also offer loan contracts. To prevent substandard, unattractive buildings, construction plans were reviewed by a committee.

The School of Living was literally and figuratively the centerpiece of Borsodi's experiment in homesteading, headquartered at 21 Bayard Lane in 1938. Dedicated on Independence Day to the "economic independence of the American people", the School of Living was to develop research and promote the Borsodi philosophy of balanced and healthy living in which the home and the land were productive instruments. The school taught the essentials of do-it-yourself agrarianism, including caning, poultry raising, animal husbandry, masonry, carpentry, and use of tools and household equipment.

Borsodi's "Bayard Lane Utopia" appeared to be a great idea on paper, and initially it appeared to be successful and was prominently featured in a variety of national publications. A group near Ossining, New York, hoped to start a similar project (Stillwater, Ossining) with the help of the Independence Foundation, and made overtures to Borsodi. But as the United States entered the Second World War, the economy shifted and society began to change. A new wave of patriotism swept the country, leading Bayard Lane residents to distance themselves from Borsodi's self-sufficient principles and cooperative living. Eventually, Borsodi resigned from the Foundation, and in time, many of the original families living in this small enclave moved away.

In 1992, two historical markers were erected along U.S. Route 202 to recount the legacy left by the nearly forgotten experimental community whose new style of country living received national attention in the 1930s, and gave hope and inspiration to struggling families of the Depression.

=== Cobblestone Farm ===
A notable landmark in the village of Montebello is Cobblestone Farm. The setting for this estate is an attractive 35 acres (140,000 m^{2}) of well-groomed land on Viola Road. It was once the home of White Laboratories founder and vice president Henry von L. Meyer, Sr.

In 1907, Meyer carefully chose 200 acres (0.81 km^{2}) from the abundant, rural Ramapo landscape, for the creation of an elegant county estate and working farm. Among the rolling hills, century-old trees, and beautiful mountain vistas, he carved "one of the model showplaces in Rockland County", as reported by The New York Times. Part of this extensive property today is dotted with private homes as well as the site of Suffern High School. The farm's centerpiece was a cobblestone barn/carriage house, built with the stones cleared from the fields, hence the name Cobblestone Farm. Handsome stone walls outlined the estate's boundaries. Additional outbuildings were constructed to form an attractive ensemble of farm buildings, including a massive timberframe dairy barn with caretaker's cottage. Several ponds were formed, and one-third of the acreage was put under cultivation. Thousands of vegetables and flowering plants were raised and donated to local charities and hospitals.

The estate's owner was a descendant of an old Colonial family from Long Island. His cousin, George von L. Meyer, was Secretary of the Navy under President Theodore Roosevelt and served as an ambassador to several countries. Henry von L. Meyer was a prominent businessman, and after a number of years in the paper manufacturing business, he entered the drug manufacturing field and became vice president of Health Products Company in New York City. He later founded White Laboratories in Newark, New Jersey, which manufactured many nationally known drug products such as Feenamint, Aspergum and a number of cod liver oil concentrates.

After moving to the Suffern area, Mr. Meyer became connected locally with a number of leading business institutions. He was a chief stockholder in the Lafayette Theatre, the Ramapo Valley Independent newspaper, and the Ramapo Cider & Vinegar Company, and was a vice president of the Suffern National Bank. Henry Meyer and his wife Laura Hard Meyer had two children, Henry von L. Meyer Jr. and Sarah Meyer. The family was well known for their philanthropic interest in the county. For many years they were involved in the State Charities Aid Association, the Rockland Volunteer Aid Society, and the Boy Scouts of America, and were founding members of the Rockland County Conservation Association.

Perhaps their greatest charity work was associated with the Rockland County Society for the Prevention of Cruelty to Animals. Ardent supporters of the society, the Meyers donated thousands of dollars annually and worked actively for the organization, including erecting a branch shelter at their farm to care for homeless animals.

=== Indian Rock ===
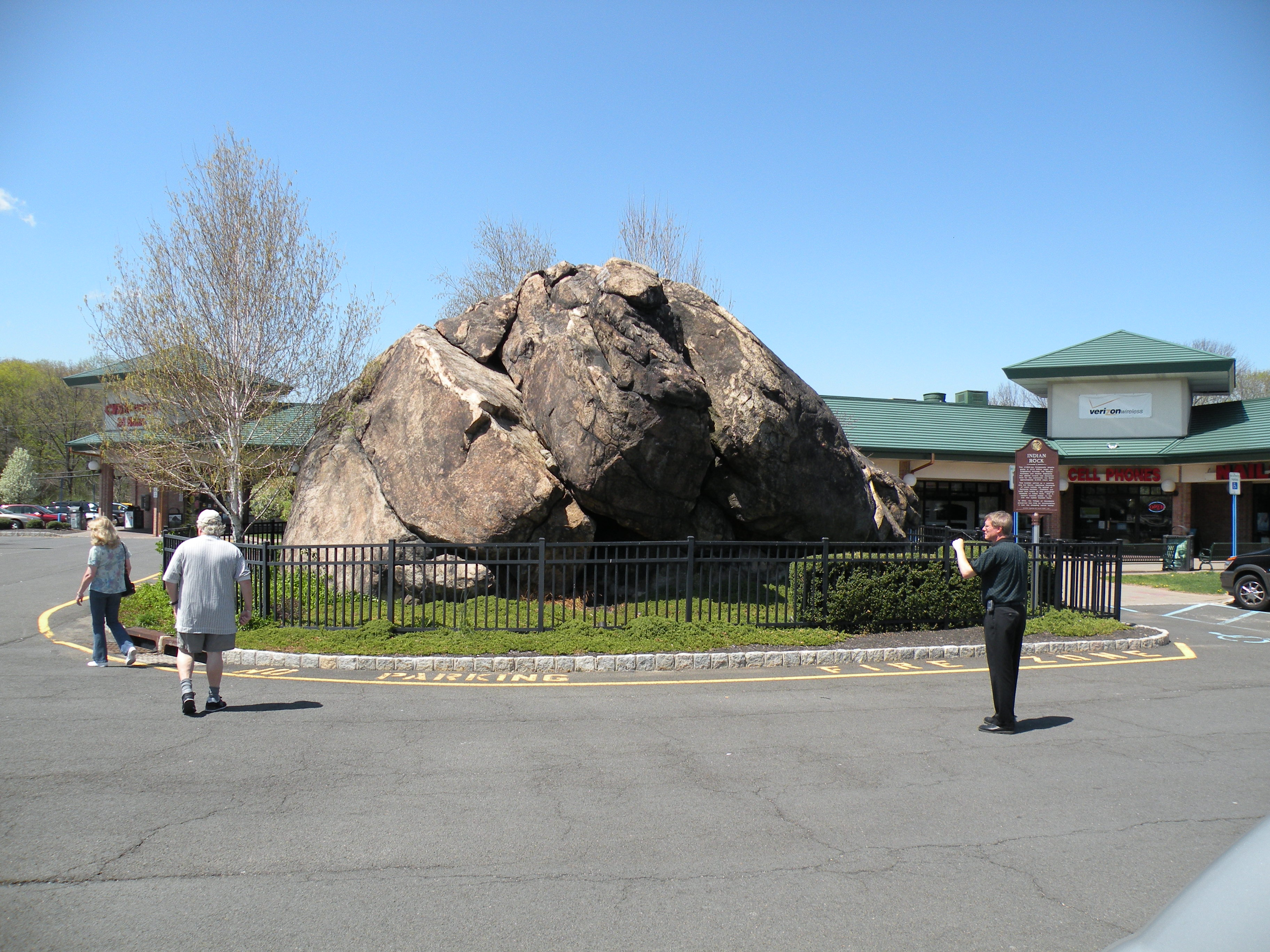
Indian Rock in the Village of Montebello, New York

Indian Rock is a large glacial erratic boulder of granite gneiss, formed in the Proterozoic (Precambrian) era, 1.2 billion to 800 million years ago. It is estimated to weigh ~17,300 tons. The source area for the boulder was nearby in the Ramapo Mountains-Hudson Highlands; it is difficult to know for certain exactly where it was picked up by the glacier, but most likely not more than 5 to 10 kilometers from its current location. The boulder rests upon glacial outwash which in turn lies atop Triassic sedimentary red beds (sandstone and shale) of the Newark Basin (circa 145 million years old). The rock was carried to its current location by the internal flow of the continental ice sheet during the last glacial maximum, circa 21,000 years ago. The base of the continental glacier scoured the bedrock terrain across which it moved, thus plucking large and small blocks of rock from their position in the Ramapo Mountains and Hudson Highlands. Indian Rock got as far as Rockland County before being liberated by the ice and deposited along with gravels shifted by glacial meltwater.

Although Indian Rock may appear to be several rocks piled together, it actually originated as a single boulder (18 feet (5.5 m) by 9 feet (2.7 m) by 15 feet (4.6 m)). Weaknesses within the rock caused by foliation and naturally occurring fractures serve as avenues for moisture infiltration. With repeated freeze-thaw cycles, this moisture expands to exert forces up to 20,000 lbs/inch2 along the planes of weakness, thus wedging the rock apart. Glacial polish, striations and grooves commonly found on erratics of this size have for the most part been effaced by the normal process of decomposition called weathering.

When The Kakiat Indians were abandoning their ancestral hunting grounds in the early eighteenth century, they stopped at Indian Rock and laid their last offerings and partook in a final feast in the land of their birth and traveled westward for a brief period of time where they would be unmolested by the white man.

=== Landmarks and places of interest ===
- Fant Farm, 253-257 Spook Rock Road. The house and barns date to c.1850.
- Montebello Village Hall, 1 Montebello Road, (east end of Montebello Road). The Stanley and Blanche Morse House, now the Montebello Village Hall, was built c. 1920. Attributed to the architect George Fowler, it is an interpretation of the Tudor or English Cottage Style. The building was designated a Montebello Historic Landmark on December 17, 2008.
- Residence, Tudor Revival (c.1923), 1 Lake Road, (west end of Montebello Road)

== Government ==
The duties of the mayor are defined in the NYS Village Law and similar to those of a chief executive. The mayor has the power to provide for the enforcement of all local laws. The mayor presides over the meetings of the board of trustees. The mayor has the power to appoint all village employees and non-elected board and commission members, subject to the approval of the board of trustees. The mayor also executes all contracts in the name of the village.

The board of trustees has the power to manage all village property and finances. This power extends to setting tax rates and fee schedules that generate revenue for the village as well as authorizing expenditures for all municipal purposes. The board of trustees is also empowered to enact local laws for the safety, health, comfort and general welfare of the residents of the village and for the preservation and protection of public works such as roads, street lighting and public buildings.

Montebello is the first village in Rockland County to have a solar photovoltaic system to help power its village hall. It was also the first designated climate-smart community and the first Tree City USA in Rockland County. Montebello has the first certified local government for historic preservation in Rockland County.

The village has its own local justice court.

== Recreational facilities ==
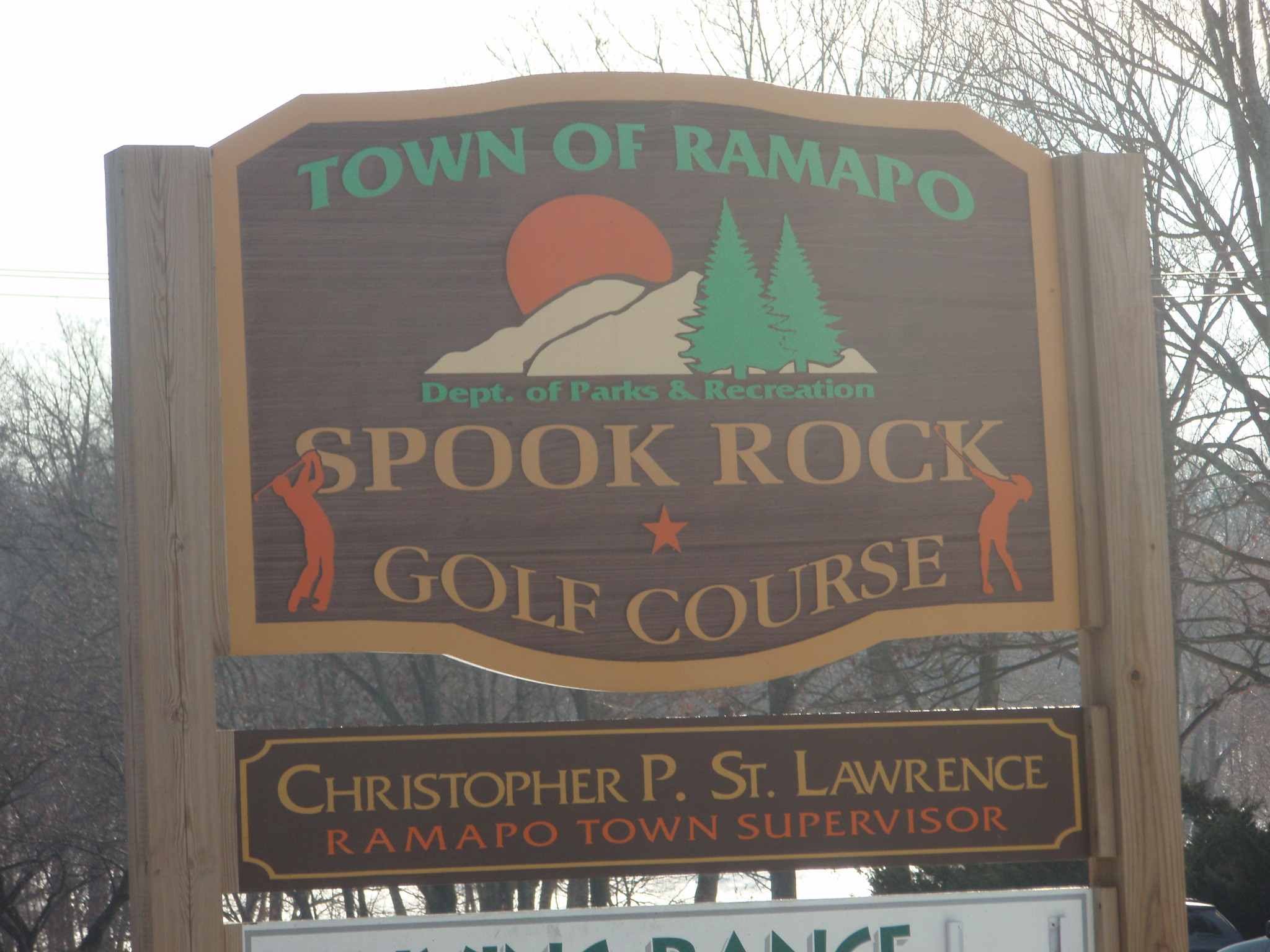
Spook Rock Golf Course in Montebello, NY

- Spook Rock Golf Course: Located on Spook Rock Road, the Spook Rock Golf Course, an 18-hole course, is ranked among the finest public courses in the country. It is situated on property that was originally the site of a Boys Scout camp.
- Spook Rock Pool
- Kathryn Gorman Ponds Park: Located in the Montebello Pines community and named for the first Mayor of the Village, this 25-acre (10 ha) park has many ponds and walking trails. The village received a federal stimulus grant in 2010 to help pay for the development of the park.
- Warren E. Berbit Park: A 12-acre (4.9 ha) natural park on Spook Rock Road which is maintained as open space. Named for the first Village Attorney, this park was originally part of the Fant Farm, but was dedicated to the Village to preserve the magnificent vista of the original farmland.
- Tot lot and 9/11 Memorial: The village has a playground facility on the Village Hall grounds, an outdoor gazebo, and a 9/11 Memorial Garden. In January 2011, the village received a 250-pound (110 kg) steel relic from the World Trade Center to place in the Memorial Garden.
- Kakiat Park: Kakiat Park is a 376-acre (152 ha) park adjacent to Harriman State Park. It is part of the Harris patent, one of the original land patents from the King of England. It is also known as Kakiat Farm, the home of the Blauvelt family who owned and farmed the land for over two hundred years growing apples, peaches and cherries. The park is the site of the Blauvelt mill, the foundation of which still remains. The National Recreation Association in 1961 recommended its purchase to the County Board of Supervisors. As a result, a formally appointed Park Commission was installed and the process of acquiring land for park purposes began. The property officially became county parkland in 1972.

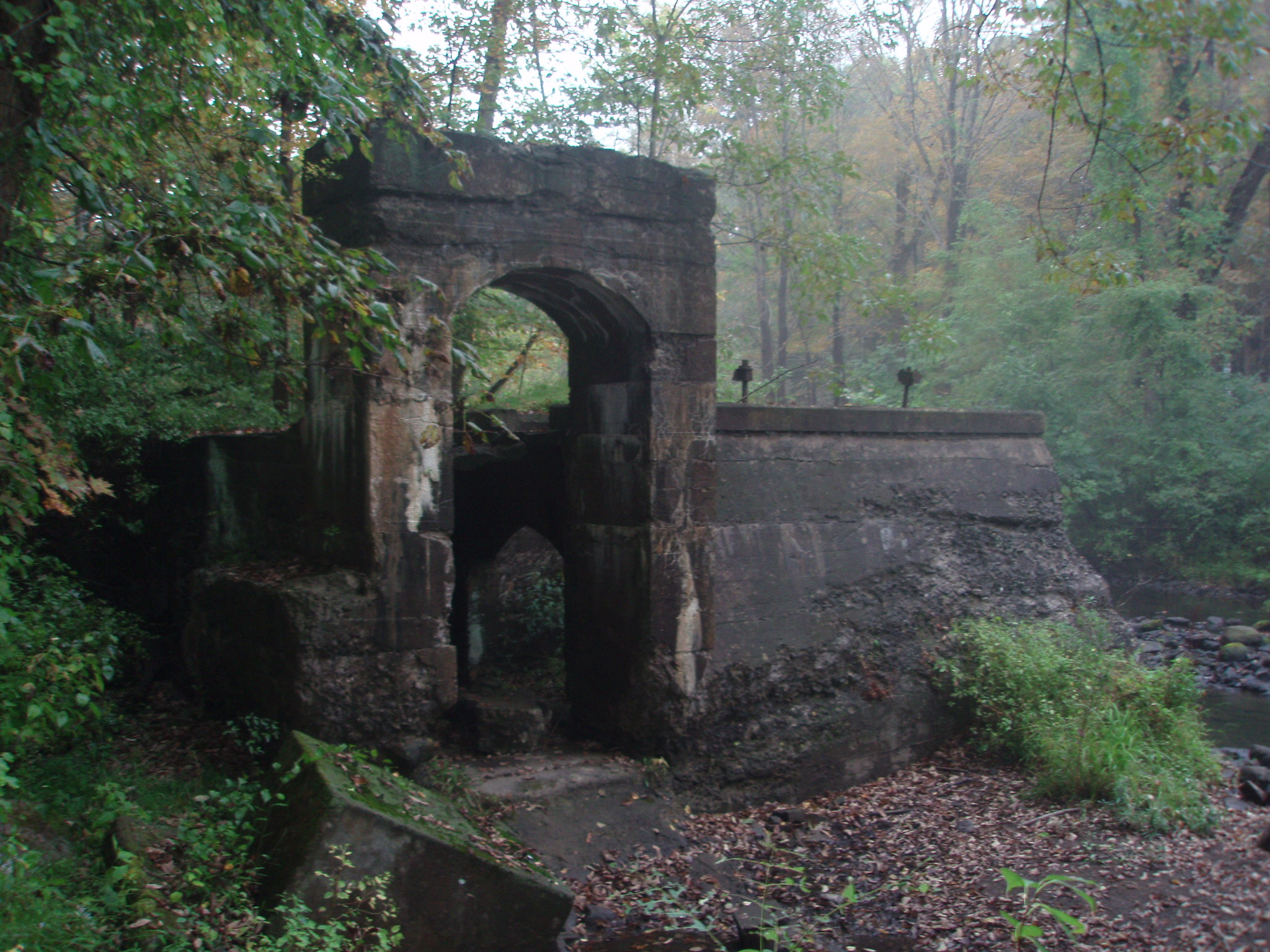
Ruins of a mill at Kakiat Park of Montebello, NY

Activities in the park include hiking (the Kakiat Trail starting from the parking area crosses through the park into Harriman State Park ending up in Dater Mountain County Park), horseback riding, picnicking, and scenic lookouts. An off-leash dog area is located near the parking lot. A log cabin constructed in 1922 stands as a mute reminder of the simple life of 100 years ago. A footbridge crosses the river, which is stocked annually with trout; a pavilion can be found near the river.

Numerous winter activities exist along with active wildlife and forestry conservation projects. Guided tours available by the Park Rangers. There is a diverse topography, from flat wetlands to rolling hills, to steep mountainside. The Mahwah River flows southwesterly the length of the park approximately 2,500 feet (760 m). The Ramapo Fault runs through the park. Trees include willow, apple, poplar, white pine, hemlock, beech, maple, white ash, oaks, and dogwood.

== Sources ==
- Penford, Saxby Voulaer., "Romantic Suffern - The History of Suffern, New York, from the Earliest Times to the Incorporation of the Village in 1896", Tallman, N.Y., 1955, (1st Edition)
