= Stillwater River (Rhode Island) =

River in United States of America

Coordinates: 41.8761°N 71.5646°W

The Stillwater River is a river in the U.S. state of Rhode Island. It flows approximately 6.1 miles (9.8 km). There are four dams along the river's length.

== Course ==
The river is formed by the confluence of Cutler Brook with an unnamed stream, west of the village of Harmony. The river flows in a southeasterly direction to Waterman Lake, then east past the village of Greenville. From there, the river flows in a northerly direction to Stillwater Reservoir where it meets the Woonasquatucket River.

== Crossings ==
Below is a list of all crossings over the Stillwater River. The list starts at the headwaters and goes downstream.

- Glocester
  - Sawmill Road
- Smithfield
  - West Greenville Road
  - Putnam Pike (U.S. 44)
  - Austin Avenue
  - Deerfield Drive
  - Pleasant View Avenue (RI 5/116)

== Tributaries ==
In addition to many unnamed tributaries, the following brooks feed the Stillwater:

- Cutler Brook
- Nine Foot Brook
- Reaper Brook
- Sprague Brook

== See also ==
- List of rivers in Rhode Island
- Woonasquatucket River
- Stillwater Mill
