= Gilbert Heathcote =

Gilbert Heathcote may refer to:

- Sir Gilbert Heathcote, 1st Baronet (1652–1733), British politician, Member of Parliament (MP) for London, St Germans and others
- Sir Gilbert Heathcote, 3rd Baronet (died 1785), British politician, MP for Shaftesbury
- Sir Gilbert Heathcote, 4th Baronet (1773–1851), British politician, MP for Rutland and others
- Gilbert Heathcote (Royal Navy officer) (1779–1831), British naval officer
- Gilbert Heathcote, 1st Baron Aveland (1795–1867), MP for Boston, South Lincolnshire and Rutland
- Gilbert Heathcote (priest) (1775–1829), Archdeacon of Winchester
- Sir Gilbert Simon Heathcote, 9th Baronet (1913–2014), successor of Heathcote baronets of London from 1983 to 2014

== See also ==
- Gilbert Heathcote-Drummond-Willoughby, 1st Earl of Ancaster (1830–1910), British politician, MP for Boston
- Gilbert Heathcote-Drummond-Willoughby, 2nd Earl of Ancaster (1867–1951), British politician, MP for Horncastle
- Sir Gilbert James Heathcote-Drummond-Willoughby, 3rd Earl of Ancaster (1907–1983), British soldier & politician MP for Rutland and Stamford
- Gilbert Heathcote's tunnel, an engineering project dating from the 1630s
