= Heathcott =

Heathcott is a surname. Notable people with the surname include:

- Bob Heathcott, Canadian ice hockey player
- Mike Heathcott (born 1969), American baseball player
- Ralph Heathcott, Anglican clergyman
- Slade Heathcott (born 1990), American baseball player

== See also ==
- Heathcote (disambiguation)
