= Chauncey Stillman =

American philanthropist (1907–1989)

- Born: Chauncey Devereux Stillman; November 9, 1907; New York City, New York, US
- Died: January 24, 1989 (aged 81); New York City, New York, US
- Education: Harvard University; Columbia School of Architecture
- Occupations: Philanthropist; Art Collector; Conservationist
- Employer(s): Central Intelligence Agency; United States Department of Defense; Free America
- Organization(s): Homeland Foundation; Independence Foundation, Inc.
- Known for: Wethersfield Estate & Gardens

Chauncey Devereux Stillman (November 9, 1907 – January 24, 1989) was an American philanthropist, art collector, conservationist, and banking heir. As one biographer noted, "He was one of the richest men of his generation, but he was never idle or indolent."

He founded the Homeland Foundation, which later became the Wethersfield Foundation in support of Wethersfield Estate & Gardens in Dutchess County, New York, which is listed on the National Register of Historic Places.

== Early life ==
Stillman was born in New York City to an affluent Episcopalian family. His parents were Mary Estelle Wight (1870–1925) and Charles Chauncey Stillman (1877–1926), who was a financier and one of Harvard University's "greatest benefactors." Two of his father's sisters married sons of William Rockefeller Jr. His paternal grandfather was James Jewett Stillman, a railroad magnate, president of the First National City Bank in New York City (now Citibank), and one of the wealthiest men in the United States. James Stillman was also a philanthropist and yachtsman. As one writer put it, "In their heyday, the Stillmans were New York royalty—not quite Carnegies, but fabulously rich."

In February 1907, the family moved to a mansion at 9 East 67th Street in Manhattan, New York. This home was filled with art, including at least twelve old masters such as Rembrandt's Portrait of Titus. They also owned Kenridge, a large country estate at Cornwall-on-Hudson, New York.

Stillman attended Harvard University, graduating in 1929. There, he was a member of Delphic Club. He was also the senior class odist, penning his class ode and reading it at the graduation ceremony. While he was at college, his mother, father, and brother all died of different causes. As a result, he was the heir to a vast fortune. Stillman was adrift for the rest of his twenties, "seeking a place and a purpose to call his own." He graduated with a master's degree from the Columbia University School of Architecture. While at Columbia, he joined the Fraternity of Delta Psi (St. Anthony Hall).

In 1930 when his sister got married, Stillman moved out of his childhood home on 67th Street and into a new seven-room penthouse on 33 East 70th Street.

== Career ==
Stillman served as a director of Freeport Minerals Company (later Freeport–McMoRan), beginning in December 1931.

In 1937, he founded, underwrote, and was president of Free America, Inc. and edited the monthly magazine Free America with Ralph Borsodi and Herbert Agar. Through 1947, the magazine promoted agrarianism, distributism, the idea of spreading land-ownership to the entire population, and decentralization, expressing his belief "that independence could only be found in a society with decentralized business and political power." Douglas Dewey notes, “By no means was he enamored with socialism or communism. He believed in the free market but he also believed strongly in patronage.”

During World War II, Stillman served as an air combat intelligence officer with Air Group 20 on the USS Enterprise CV-6 and USS Lexington CV-16, and fought in the Battle of Leyte Gulf in October 1944. He later served as a staff officer with the United States National Security Council.

As a civilian in 1947, he worked for the newly created United States Department of Defense under its first secretary, James Forrestal. A short time later, he worked for the Central Intelligence Agency through 1951.

== Philanthropy ==
Stillman dedicated his life to philanthropy, and was an advocate of homesteading and agricultural experimentation. Around 1936, he joined Ralph Borsodi in becoming a founding board member of the Independence Foundation, Inc., which secured land for homesteading communities.

In June 1938, he established and was president of the Homeland Foundation (now called the Wethersfield Foundation). Its purpose was to “make, institute, conduct and carry out every manner and kind of scientific, agricultural, horticultural, or biological experiment, research, study and investigation, and in any other way to assist in improving and developing country life and to experiment, research, study and investigate with regard to the most satisfactory means of economic and social life in rural communities.” Later, the foundation's mission would expand to encompass his diverse interests, “to display art and period furniture; to sponsor religious charitable, scientific, and literary programs; to use for cultural activities; public outdoor recreation and scenic enjoyment; protection of natural environmental systems; conservation, cultural, intellectual, religious, and recreations purposes; preservation of natural wildlife; and to make other contributions and gifts, but only if made for exclusively public purposes.” He was president of the foundation's board of trustees until his death. Under his leadership, grants were made that related to architectural preservation, art restoration, his religious faith, and religious art.

In 1959, Stillman donated a new Our Lady's Chapel at the Immaculate Conception Church in Brownsville, Texas, a community founded by his great-grandfather. Around 1962, he endowed the Stillman Chair for Catholic Studies at Harvard University. In 1969, he acquired the circa 1793 Captain James Francis House in Wethersfield, Connecticut, and donated it to the Wethersfield Historical Society.

He was a director of the National Audubon Society, a director of the New York Botanical Garden from 1946 to 1969, and a trustee of the New York Zoological Society for almost thirty years. He was also an annual donor to the Animal Kingdom Foundation.

== Publications ==
- Important Paintings by Old and Modern Masters: From the Estate of the Late James Stillman Sold by Order of the Heirs and from the Collection of the Late C.C. Stillman, with James Stillman. New York: American Art Association, 1927.
- "Book Review: The Long Night." The North American Review. vol. 242, number 2 (1936): 438–441.
- Air Group 20: An Unofficial Portrayal of Carrier Air Group Twenty, 1949.
- Charles Stillman, 1810-1875. New York: Chauncey Devereux Stillman, 1956.
- The Annigoni Frescoes At Wethersfield House. Amenia, New York: Chauncey Devereux Stillman, 1973.
- "Christopher Dawson Recollections from America." The Chesterton Review, vol. 9, number 2 (1983): 143–148.

== Honors ==
- Stillman was listed in Who's Who in America.
- The Stillman Chair for Catholic Studies at Harvard University is named in his honor.
- He was honored as a Gentiluomo de Sua Santita by the Holy See.
- Stillman Dormitory at Thomas More College of Liberal Arts is named in his honor.
- In 1931, the gates of Dunster House at Harvard University were given by Stillman in memory of his father, Charles Chauncey Stillman
- The Chauncey Stillman Professor of Sephardic Law and Ethics of Bar Ilan University in Tel Aviv, Israel, was created in his honor by the Homeland Foundation in 2005.
- Goodspeed Musicals' Chauncey Stillman Production Facility in East Haddam, Connecticut, was named in his honor.

== Personal life ==
Stillman married Theodora Moran Jay of New York City on January 21, 1939, in a chapel in her grandmother's house. She was the daughter of Elizabeth Morgan and DeLancey Kane Jay of Long Island, New York, and a descendant of John Jay, the first Chief Justice of the United States. They had three daughters: Emily Theodora Jay Stillman (born and died 1939), Elizabeth Jay Stillman (born 1944), and Mary Theodora Stillman (born 1945). In 1949, Theodora went to Reno, Nevada, and secured a divorce from Stillman on the basis of "extreme cruelty" on July 29, 1949. She retained custody of their two daughters and received an "extremely large property settlement" in a sealed agreement. On December 29, 1954, Theodora returned to Reno and received a modified alimony of $5,600 per month. The supplemental agreement also gave her $950 a month for child support.

He collected Renaissance art, especially religious art such as works by Lorenzo di Credi and Francesco Francia. However, his collection also included works by James E. Buttersworth, Mary Cassatt, Edgar Degas, Nicolas Lancret, Bartolomé Esteban Murillo, John Singer Sargent, Gilbert Stuart, and Henri de Toulouse-Lautrec. His "prize" was Portrait of a Halberdier which was painted by Jacopo Pontormo in the 1530s.

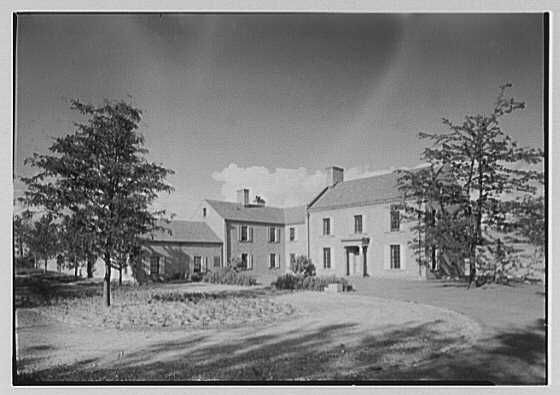
Wethersfield, 1944

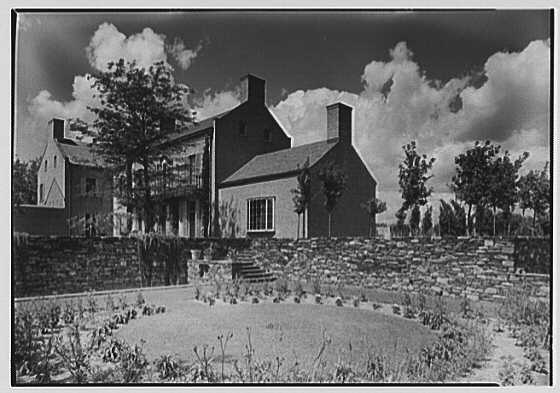
Wethersfield, east façade over the nearly landscaped garden, 1944

Stillman was also an avid equestrian and saw the beauty of rural Dutchess County, New York, while riding the Millbrook Hunt. In 1937, he purchased two depleted farms in the area, with a combined total of around 400 acres (160 ha). There, he built Wethersfield, a country estate near Amenia, New York. He named his estate after his family's first home in America in 1705—Wethersfield, Connecticut. He gradually expanded the estate to 1,200 acres (490 ha). Some of his first additions to the property were a stables and large carriage house for his collection of 22 19th-century carriages that were drawn by a team of Hackney horses that he imported from England.

In 1939, he hired the architect L. Bancel LaFarge to create a brick and brownstone Georgian-style house at Wethersfield that included a private chapel, a library decorated with wood carvings from a Scottish castle, and a room with a vaulted ceiling with frescoes by Pietro Annigoni to display Portrait of a Halberdier. In addition to its art collection, Wethersfield was also known for its 10 acres (4.0 ha) of formal gardens that were inspired by 17th-century Italy. Designed by Evelyn N. Poehler, the gardens include "a painterly sequence of Italian Renaissance–inspired spaces was conjured, linked by sweeping terraces, speckled with thrilling statues in a modern-classical style, and punctuated by an ornamental oval pool with water dyed jet-black to mirror the passage of the sun." The Italian Gardens combine perennials and evergreens with stonework, a swimming pool (now a reflecting pond), the brick Grasshopper House folly, and the Belvedere, a circular temple with six columns. In addition, Poehler designed a 7-acre (2.8 ha) Wilderness Garden with trails and carriage drives through a deciduous woodland with ferns, mountain laurels, and rhododendrons as an "allegorical journey" based on Dante's Divine Comedy—like the bosci of the Italian Renaissance. The Woodland Garden also features statues by Peter Watts and Jozef Stachura that represent figures from Greek and Roman mythology. Poehler worked with Stillman for more than 25 years to develop and maintain the estate's gardens.

Stillman also raised vegetables and livestock, using the estate for agricultural experimentation. He became a pioneer in soil and water conservation, banning herbicides, rotating crops, and practicing biodynamic agriculture. He added twelve irrigation ponds and reforested his land. He also prohibited automobiles on the property, instead adding twenty miles of carriage trails.

Stillman maintained a residence in New York City, and divided his time between both homes. He read Greek and did needlepoint. He also enjoyed yachting. Westerly, his 72-ft, Sparkman & Stephens-designed ketch-rigged sailing yacht was seconded to the Coast Guard for use as a patrol boat during World War II. He was a member of the New York Yacht Club, becoming its commodore in the 1960s. and 'Westerly' was the NYYC flagship when the club defended the America's Cup in 1962. He was also a member of the Carriage Association of America (CAA); Caroline Kennedy rode with Stillman in his carriage at a CAA event in Newport, Rhode Island in March 1968.

When he was 45 years old, Stillman converted to Catholicism. He said, “In 1952, I joined the Catholic Church after three decades of deliberation." In the 1980s, he established the Wethersfield Institute in Manhattan, to sponsor religious seminars.

In 1989, Stillman died of lung cancer in his apartment in New York City at the age of 82 years. He left Wethersfield and much of his personal art collection to the Homeland Foundation. Wethersfield opened to the public shortly after his death and is now managed by the nonprofit Wethersfield Foundation, Inc. It is listed on the National Register of Historic Places.

To help expand the foundation's reach, Portrait of a Halberdier was sold at auction in 1989 to the Getty Museum for $34 million, then the highest price ever paid for an old master. In 1998, the foundation's assets totaled $103 million. However, over the next seventeen years, the foundation's trustees overspent and misappropriated funds, resulting in a balance of just $31 million. Stillman's heirs stepped in and the foundation sold more paintings to be able to preserve Wethersfield.
