= Stillwater, Nova Scotia =

Stillwater, Nova Scotia may refer to:

- Stillwater, Guysborough, Nova Scotia in Guysborough County
- Stillwater, Hants, Nova Scotia in Hants County
- Stillwater Lake, Nova Scotia in the Halifax Regional Municipality
