= Woonasquatucket River =

River in Rhode Island, United States

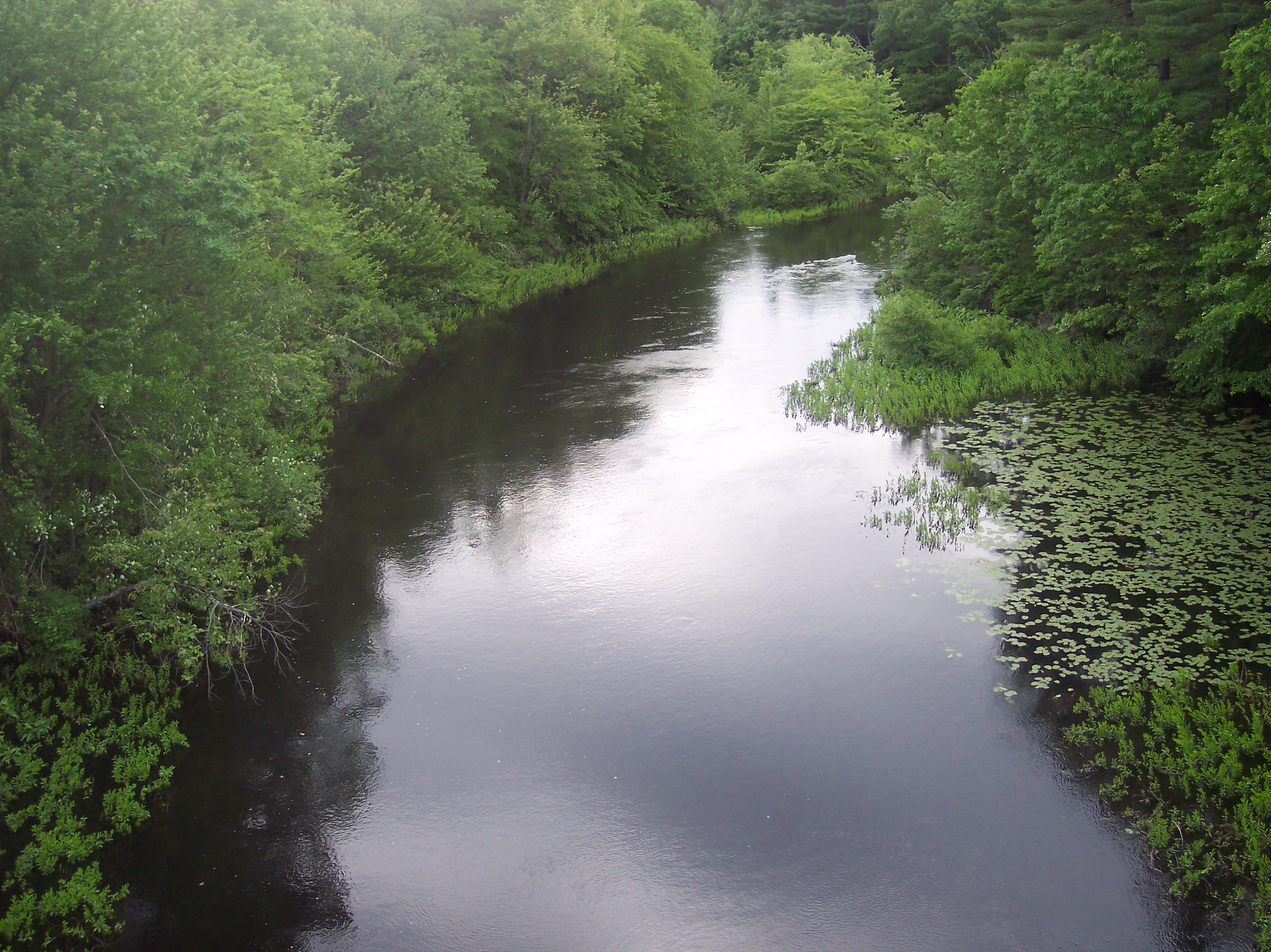
- The Woonasquatucket River below Stillwater Reservoir in Smithfield

Location
- Country: United States
- State: Rhode Island
- County: Providence

Physical characteristics
- Source
  - location: North Smithfield, Rhode Island
- Mouth
  - location: Providence River
  - coordinates: 41.8267°N 71.4100°W
- Length: 15.8 mi (25.4 km)
- Basin size: 130 km^{2} (50 sq mi)

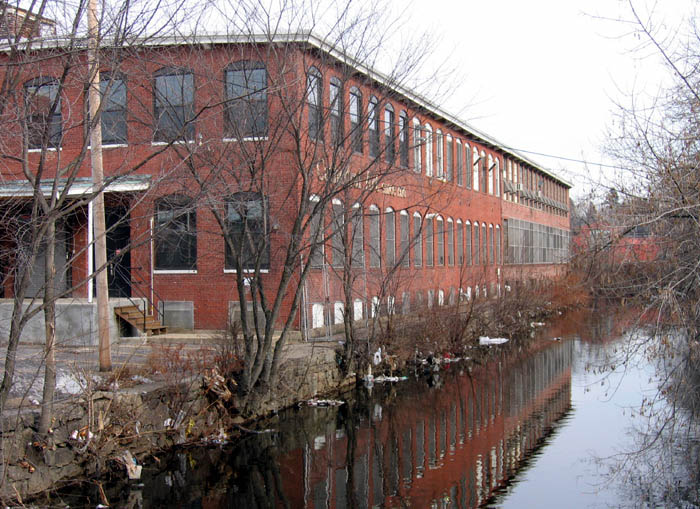
The Woonasquatucket River in the Olneyville neighborhood of Providence

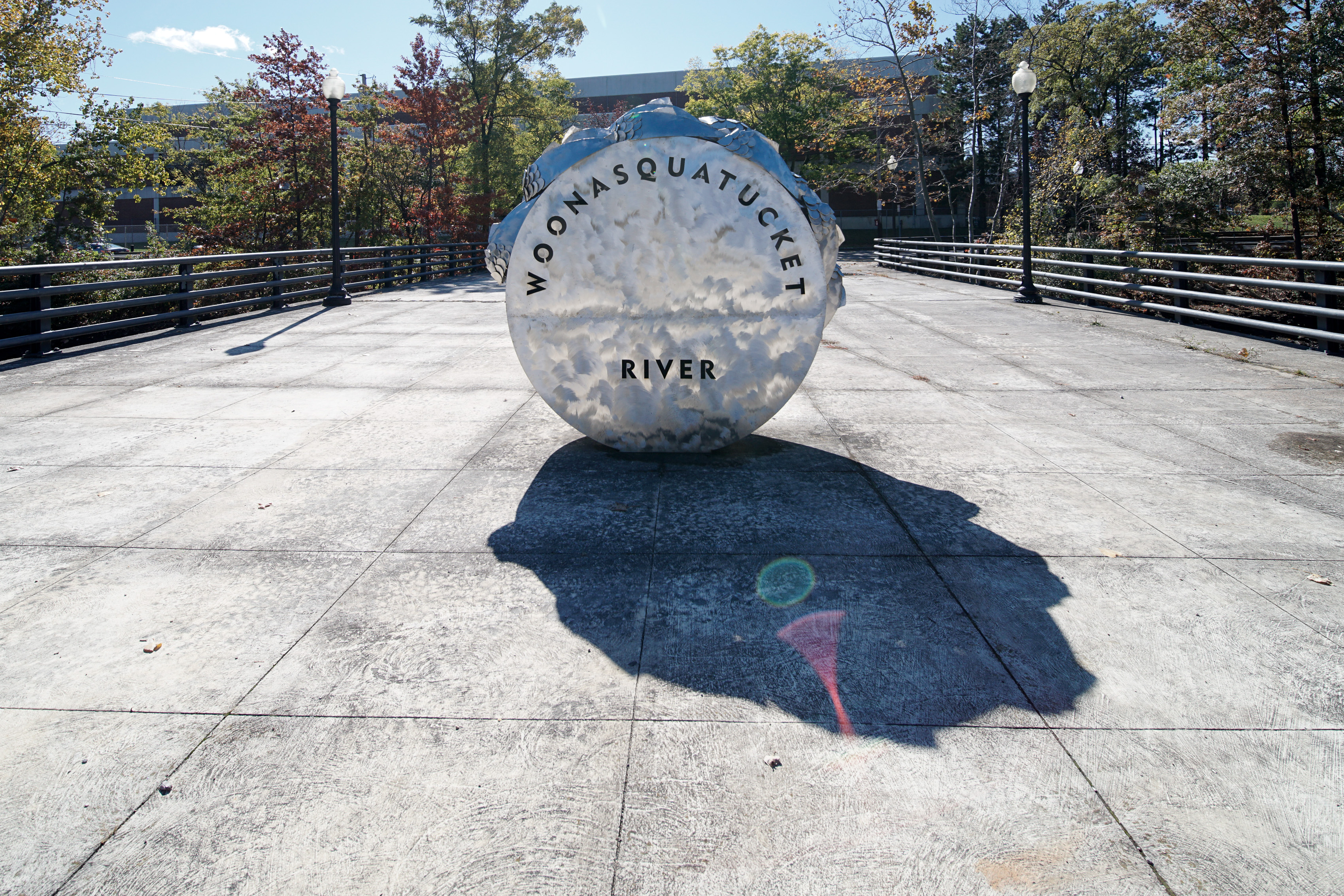
Sculpture in Providence

The Woonasquatucket River (pronounced /wuːˈnɑːskwəˌtʌkɪt/ woo-NAH-skwə-TUK-it, Algonquian for "where the salt water ends"), sometimes called "the Woonie", is a river in the U.S. state of Rhode Island. It flows approximately 15.8 miles (25.4 km) and drains a watershed of 130 km^{2} (50 sq mi).

Together with the Blackstone River to the north, the Woonasquatucket was designated an American Heritage River in 1998. Both rivers played active roles in the Industrial Revolution and the history of Rhode Island in the 19th century. Evidence of this industrial history remains in the fact that there are 18 dams along the river's length.

== Course ==
The river begins in the swamps west of Primrose Pond in North Smithfield and runs southeast past Primrose Pond to Stillwater Reservoir. Below the reservoir, the river continues southeast, providing water to numerous ponds, until going under Providence Place mall and joining the Moshassuck River in front of the One Citizens Plaza building in downtown Providence to form the Providence River. The lower part of the river, below Rising Sun Dam in Olneyville is tidal.

250 years ago, the river flowed into what was called "The Great Salt Cove," just a little below where Rising Sun Dam now stands. The Great Salt Cove was about 1 1/2 miles long and up to half a mile wide, covering several hundred acres. Much of the present, flat land in this area was once either the cove itself or salt marshes along the edges of the cove. The flat land is fill added over the years to make more land to build on, beginning as early as 1780. The western end of the Great Salt Cove was near where Atwells Avenue now crosses Route 6.

From near the Atwells Avenue bridge over the Woonasquatucket to Interstate 95 and on to its present mouth, the Woonasquatucket's course is a man-made channel that flows underneath Providence Place Mall and through Waterplace Park. In and below Waterplace Park, the Woonasquatucket River is also used as part of WaterFire, which continues down the upper part of the Providence River.

== Crossings ==
Below is a list of all 29 crossings over the Woonasquatucket River. The list starts at the headwaters and goes downstream.

- North Smithfield
  - Greenville Road (RI 5/104)
  - Douglas Pike (RI 7)
- Smithfield
  - Farnum Pike (RI 5/104)
  - Old Forge Road
  - Farnum Pike (RI 5/104)
  - George Washington Highway (RI 116)
  - Capron Road
  - Whipple Avenue
  - Farnum Pike (RI 104)
  - Esmond Street
  - Esmond Mill Drive
- North Providence
  - Angell Avenue
  - Putnam Pike (U.S. 44)
  - Allendale Avenue
- Johnston
  - Greenville Avenue (Greenville Avenue becomes Manton Avenue as it crosses the river)
- Providence
  - Glenbridge Avenue
  - U.S. 6 (Twice)
  - Manton Avenue
  - Delaine Street
  - Valley Street
  - Atwells Avenue
  - Eagle Street
  - Acorn Street
  - Dean Street
  - Bath Street
  - Interstate 95
  - Francis Street
  - Exchange Street
  - Steeple Street (U.S. 44 Eastbound)

== History ==
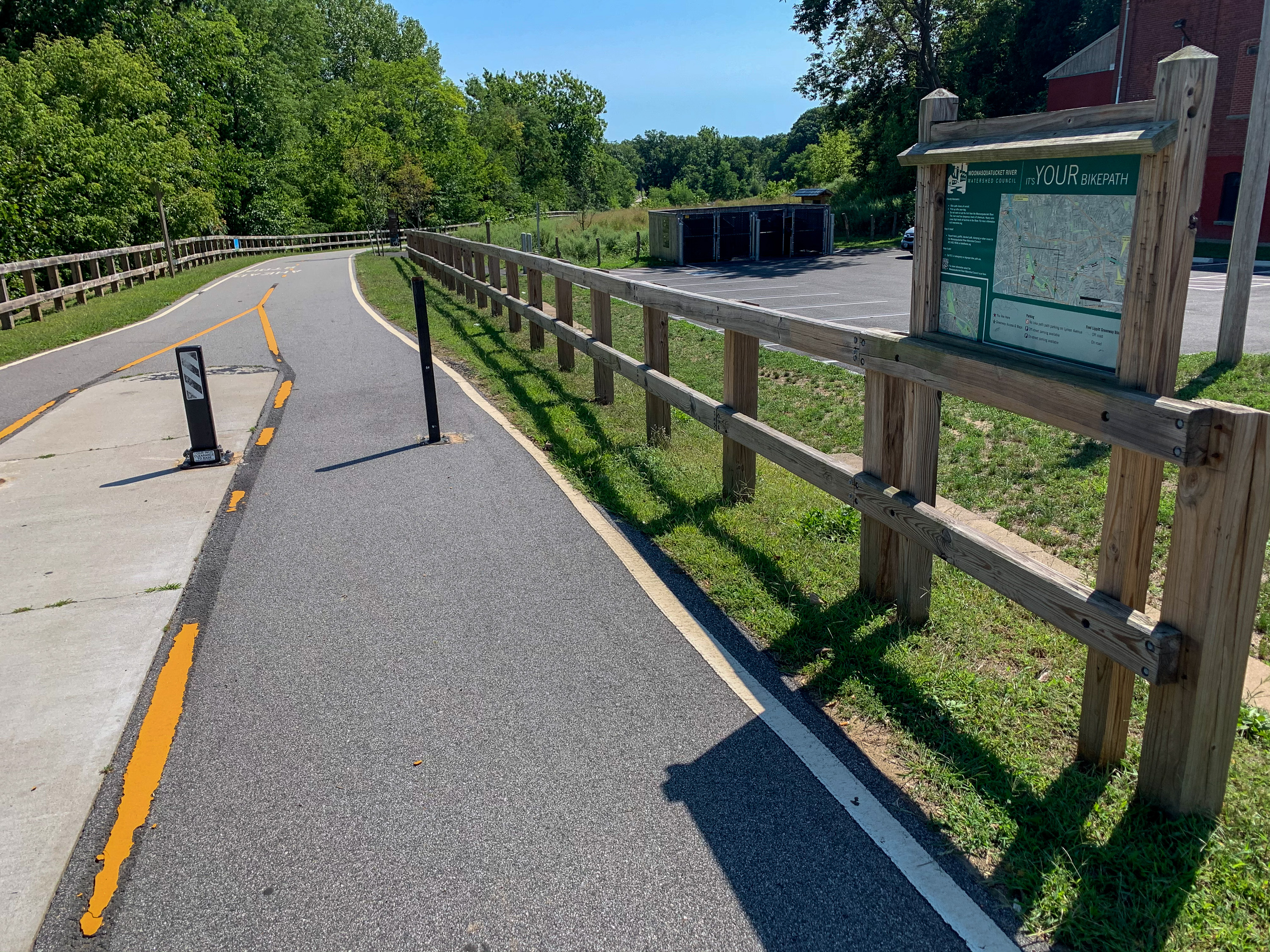
Woonasquatucket River Greenway

The river was an important transportation route for native peoples, especially for connecting various tribes of the Algonquian nation to what is now the Providence River and the Atlantic Ocean beyond. The area now known as Federal Hill in Providence was an important meeting place along the river for bands of the Narragansett and Wampanoag tribes. Known as Nocabulabet (pronounced "nok-a-BUL-a-bet"; thought to be an early settlers version of an Algonquian phrase meaning "hill above the river" or "place between the ancient waters"), this was a place where tribes gathered for trading and harvest festivals. Some believe it was also used as a vantage point to watch for marauding tribes approaching from Narragansett Bay.

== Tributaries ==
In addition to many unnamed tributaries, the following brooks and rivers feed the Woonasquatucket:

- Latham Brook
- Stillwater River
- Harris Brook
- Hawkins Brook
- Assapumpset Brook
- Reaper Brook
- Mattetee Swamp Brook
- Hanton Brook
- Gould Brook
- Whipple Brook
- Pleasant Valley Stream

== See also ==
- List of rivers in Rhode Island
- Moshassuck River
- Providence River
- Stillwater River
