= Heathcote School =

Heathcote School may refer to:

in Australia

- Heathcote High School, New South Wales

in England

- Heathcote School, Essex
- The Heathcote School, Hertfordshire
- Heathcote School, Chingford, Greater London
