= Heathcote Community =

Community in Maryland, U.S.

Coordinates: 39°42′32″N 76°40′6″W

Heathcote Community is a small intentional community located in rural Maryland, US, about 30 miles (48 km) north of Baltimore. The community was independently formed by School of Living members after an initiative by Mildred Loomis. She briefly joined and led the community afterward, during which time Heathcote was the School of Living Headquarters. Heathcote eventually became an independent entity on land leased to them by School of Living.

Heathcote is situated on a 44-acre (18 ha) community land trust next to a 68-acre (280,000 m^{2}) plot owned by some of its members, had a total of about 20 adult and child members, plus seasonal volunteers, at its peak. It now consists of 1 resident full-member, 3 other adults, and 2 children.

Heathcote's past activities focused on the old historic mill, scheduled for renovation in 2023-24. During 2023, activities are mostly outdoor, including the community organic garden.

Some community activities are sponsored by the Heathcote Education Center, which is a fiscally sponsored project of School of Living. Heathcote is affiliated with the School of Living Community Land Trust but an independent organization.
