= Joe Heathcote =

English footballer

Joseph Heathcote (January 1878 – unknown) was an English footballer who played as a forward. Born in Ardwick, Manchester, he played for Berry's Association and Newton Heath.
