= Still waters run deep =

Proverb of Latin origin

"Still waters run deep" is a proverb of Latin origin now commonly taken to mean that a placid exterior hides a passionate or subtle nature. Formerly it also carried the warning that silent people are dangerous, as in Suffolk's comment on a fellow lord in William Shakespeare's play Henry VI part 2:

Smooth runs the water where the brook is deep,
And in his simple show he harbours treason...
No, no, my sovereign, Gloucester is a man
Unsounded yet and full of deep deceit.

According to The Concise Oxford Dictionary of Proverbs, the first mention of the proverb appeared in Classical times in the form altissima quaeque flumina minimo sono labi (the deepest rivers flow with least sound) in a history of Alexander the Great by Quintus Rufus Curtius and is there claimed as being of Bactrian origin. The earliest use in English sources goes back to 1400.

== In fable ==
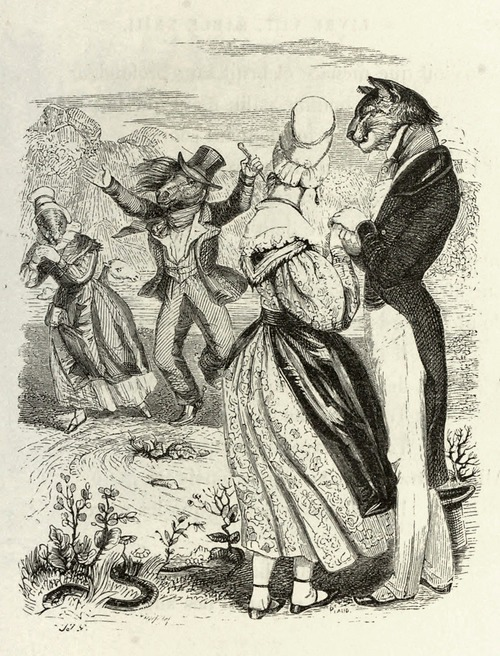
J. J. Grandville's interpretation of La Fontaine's fable from the 1855 edition

In about 1490, the Italian writer Laurentius Abstemius expanded the proverb into a short fable in Latin titled De rustico amnem transituro in his Hecatomythium. This was subsequently included in European collections of Aesop's fables. In 1692, Roger L'Estrange included an outline of Abstemius' version in his edition of the fables, under the title of A Country-man and a River. L'estrange concludes with the assertion that those of few words are dangerous:

A Country-man that was to pass a River, sounded it up and down to try where it was most fordable: and upon Trial he made this Observation on't: Where the Water ran Smooth, he found it Deepest; and on the contrary, Shallowest where it made most Noise. There's More Danger in a Reserv'd and Silent, than in a Noisy, Babbling Enemy.

Slightly earlier than L'Estrange's translation, there was an amplified version of the story in La Fontaine's Fables under the title "The torrent and the river" (Le torrent et la rivière, VIII.23). It tells of a man trying to escape a robber who easily fords a turbulent stream but drowns in a smooth-flowing river, ending on the caution that 'Silent folk are dangerous'. The French proverb that is the nearest equivalent to the English 'still waters run deep' also emphasizes this danger: 'no water is worse than quiet water' (Il n'est pire eau que l'eau qui dort). When the caricaturist J. J. Grandville illustrated La Fontaine's fable, he further underlined this meaning by transposing it into a seduction scene with anthropomorphized animals. In the background a capering donkey and a shrew are advancing along the road, watched by a woman whose hands are clasped by a sleek cat. Unnoticed at her feet, a snake is slithering through the grass.
