= Neighborhoods in Providence, Rhode Island =

Map of Providence neighborhoods

The city of Providence, Rhode Island has 25 official neighborhoods.

- Blackstone
- Charles
- College Hill
- Downtown
- Elmhurst
- Elmwood
- Federal Hill
- Fox Point
- Hartford
- Hope (Summit)
- Lower South Providence
- Manton
- Mount Hope
- Mount Pleasant
- Olneyville
- Reservoir
- Silver Lake
- Smith Hill
- South Elmwood
- Upper South Providence
- Valley
- Wanskuck
- Washington Park
- Wayland
- West End

== Regions ==
Many of these neighborhoods are often grouped together referred to collectively:

- East Side – Blackstone, Hope, Mount Hope, College Hill, Wayland, and Fox Point.
- North End – Charles, Wanskuck, Smith Hill, Elmhurst, and Mount Pleasant.
- South Side or South Providence – Elmwood, Lower South Providence, Upper South Providence, West End, and Washington Park.

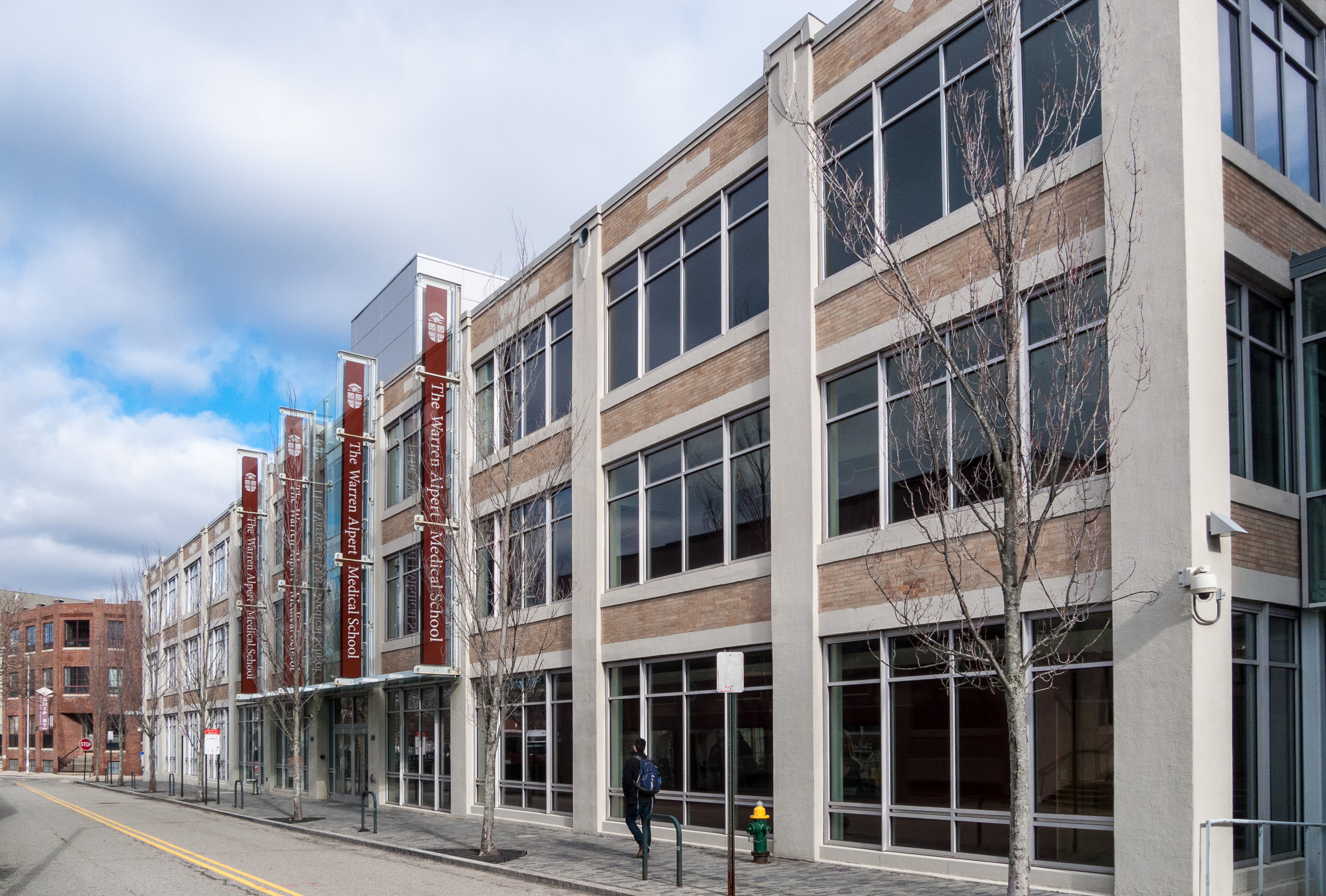
The Alpert Medical School is based in a former Jewelry factory in the Jewelry District

The Jewelry District occupies the southern portion of Downtown Providence. Since the area was re-united with Downtown following the relocation of Interstate 195, the city has been working to attract high-tech and research companies to this area under the rebranded name of "Knowledge District." This area is not recognized as one of Providence's 25 official neighborhoods. The Hospital District, a non-residential area within Upper South Providence is similarly unrecognized.

The oldest, highest density neighborhoods are either those close to Downtown or proximate to the Woonasquatucket River, which provided a power source for early industrialization in Manton, Hartford, and Olneyville. More distant neighborhoods developed later, mostly as transportation as public horse car and streetcar lines were added.

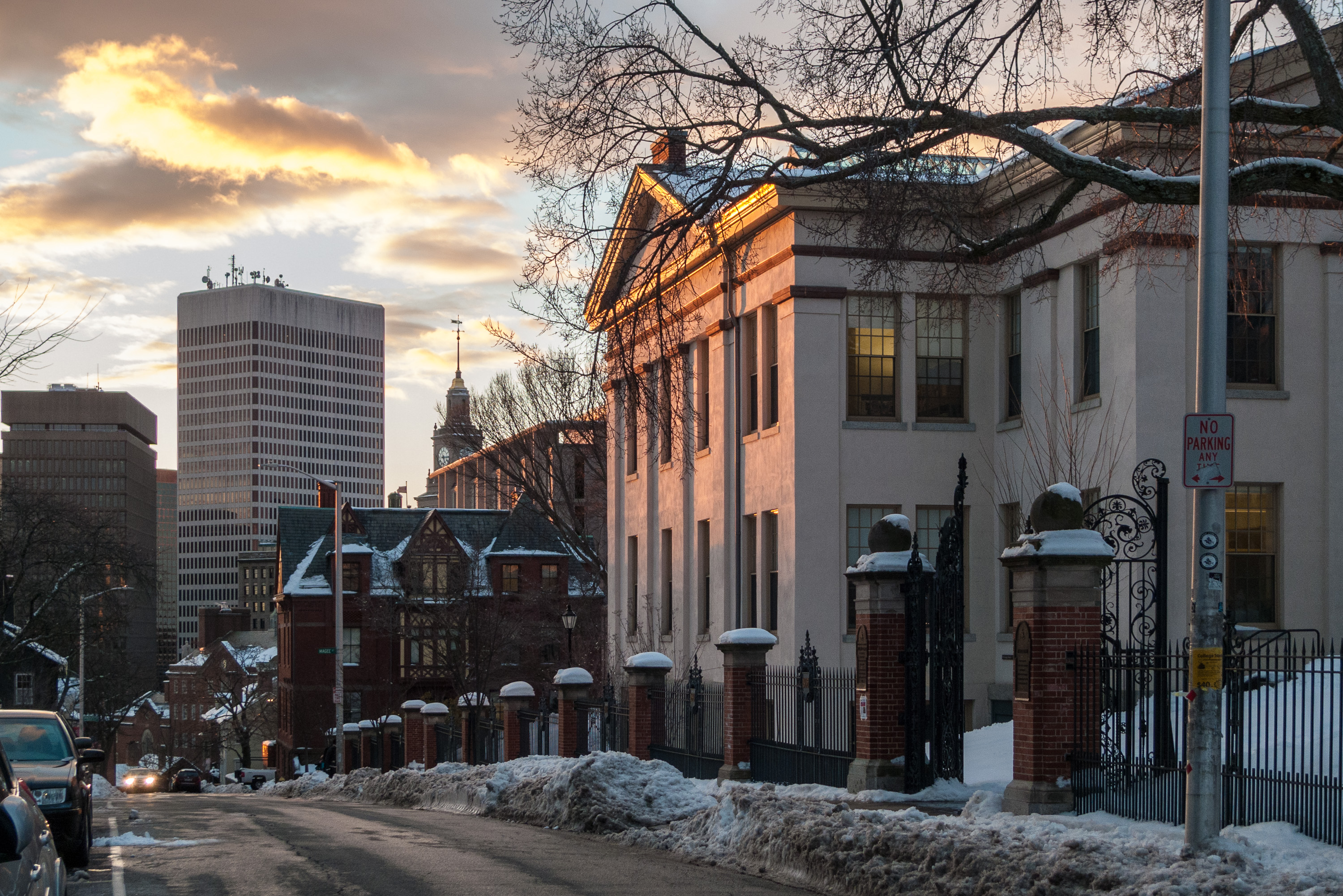
College Hill, on Providence's East Side overlooks Downtown

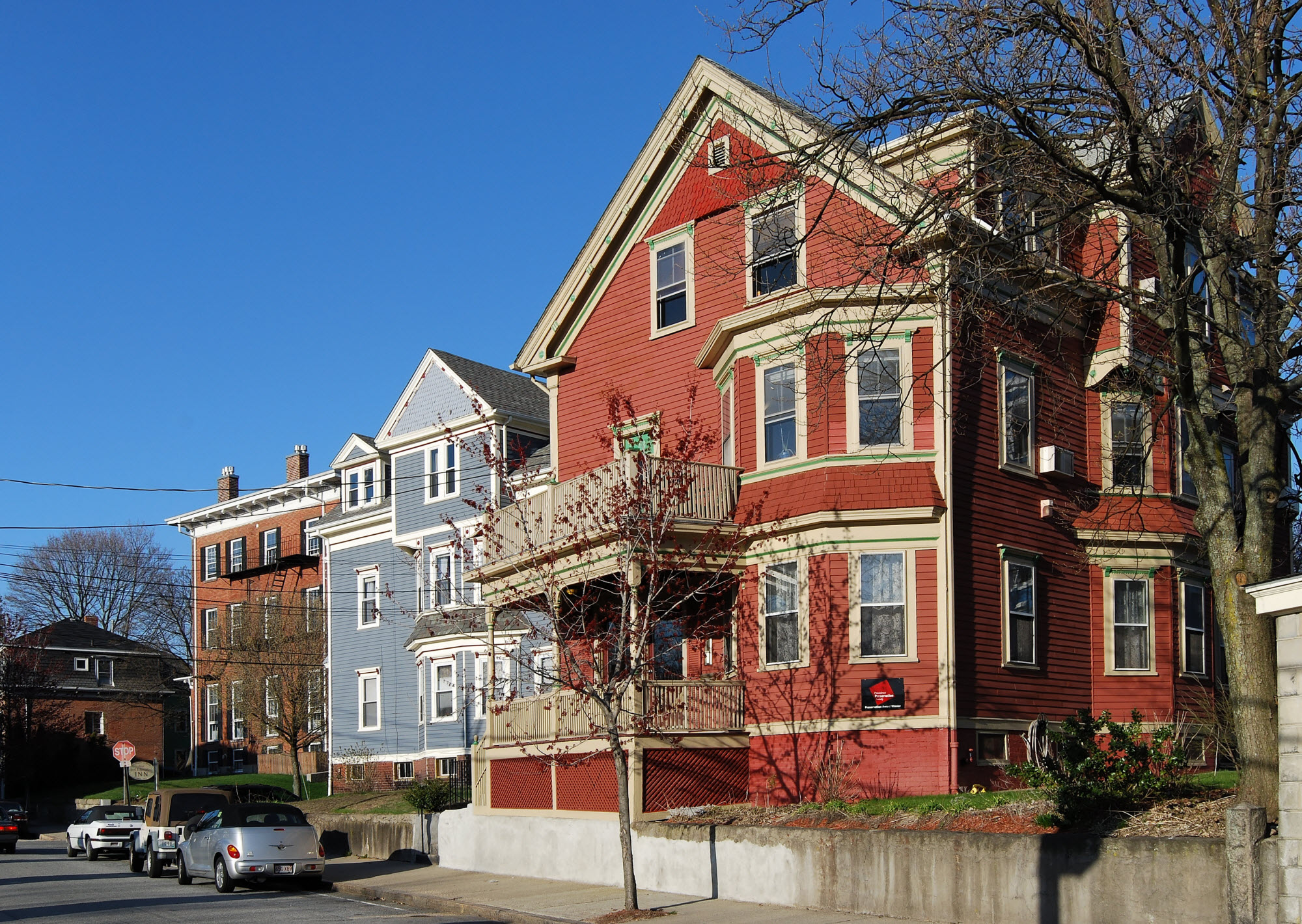
Smith Hill forms one of the neighborhoods on Providence's North End

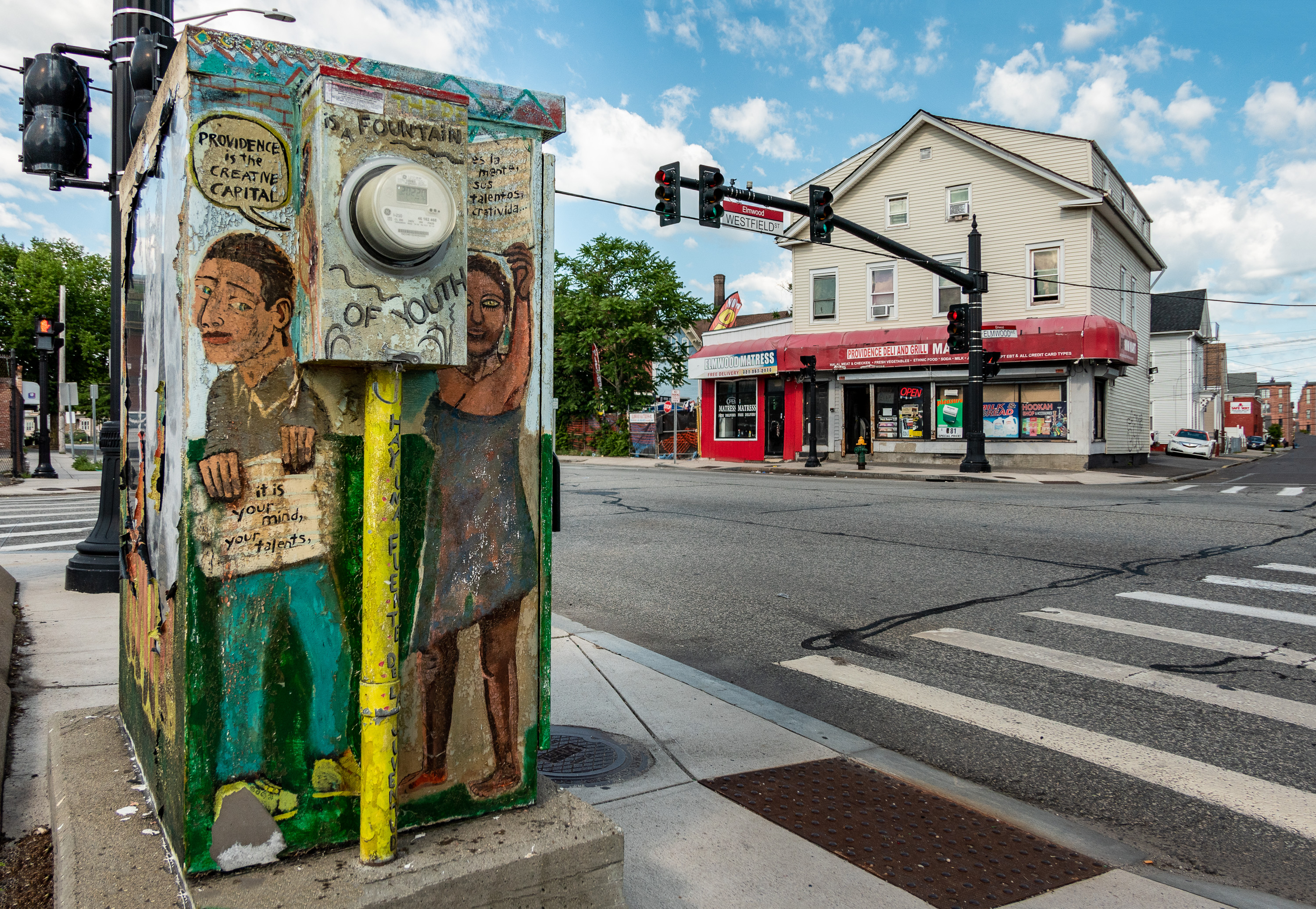
Elmwood is part of Providence's South Side
