= Providence Fire Department =

Coordinates: 41°49′25″N 71°25′20″W

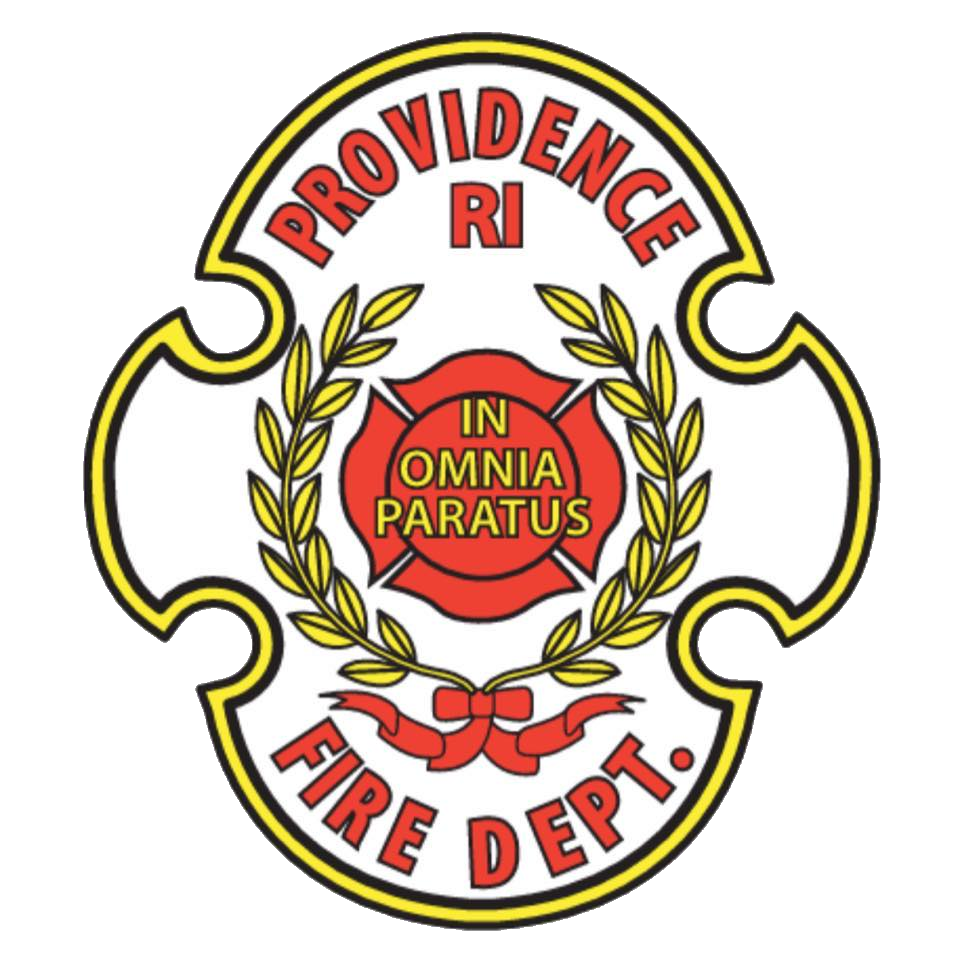

Operational area
- Country: United States
- State: Rhode Island
- City: Providence

Agency overview
- Established: March 1, 1854
- Annual calls: 45,750 (2024)
- Annual budget: $67,775,182 (2014)
- Staffing: Career
- Fire chief: Derek Silva
- IAFF: 799
- Motto: “In Omnia Paratus,” meaning “In All Things Ready”

Facilities and equipment
- Divisions: 1
- Battalions: 3
- Stations: 12
- Engines: 12
- Trucks: 7
- Platforms: 2
- Squads: 1(Special Hazards)
- Rescues: 7 (ambulances)
- Tenders: 1
- HAZMAT: 1
- Fireboats: 1
- Rescue boats: 1
- Light and air: 1

Website
- Official website
- IAFF website

The Providence Fire Department provides fire protection and emergency medical services to the city of Providence, Rhode Island.

== History ==
Providence's first fire department was organized in 1759. The state General Assembly raised money to purchase the town's first large water engine, and required every citizen to acquire a pair of two-gallon leather buckets to form volunteer bucket brigades.

On March 1, 1854, a paid fire department was established, making it the second oldest professional fire department in the country.

A years-long contract dispute between the city and the firefighter's union began in 2001. Mayor David Cicilline promised to resolve the dispute within 30 days of his election in 2002, but was unable to reach an agreement. In 2009, the dispute became national news as Vice President Joe Biden refused to attend the national mayor’s conference, held that year in Providence, so as not to cross the picket line.

As part of a 2017 agreement reached by mayor Jorge Elorza, the Humboldt Avenue and Rochambeau Avenue firehouses were decommissioned to save costs.

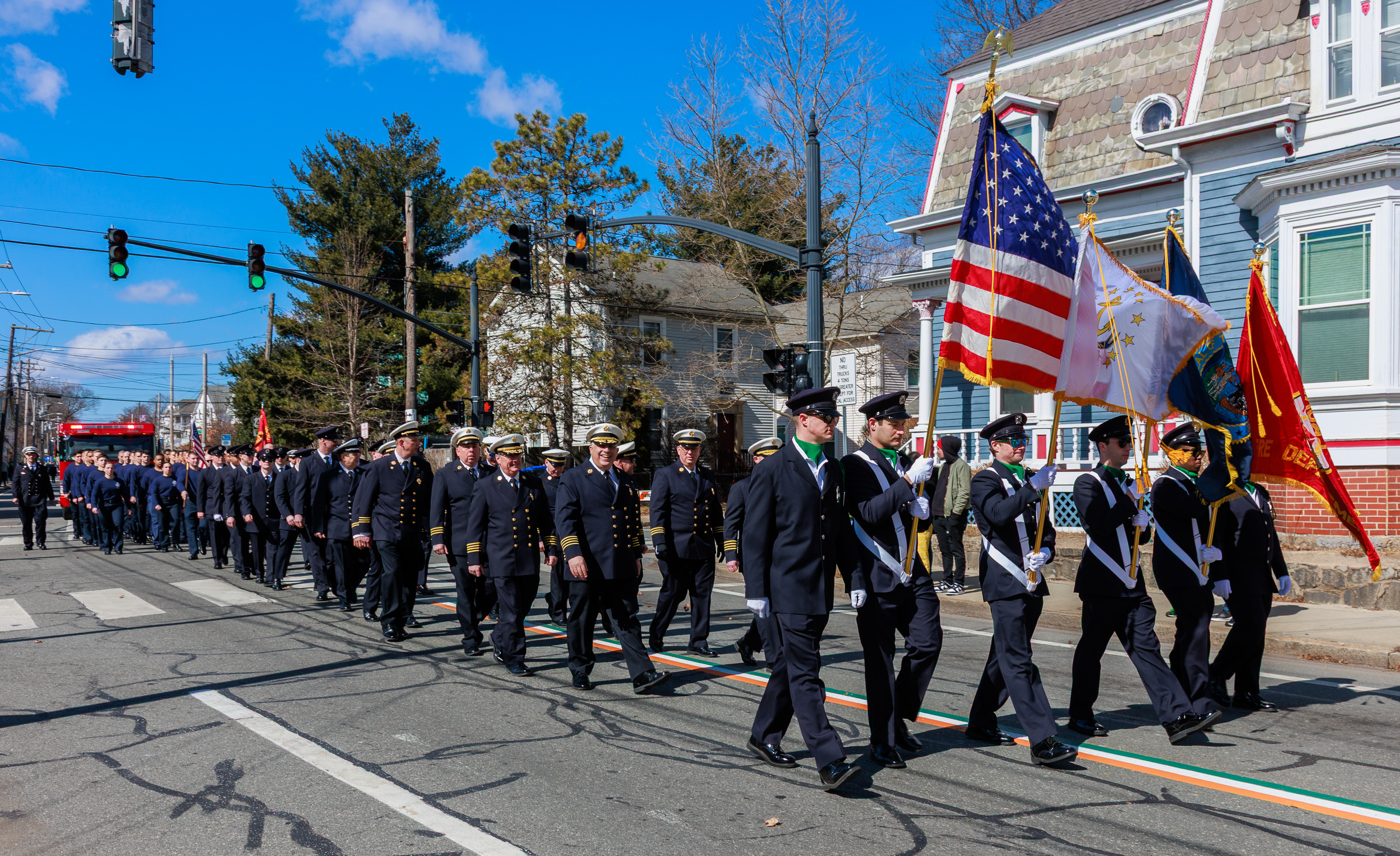
Providence Fire Department in the 2025 Saint Patrick's Day Parade

== Operations ==
=== Fire Station Locations and Apparatus ===
The PFD operates out of twelve fire stations, organized into three battalions

Engine Company	Ladder Company	EMS Rescue Ambulance Units	Special Unit	Chief Unit	Address	Neighborhood	Battalion
Engine 2	Ladder 7	EMS Rescue Ambulance Unit 3	Marine Unit	Battalion Chief 3	10 Branch Ave.	Mt. Hope	3
Engine 3	Tower Ladder 1	Rescue 4	Special Hazards 1(Heavy Rescue & Haz-Mat)	Division Chief 1(Deputy Chief), Safety Battalion Chief	325 Washington St.	Federal Hill	1
Engine 6		Rescue 2			489 Hartford Ave.	Hartford	2
Engine 7		Rescue 5	Air Cascade Unit 1		151 N. Main St.	College Hill	3
Engine 8	Tower Ladder 2			Battalion Chief 2	201 Messer St.	West End	2
Engine 9	Ladder 8		Fireboat 1		223 Brook St.	Fox Point	3
Engine 10	Ladder 5	Rescue 1			847 Broad St.	Lower South Providence	1
Engine 11					274 Reservoir Ave.	Reservoir	1
Engine 12	Ladder 3	Rescue 7			426 Admiral St.	Elmhurst	3
Engine 13			Foam Unit	Battalion Chief 1	776 Allens Ave.	Washington Park	1
Engine 14	Ladder 6	Rescue 6			639 Atwells Ave.	Valley	2
Engine 15			Car 56, Car 72 (Fire Investigations)		136 Mt. Pleasant Ave.	Mt. Pleasant	2

== Former stations ==
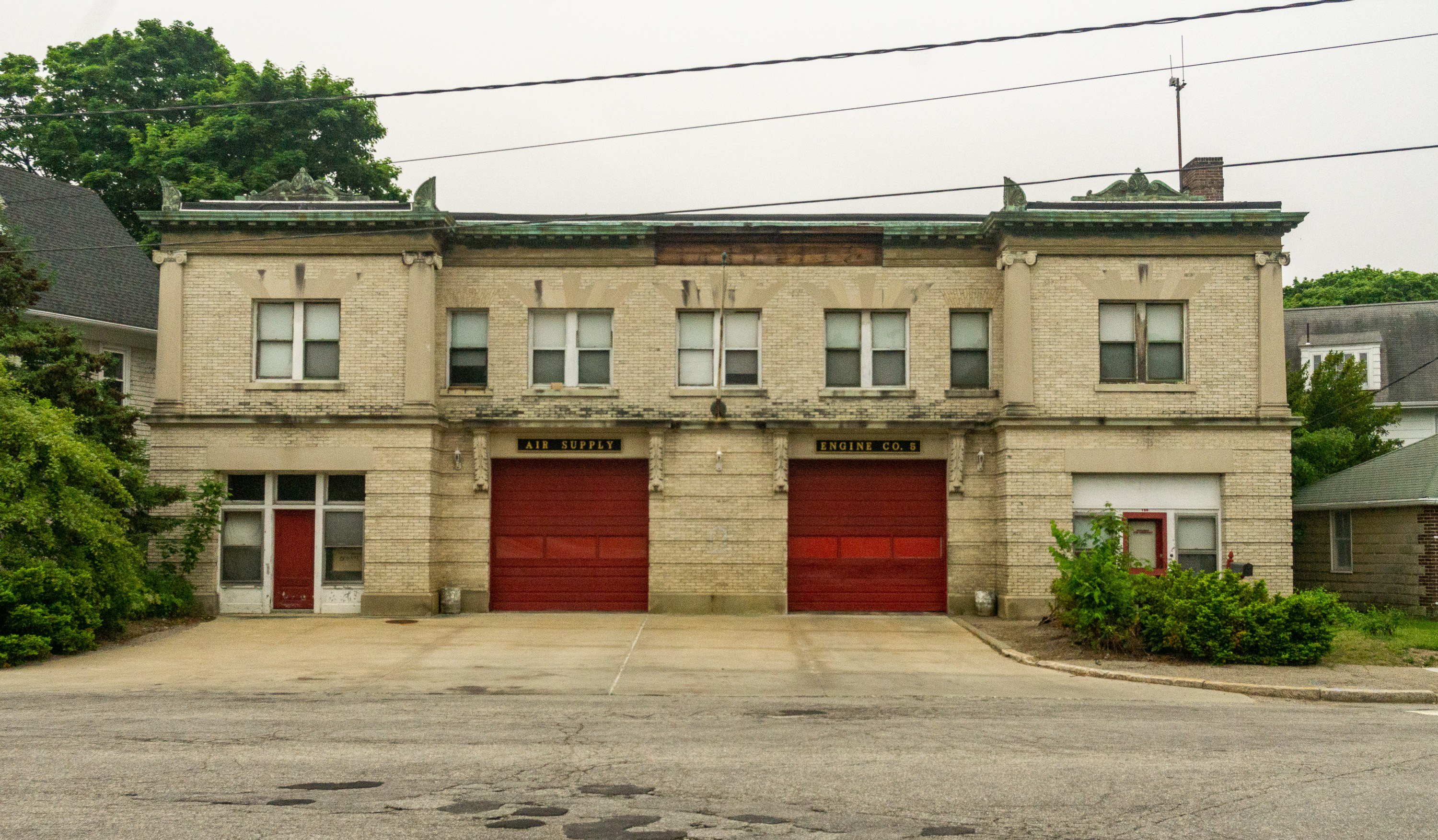
Humboldt Avenue Fire Station (decommissioned 2017)
