= Angelo's Civita Farnese =

Italian restaurant, Rhode Island

- Location within Rhode Island

Restaurant information
- Established: 1924; 102 years ago
- Owner: Bob Antignano
- Previous owner: Angelo Mastrodicasa
- Food type: Italian
- Dress code: Casual
- Location: 141 Atwells Ave, Providence, RI, 02903, United States
- Coordinates: 41°49′24.23″N 71°25′22.02″W
- Website: www.angelosri.com

Angelo's Civita Farnese is a popular Italian restaurant in the Federal Hill neighborhood of Providence, Rhode Island.

Founded in 1924, it is known as much for its atmosphere as for its food. The seating is family-style. Ownership of the restaurant has remained in the same family since it opened.

It features regularly in Rhode Island Monthly's "Best of Rhode Island" awards. In 1999, Esquire listed it in its "Greatest Lunch Ever Made" feature.

== See also ==
- List of Italian restaurants
