= Federal Hill, Providence, Rhode Island =

Coordinates: 41.82°N 71.43°W

Federal Hill
- Neighborhood of Providence
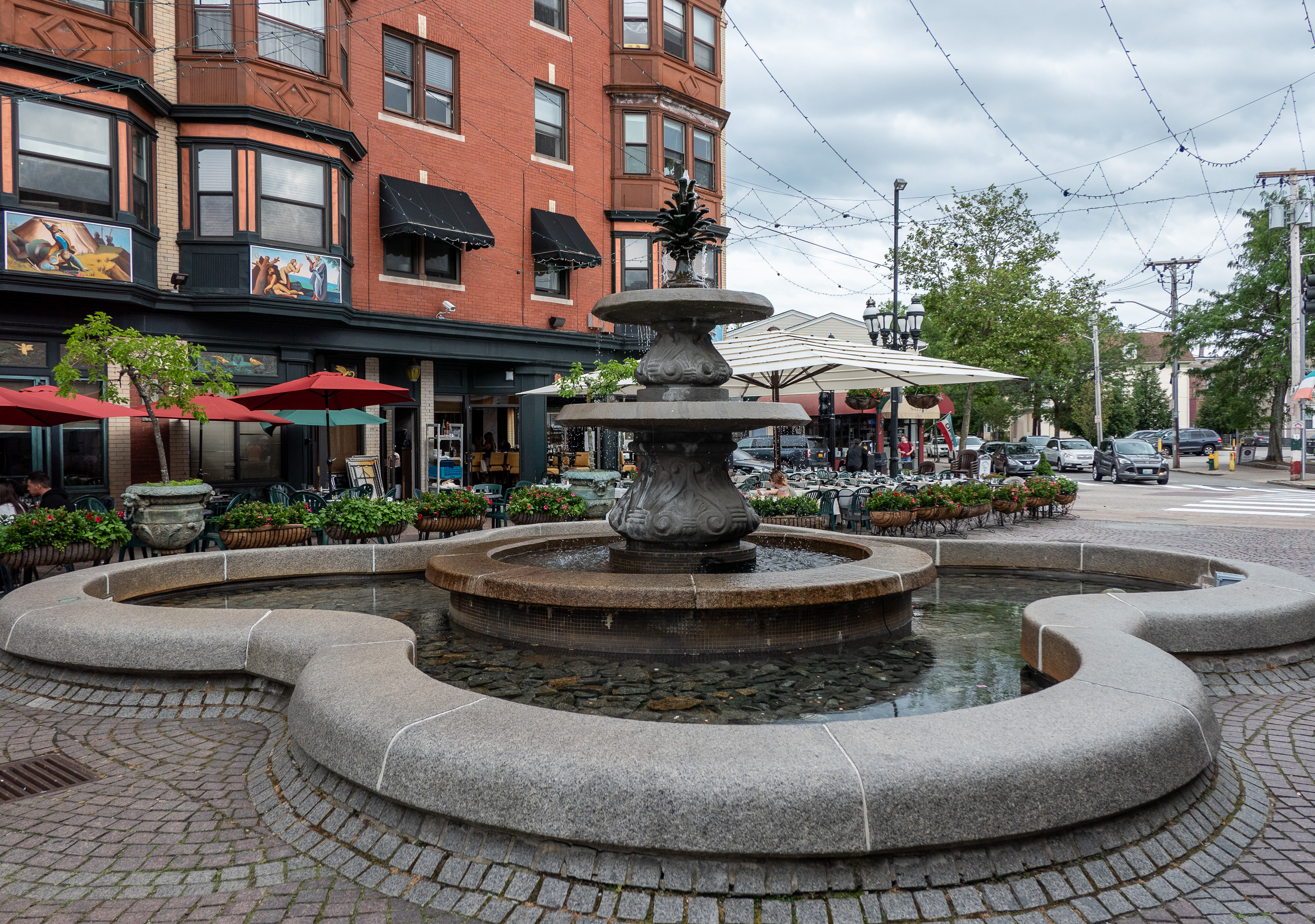
- DePasquale Plaza is the heart of Federal Hill

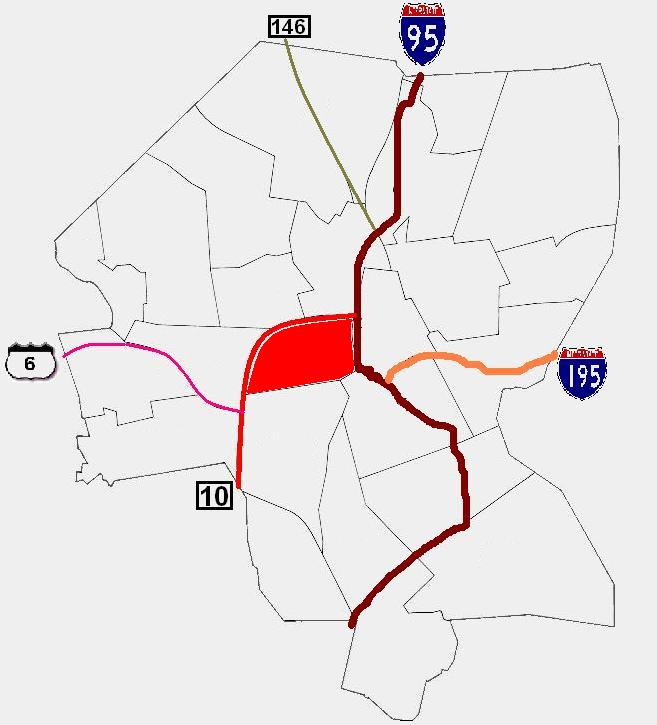
- Providence neighborhoods with Federal Hill in red
- Country: United States
- State: Rhode Island
- County: Providence County
- City: Providence

Federal Hill is a neighborhood in Providence, Rhode Island. It lies immediately west of the city's Downtown, across Interstate 95. Since the late 19th century, Federal Hill has been an enclave of Providence's Italian American community; today the neighborhood is noted for its abundance of Italian restaurants, markets, and cultural establishments.

== Geography ==
Federal Hill is bounded by Westminster Street to the south, Route 6 and Route 10 to the west and north, and Interstate 95 to the east. The area borders Downtown to the east, Smith Hill and Valley to the north, Olneyville to the west, and the West End and South Providence to the south.

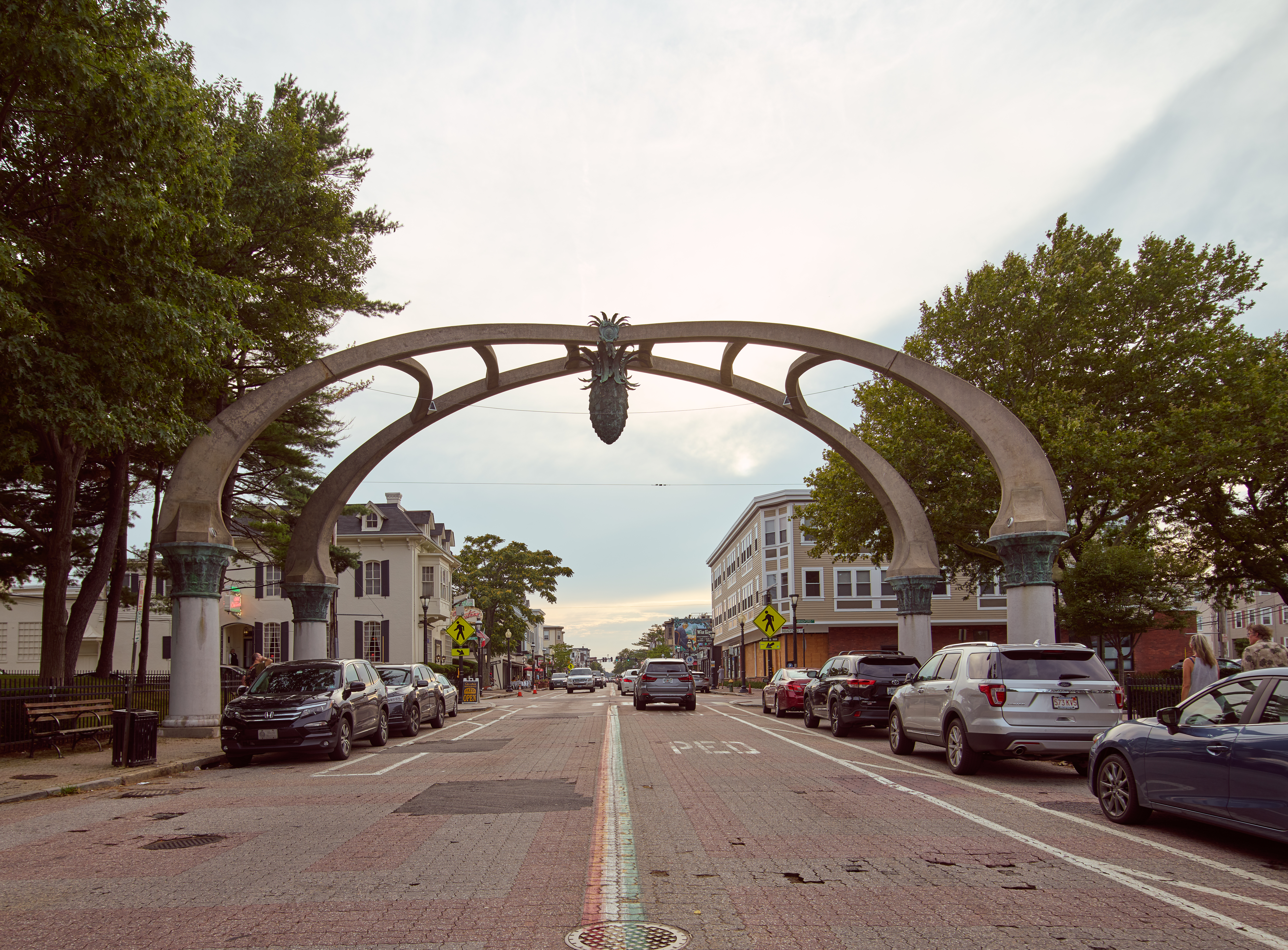
Gateway arch over Atwells Avenue. La Pigna sculpture, a traditional symbol of welcome, abundance and quality, hangs from the center.

The gateway arch over Atwells Avenue near Downtown is one of the most recognizable landmarks in Providence. The La Pigna (or The Pine Cone) sculpture hanging from its center – a traditional Italian symbol of welcome, abundance, and quality – is often mistakenly referred to as "The Pineapple" and has become the symbol of Federal Hill. Other important streets in the neighborhood include Broadway, home to restaurants as well as professional, medical and legal offices, but also to the historic Columbus Theatre. Other than a commercial and warehouse section in the area of Dean and Washington Streets, most of the rest of the neighborhood is residential, often catering to college students.

Most cross streets in the historic neighborhood between Atwells Avenue and Broadway are one-way due to their narrowness. A few streets remain paved with cobblestone.

=== DePasquale Plaza and fountain ===
DePasquale Plaza is a popular spot for outdoor dining and people-watching. The plaza features a central grand fountain surrounded by restaurants and outdoor dining. In the summer of 2018 the plaza's "famous" fountain was in a state of partial disrepair, with only two levels flowing and the base filled with plants. In April 2019 the fountain was struck by an automobile and became only partially working. The fountain was completely restored at a cost of about $500,000 in July 2020.

== History ==
Federal Hill received its name after a 1788 Fourth of July ox roast celebration on the plain adjacent to the hill. The organizers of the celebration intended to celebrate the ratification of the Federal Constitution by the 9 of the 13 states needed to create the United States. Because Anti-Federalist sentiment was strong in Rhode Island, General William West led 1,000 armed farmers to Providence to stop the celebration. Eventually, a compromise was reached and the celebrants agreed to celebrate Independence Day only and not the ratification of the Federal Constitution. The issue remained hotly controversial in Rhode Island for two more years until the state finally became the last of the original thirteen states to join the union.

The area of Federal Hill was originally called Nocabulabet, believed to be an anglicized version of either a Narragansett or Wampanoag phrase meaning "land above the river" or "land between the ancient waters".

Federal Hill's Atwells Avenue is named for Amos Maine Atwell, who led a syndicate of businessmen developing the western areas of the city in 1788. The area developed into a working class area during the early 19th century in part due to reverses in commercial shipping.

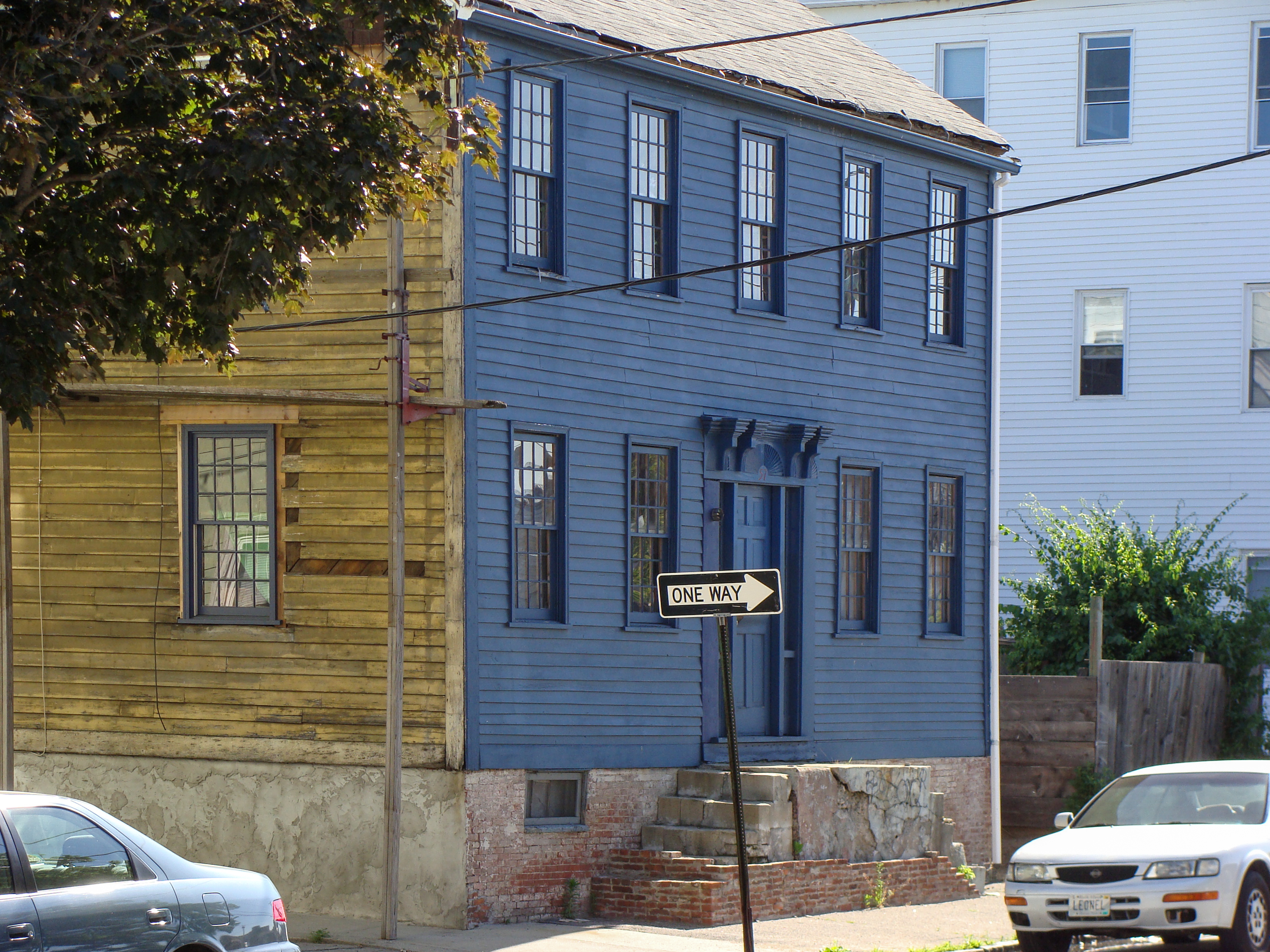
57 Federal Street, an early 19th century home, was one of the oldest in the neighborhood prior to its demolition

In 1840, only the lower streets of the hill were occupied, and that mostly by Irish immigrants who worked in the nearby textile shops and foundries. Yet, by the early 1850s, part of Atwells Avenue was clustered with two- and three-story tenements that housed the large influx of those who fled the famine of 1845 to 1851. A third of these people came from the Barony of Truagh and surrounding townlands. This area, encompassing Northern County Monaghan and Southern County Tyrone, had for centuries been the fiefdom of the McKenna clan. Not incidentally, McKenna was, by far, the most common name on Federal Hill in the 1860s.

The 1870s saw the first arrival of immigrants from southern Italy, with greater numbers arriving in the next two decades. By 1895, the Hill was divided almost evenly between the Irish and the Italians. These were tension-filled times, as both groups fought for jobs and respect from the Yankee majority.

The first two decades of the 20th century witnessed heavy Italian-American immigration into Federal Hill. In the summer of 1914, residents rioted in a series of events that came to be known as the Macaroni Riots. Though the area today is more diverse, Federal Hill still retains its status as the traditional center for the city's Italian-American community. Providence's annual Columbus Day parade marches down Atwells Avenue, where the street's median is painted with the Italian flag's Tri-color instead of the usual double yellow lines.

In 1954, Raymond Loreda Salvatore Patriarca Sr, the newly appointed boss of the New England Faction of La Cosa Nostra (Now known as the Patriarca Crime Family), made drastic changes to the family, the biggest being moving the family's base of operations from Boston to Atwells Ave in Federal Hill. He ran the crime family from 1954 until 1984 from the National Cigarette Service Company and Coin-O-Matic Distributors, a vending machine and pinball business on Atwells Avenue. The business was known to family members as "The Office".

== Demographics ==
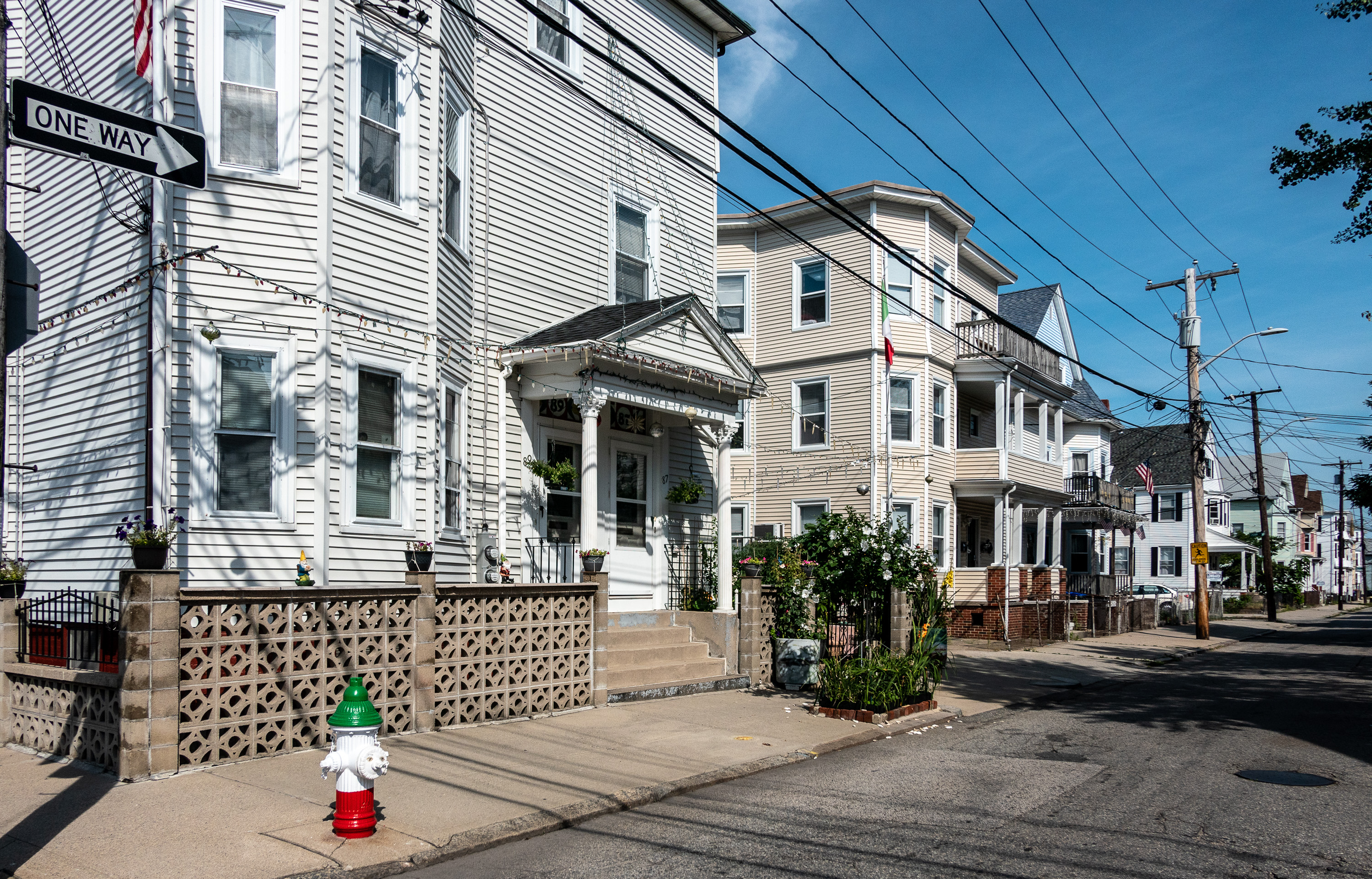
Houses on Federal Hill

For census purposes, the Census Bureau classifies Federal Hill as part of the Census Tract Area 9, 10 and 11. This neighborhood had 8,005 inhabitants based on data from the 2020 United States Census.

The racial makeup of the neighborhood was 66.62% (5,333) White (Non-Hispanic), 7.01% (561) Black (Non-Hispanic), 1.77% (1,869) Asian, 3.31% (1,693) from some other race or from two or more races. Hispanic or Latino of any race were 21.15% (1,693) of the population. 15.73% are foreign born, with most foreign born residents originating from Latin America (64.07%).

The median age in this area is around 43 years old. Family Households made up 30.58% of the population, and the average household (family and non-family) had around 1.8 persons living there. 21.12% of the population was married. Out of the 4,369 vacant and non-vacant housing units, 16.48% were owner occupied, and 65.30% renter occupied. (18.17% were vacant housing units). The average house was worth slightly lower than the average in Providence.

== Government ==
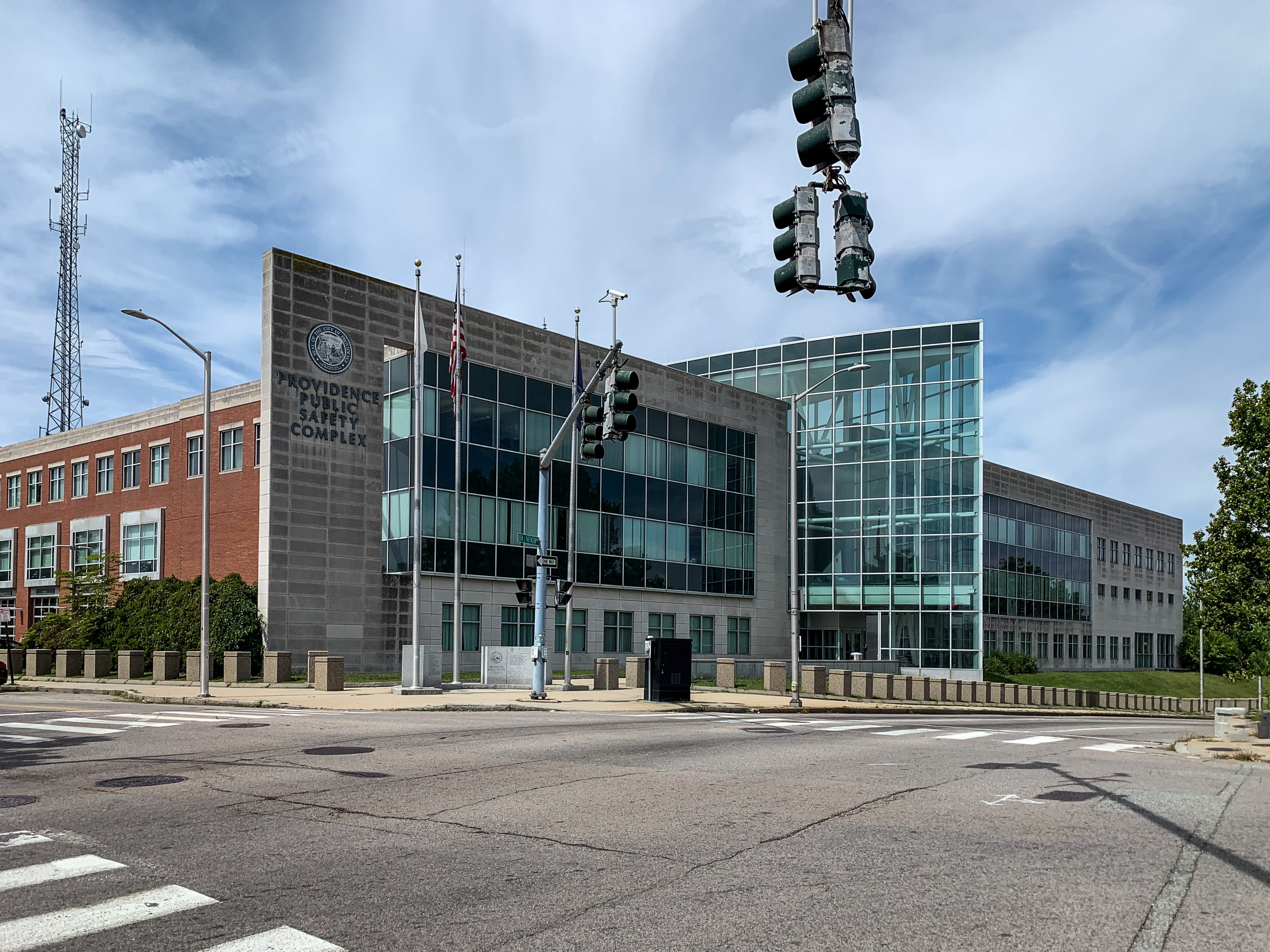
Public Safety Complex

Nearly all of Federal Hill is within Ward 13, which is represented in the Providence City Council by Democrat Rachel Miller. A small portion of Federal Hill is in Ward 15, represented by Democrat Oscar Vargas.

The Providence Public Safety Complex is located on Federal Hill at 325 Washington Street. The complex is the headquarters of the Providence Police Department, the Providence Fire Department and the city's municipal courts. The building was dedicated in 2002 by former Mayor Vincent Cianci Jr. The courts and particularly Judge Frank Caprio have been made famous locally by the television show Caught in Providence, which documents the proceedings of the municipal court.

== Parks ==
Monument to Giovanni da Verrazzano in St. John's Park

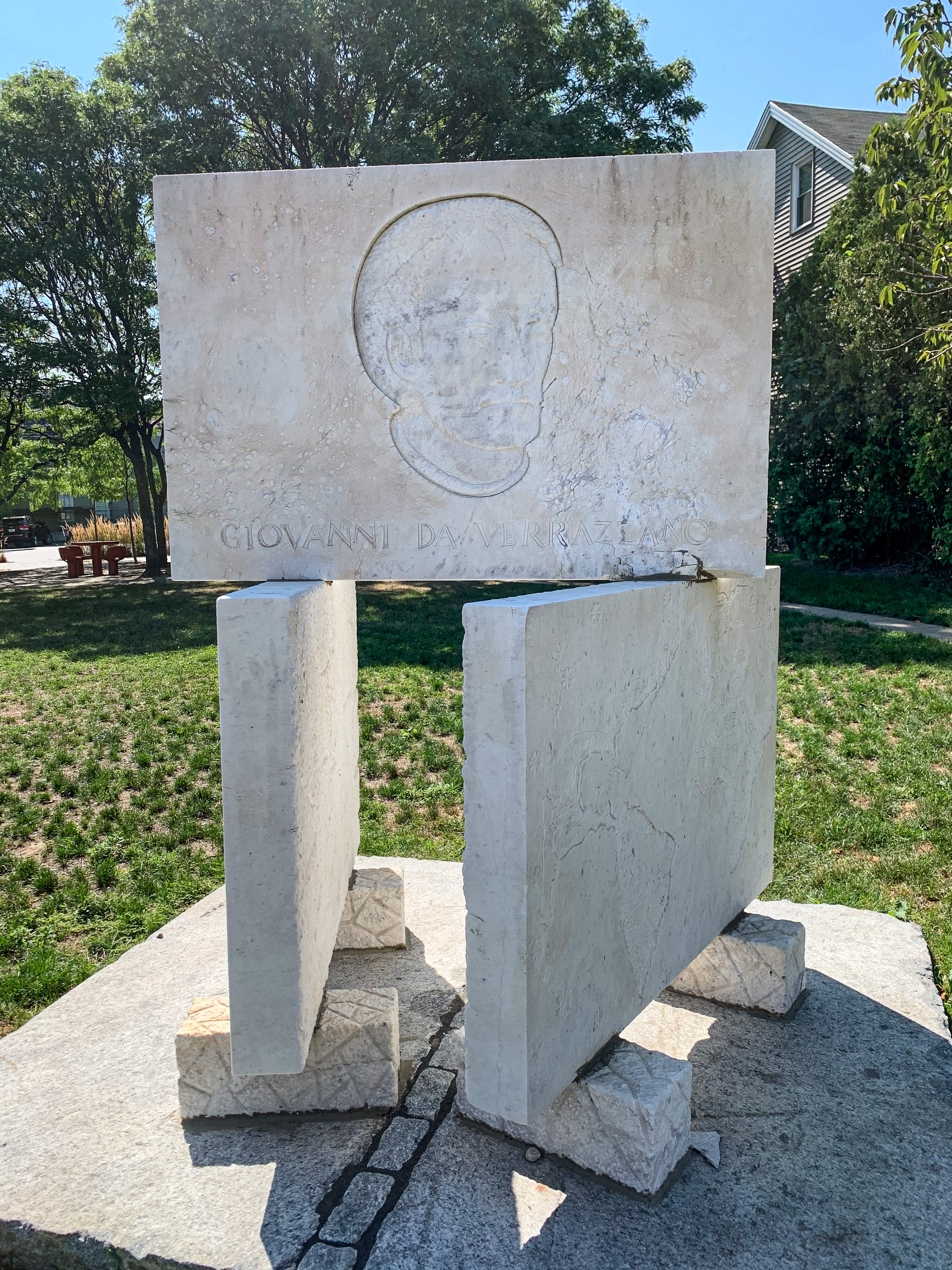
Front

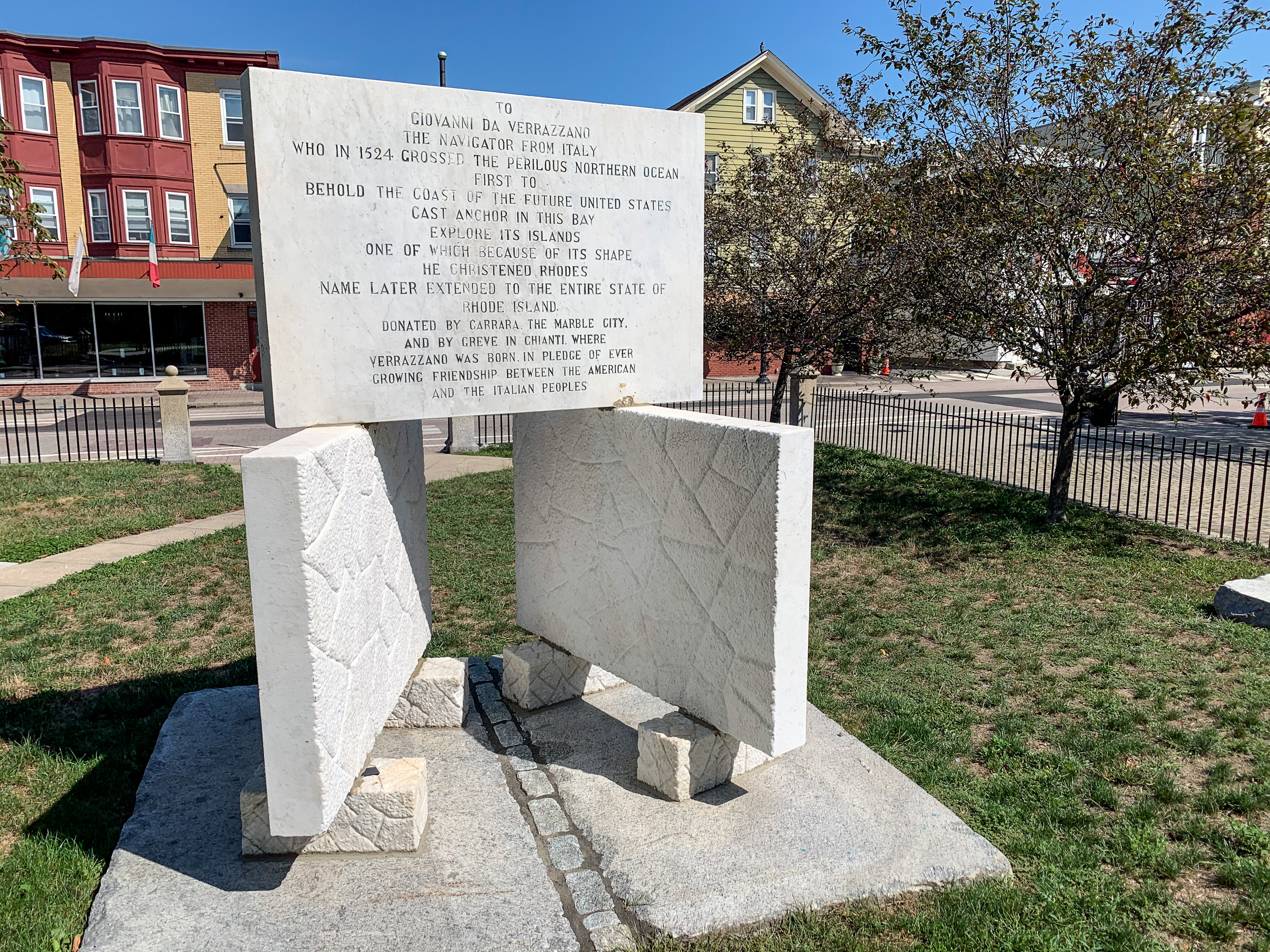
Rear

Federal Hill includes three public spaces along Atwells Avenue:

- Garibaldi Square is a half-acre square featuring a monumental bust of Giuseppe Garibaldi.
- DePasquale Plaza is a plaza used for outdoor dining.
- St. John's Park is a small park at the former location of St John's Church.

Another large green space is Franciscan Park (or Bell Street Dog Park), a two and a half acre dog park, located off Broadway near Route 6.

Also, the Spruce Street Bocce Courts on the northwest corner of Spruce and Dean streets has benches and two lighted bocce courts and serves as the home of several local bocce leagues, the largest being the popular Nocabulabet Bocce League which hosts games on Wednesday nights during its spring and fall seasons.

== Culinary reputation ==
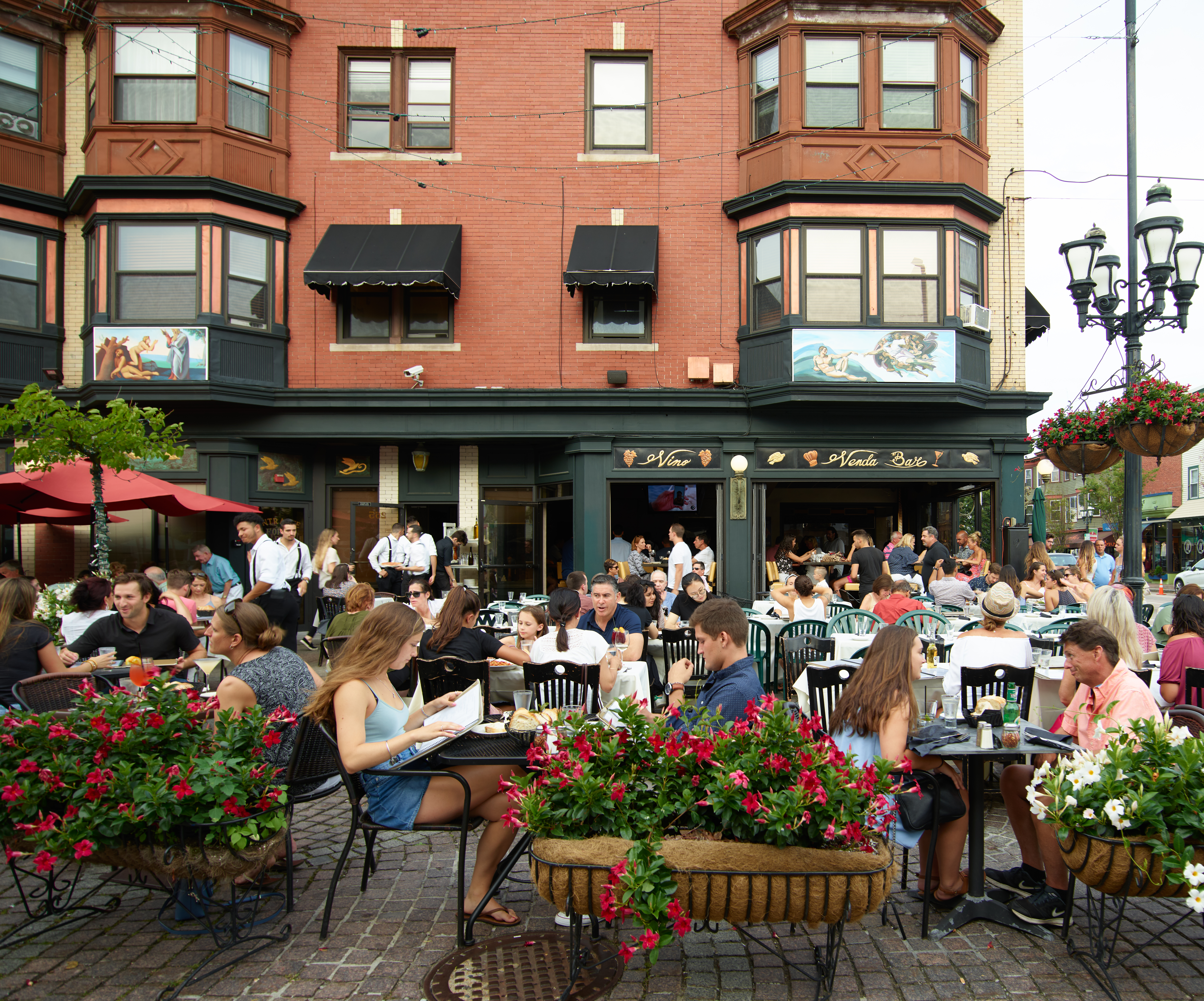
Friday night diners at DePasquale Plaza

Federal Hill is often characterized by its culinary reputation. Atwells Avenue has over twenty restaurants within a quarter mile section, such as Angelo's Civita Farnese. The area's proximity to Johnson and Wales University has allowed Providence to attract and retain skilled chefs, many of whom work in restaurants on Atwells Avenue.

== In popular culture ==
Federal Hill plays a central role in the story "The Haunter of the Dark" by Providence-born writer H.P. Lovecraft. It is the site of a church which in the story was used by a sect called the Church of Starry Wisdom for their services, and houses the Shining Trapezohedron and the 'Haunter' itself - a creature summoned from time and space and said to be an avatar of Nyarlathotep. The church that figures prominently in the story was based on St. John's Church, an actual church on Atwells Avenue that was built in 1873 and demolished in 1992. It was, in Lovecraft's day, the principal Catholic church in the area. The description of the interior and belfry of the church is quite accurate.
