= Manton, Providence, Rhode Island =

Residential neighborhood

Coordinates: 41.8339°N 71.4667°W

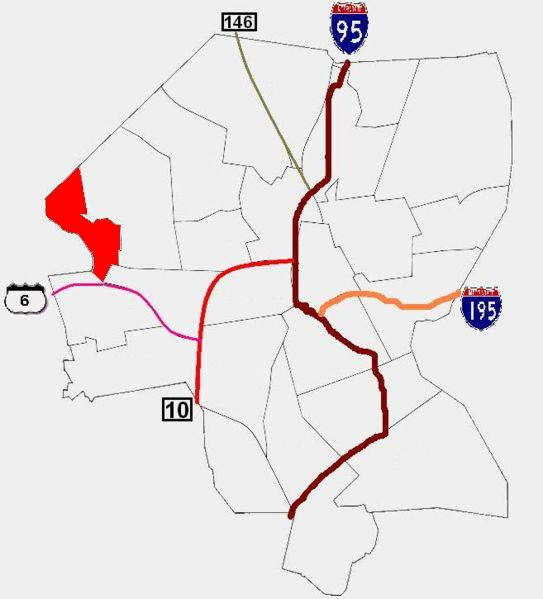
Providence neighborhoods with Manton in red

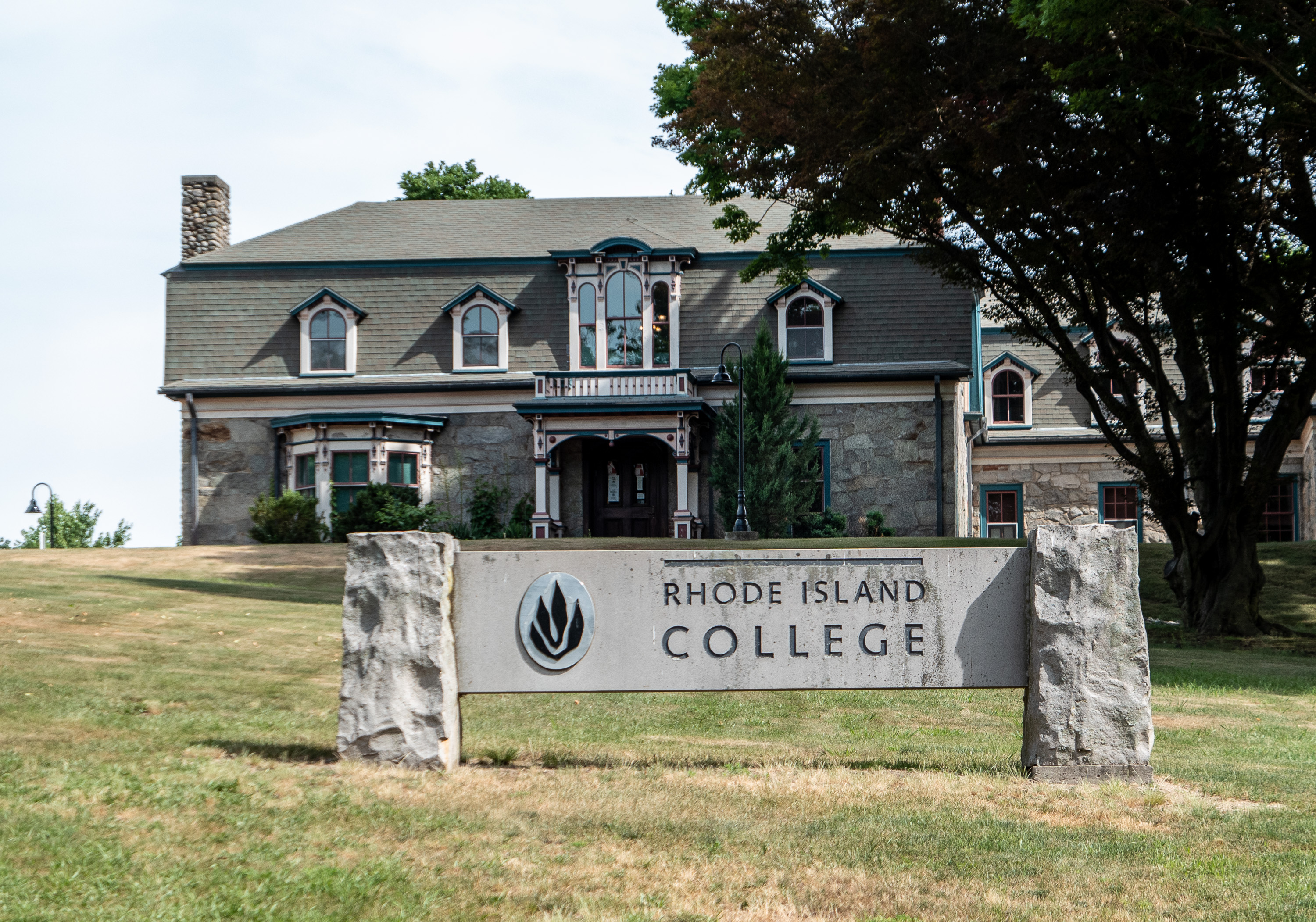
Rhode Island College

Manton is a residential neighborhood in Providence, Rhode Island and part of Johnston, Rhode Island. It is in the westernmost part of the city. of Providence The town of North Providence borders it to the north, Johnston to the west, while the neighborhoods of Hartford, Olneyville, and Mount Pleasant border it inside Providence. Separating it from other Providence neighborhoods to its east are Rushmore Ave, Chalkstone Ave, Smith Street, and the Triggs Memorial Golf Course. The Woonasquatucket River separates it from Johnston to the west.

Throughout the 17th and 18th centuries, Manton remained a rural agrarian region. The eponymous Edward Manton was one of the original land owners, whose family would accumulate a huge tract of land. Toward the late 18th and early 19th centuries, the proximity of the Woonasquatucket River was responsible for the establishment of a few tanneries in Manton and neighboring Olneyville. The rural location of Manton made it ideal for the establishment of vacation homes. A stagecoach inn was one of the earliest places to take summer vacations. In 1835, the hotel was converted to a school. In 1862, the school was demolished to make way for present-day Rhode Island College.

Taking advantage of the water power provided by the Woonasquatucket River, early industrialists established mills, the first two being constructed in 1827 and 1830. Railroad lines running east through Olneyville to Downtown facilitated the rapid development of the area, which was heavily industrial by the end of the 19th century.

The closure of the textile mills and collapse of heavy industry encouraged the exodus of working class residents to the suburbs. A public housing project, Manton Heights, was built in 1953, and may have contributed to the white flight. During the 1970s, Manton lost 15 percent of its population. By the 1980s, Manton Heights had, like so many public housing complexes, fallen into disrepair. The Manton-Fruit Hill Neighborhood Association was founded about this time and encourages neighborhood participation and improvement.

== Demographics ==
Manton's population nearly doubled from 1,406 in 1980 to 2,584 in 1990. In 1990, 90 percent of Manton was white, 4 percent Native American, 2 percent black, and 1 percent Hispanic. Almost two-thirds of residents over the age of 25 had completed high school. The largest sources of employment were professional services (28.2%), manufacturing (21.4%), and retail trade (19.4%). The 11.2 percent unemployment rate in Manton is higher than the 9.2 percent rate for the city as a whole.

The median family income in Manton in 1989 was $27,262, which is 4 percent lower than the citywide average. Poverty rate had increased from 2.1 percent in 1980 to 12.2 percent in 1990, while families below the poverty line rose from 2.1 percent to 8.6 percent. The rate of elderly living in poverty rose from 2.9 percent in 1980 to 23.9 percent in 1990.

The number of housing units in Manton more than doubled recently, increasing from 549 in 1980 to 1,227 in 1990. Since most of these were rental units, the owner-occupied units declined from 63 percent to 41.7 percent.

The housing stock in Manton is also fairly new. More than one in three units were built within the last decade, and almost half of all units were constructed within the past 20 years. The median value of a single family owner-occupied housing unit in Manton in 1990 was $103,900, which was 7 percent lower than the citywide median. The median rent in Manton was 8 percent lower than the citywide figure.
