= Mount Hope, Providence, Rhode Island =

Coordinates: 41.842°N 71.408°W

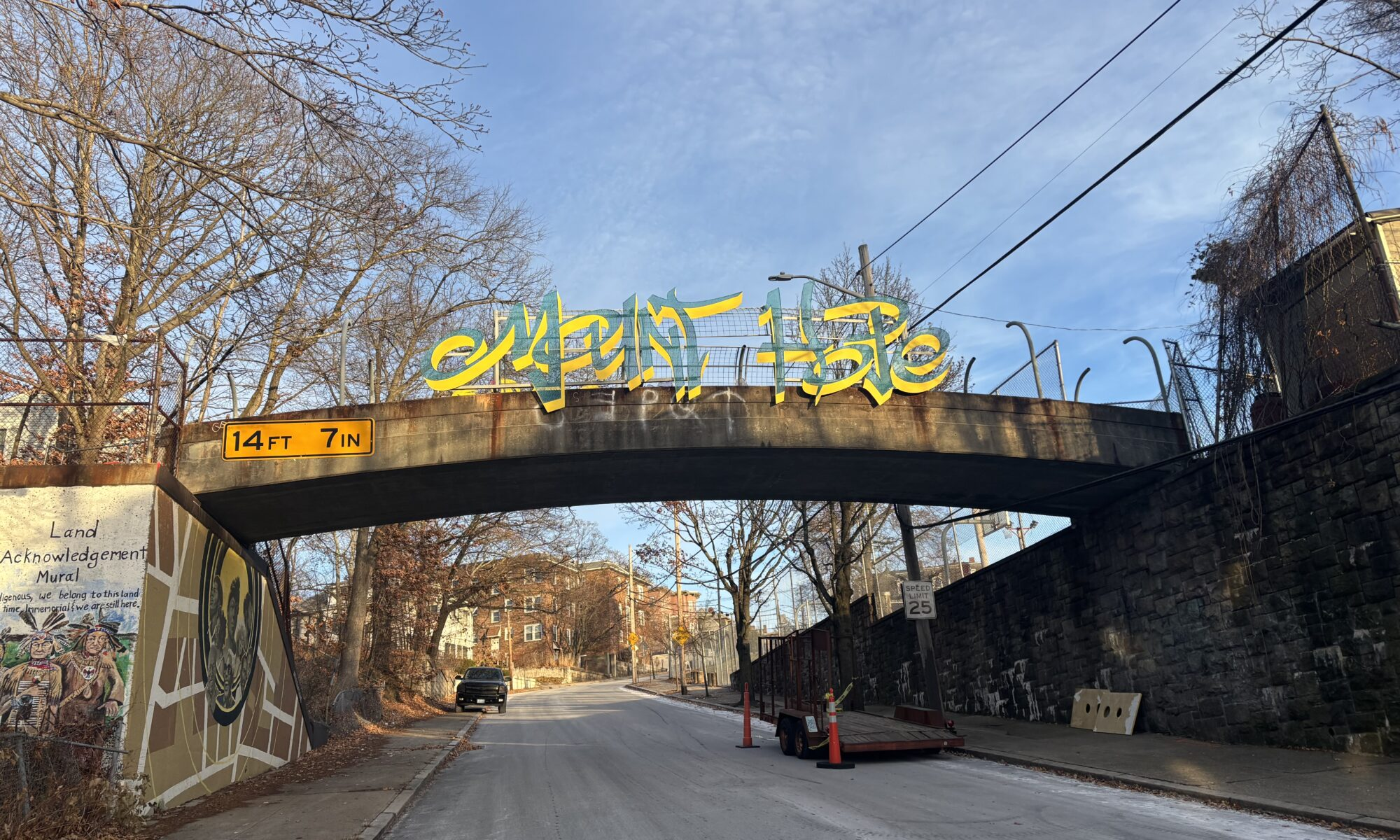
Billy Taylor Park overpass over Cypress St.

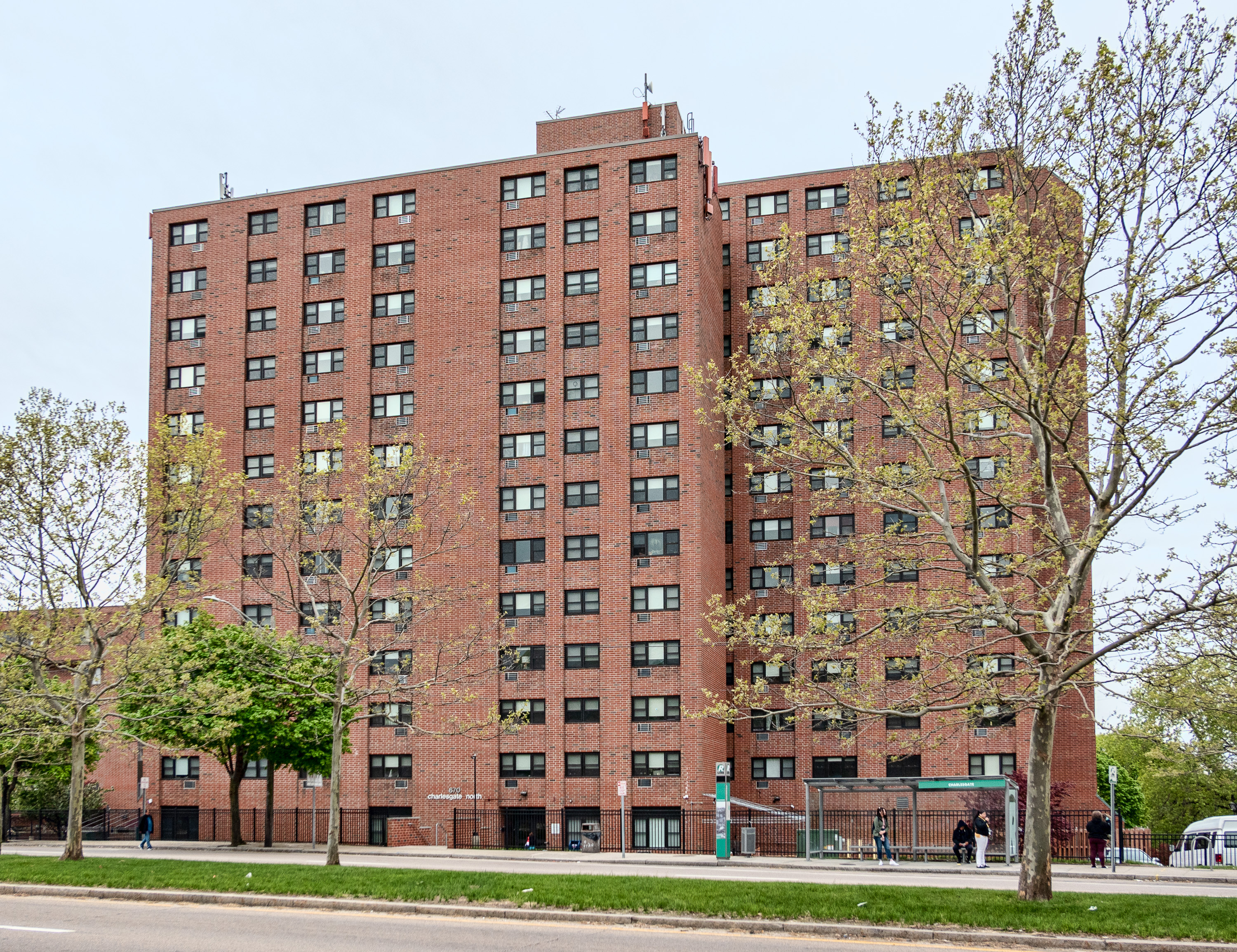
Charlesgate apartments on North Main Street

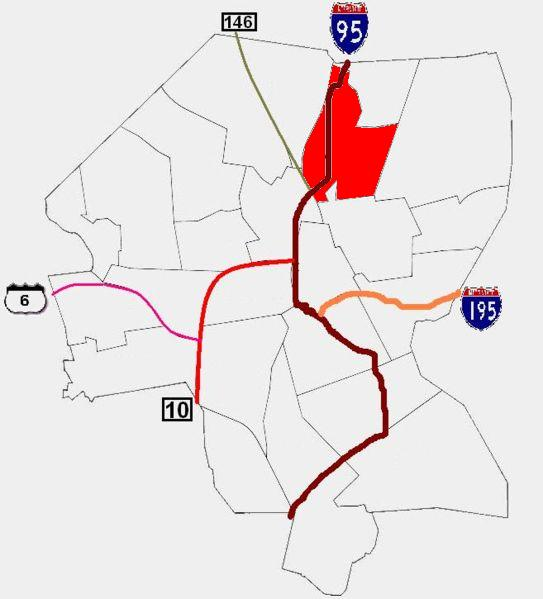
Providence neighborhoods with Mount Hope in red

Mount Hope is a neighborhood in northern Providence, Rhode Island. It is one of six neighborhoods comprising the East Side of Providence. The area is bounded to the north by Rochambeau Avenue, to the east by Hope Street, to the south by Olney Street, while the western border is the former New York-New Haven Railroad (now Amtrak and MBTA) and Interstate 95.

Camp Street is often used as a landmark for the neighborhood, as it runs lengthwise through Mount Hope's center. The area includes the North Burial Ground.

== History ==
The Mount Hope area was settled during the late 17th century. While not much has survived from that era, the Jeremiah Dexter Farmhouse (built in 1754) is the oldest recorded structure still standing in Mount Hope. In the 19th century, the southern region of Mount Hope experienced a large boom in population, specifically attracting African-Americans. Most of the residents of this area were former slaves, as the Gradual Emancipation Act, passed in 1784, freed all enslaved children born in Rhode Island and led to an increase of freed African-Americans in Providence during the early 19th century. (However, Rhode Island did not make slavery illegal until 1843.) This led to a crisis in Providence, as the higher population made housing prices increase. In Mount Hope, and other areas of Providence, working-class white people blamed these problems on the African-Americans and perpetrated various race riots called the Hard Scrabble and Snow Town riots in 1824 and 1831.

In the 20th Century, the area gentrified due to North Providence attracting numerous factories from 1930-1960. This led to job opportunities in the area, forcing the Providence City Council to enact the Lippitt Hill Redevelopment Project, which rebuilt most of Mount Hope. Controversially, this project targeted predominantly African-American areas and forced the community to move to other areas of Providence. After 1980, the area was predominantly White for the first time in over 200 years.

== Demographics ==
For census purposes, the Census Bureau classifies Mount Hope as part of a larger zip-code tabulation area called 02906. This neighborhood had 26,327 inhabitants based on data from the 2020 United States Census.

The racial makeup of Mount Hope was 52.8% (2,836) White (Non-Hispanic), 18.3% (982) Black (Non-Hispanic), 3.2% (170) Asian, 5.0% (269) from some other race or from two or more races. Hispanic or Latino of any race were 20.8% (1,119) of the population. 22.3% are foreign born. The neighborhood has long held a sizeable Cape Verdean American and Black population centered around the intersection of Camp Street and Cypress Street, as well as in the University Heights Apartment Complex in between Olney Street, Camp Street, and Doyle Ave.

The median age in this area is 35.8 years old. Family Households made up 56% of the population, and the average house had 2.1 persons living there. 42% of the population was married. 50% of households (family and non-family) owned their houses, and 50% rented their houses. The average house was worth $582,700, which is higher than the average in Providence.

== Gallery ==
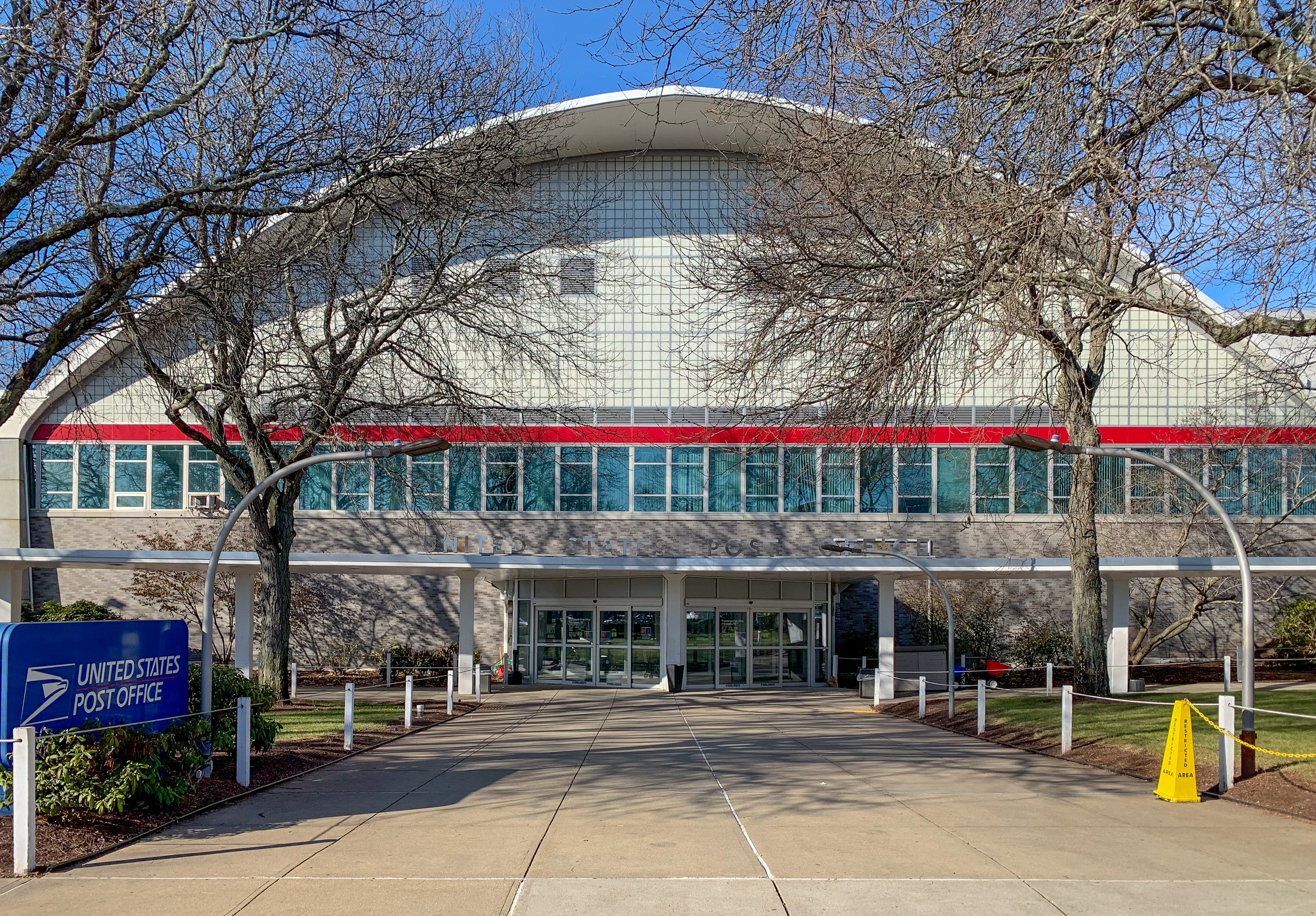
Mount Hope is served by the U.S. Post Office on Corliss Street. 1960, Maguire and Associates

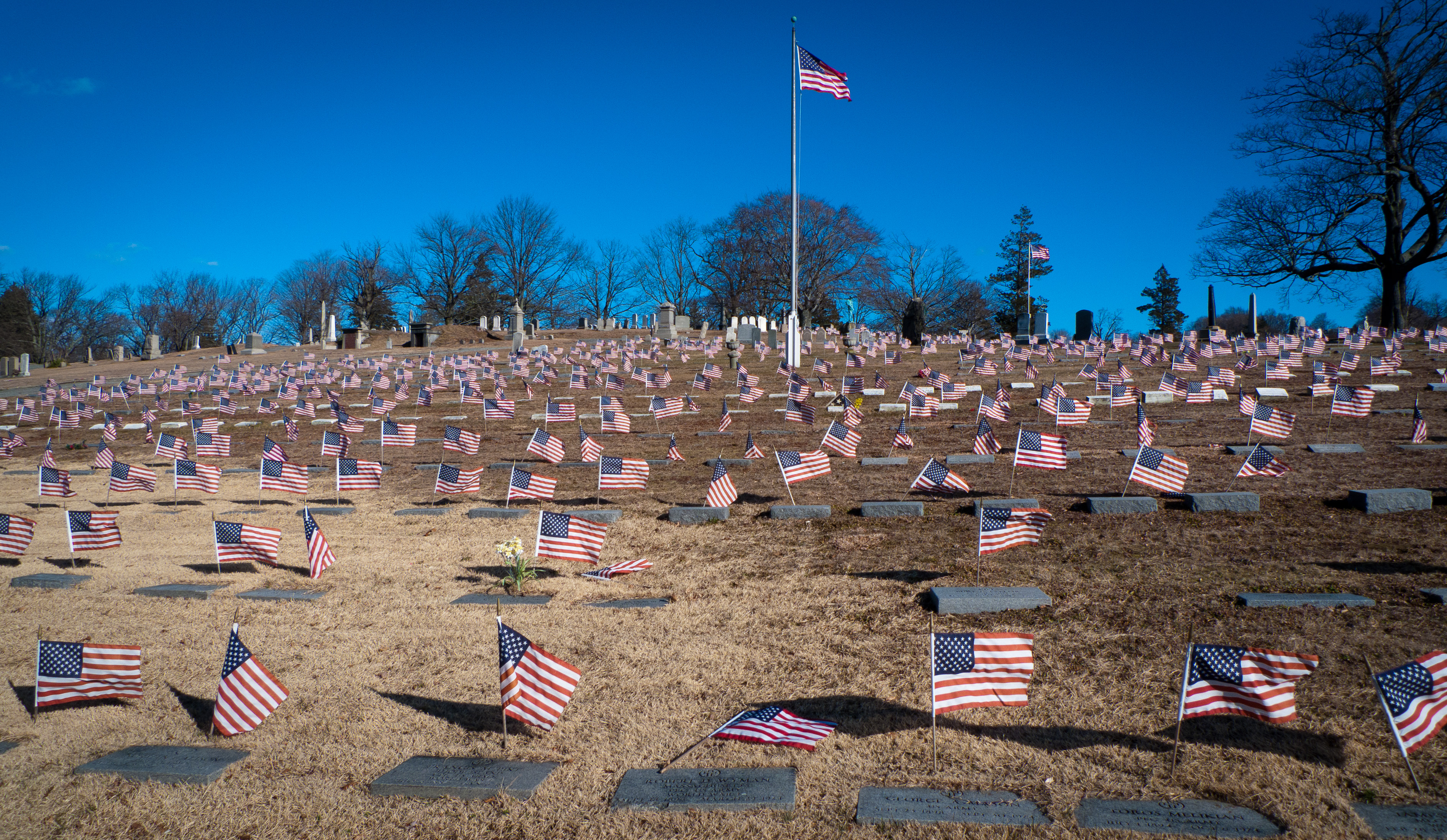
North Burial Ground

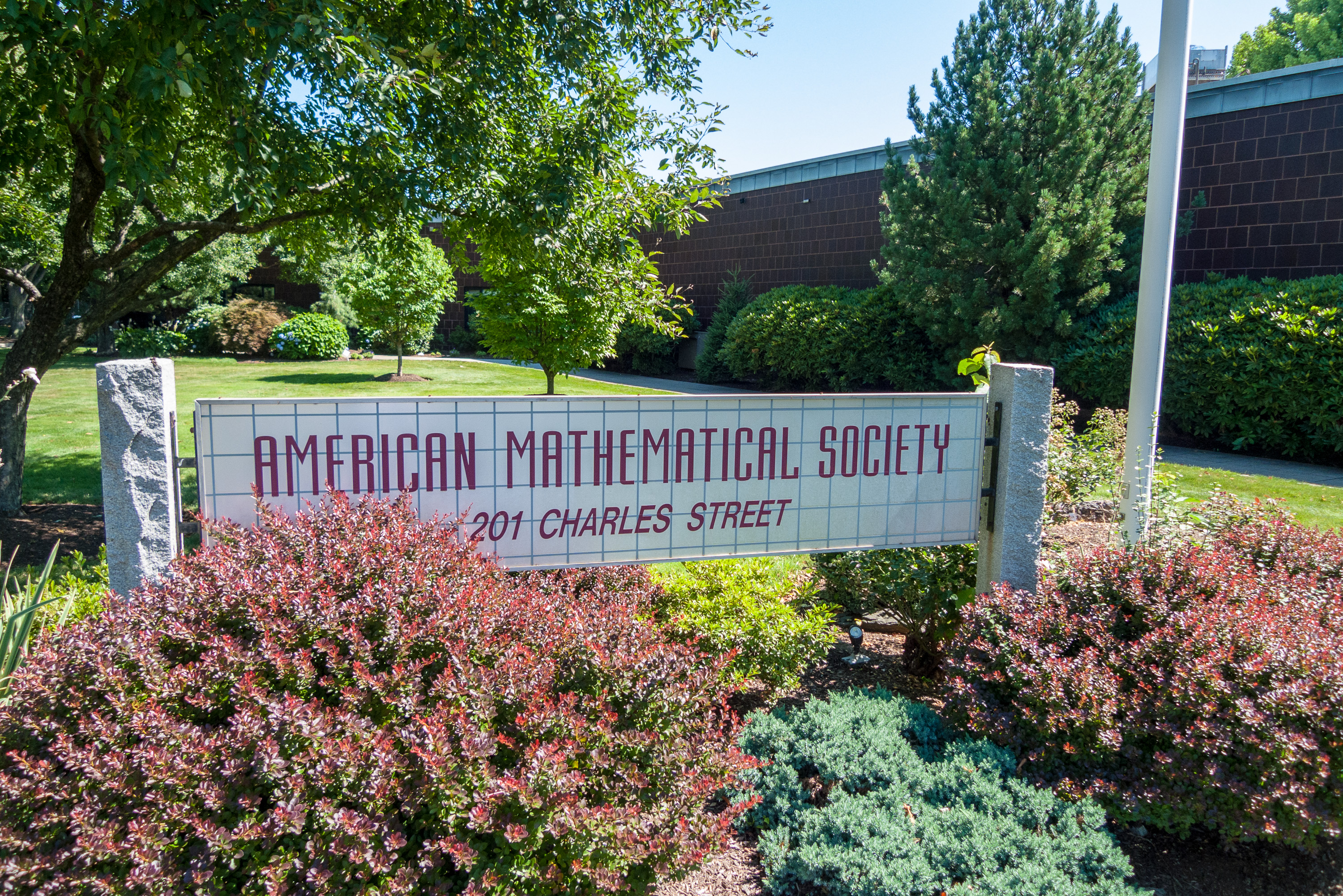
American Mathematical Society headquarters in Mount Hope

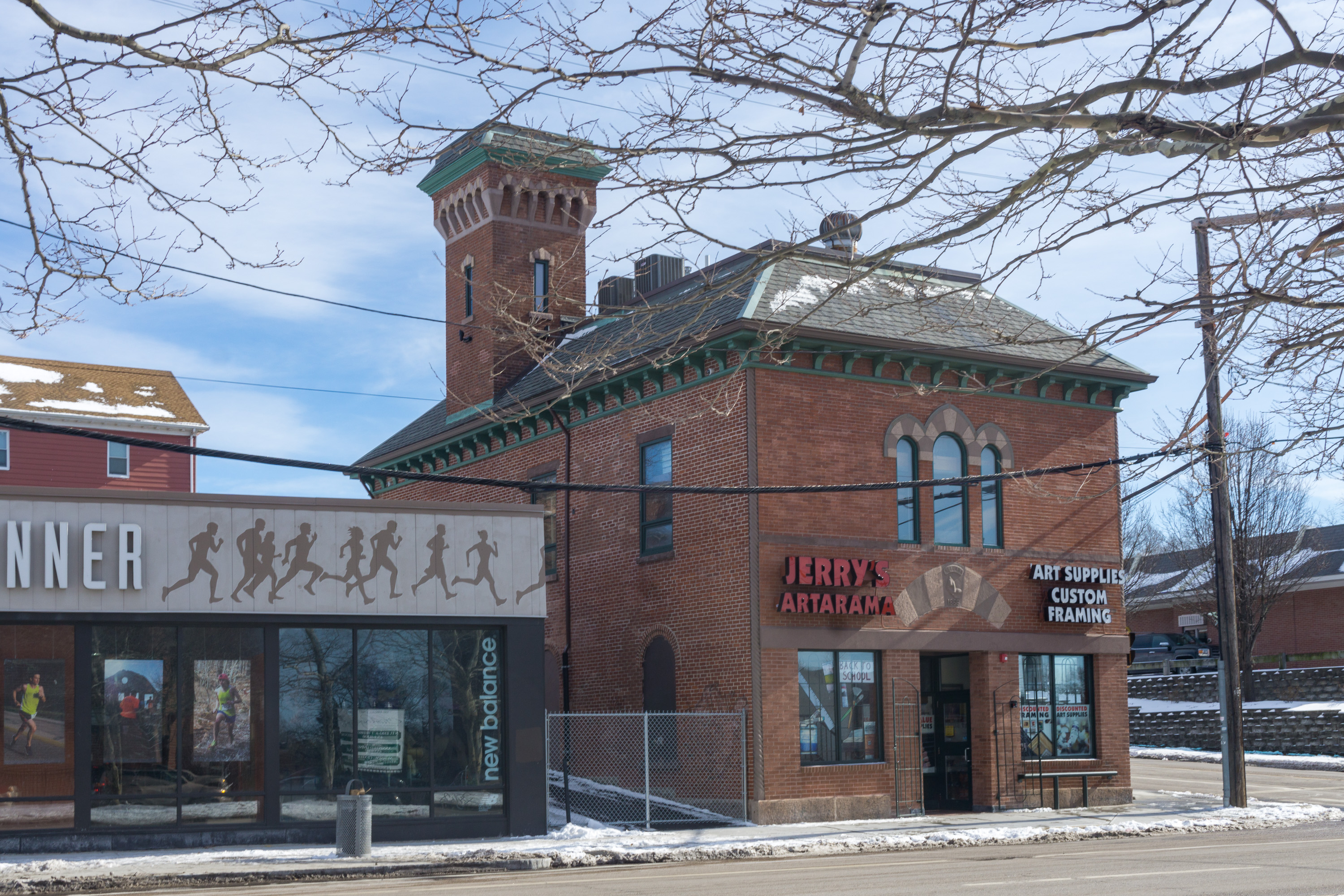
Retail along North Main Street

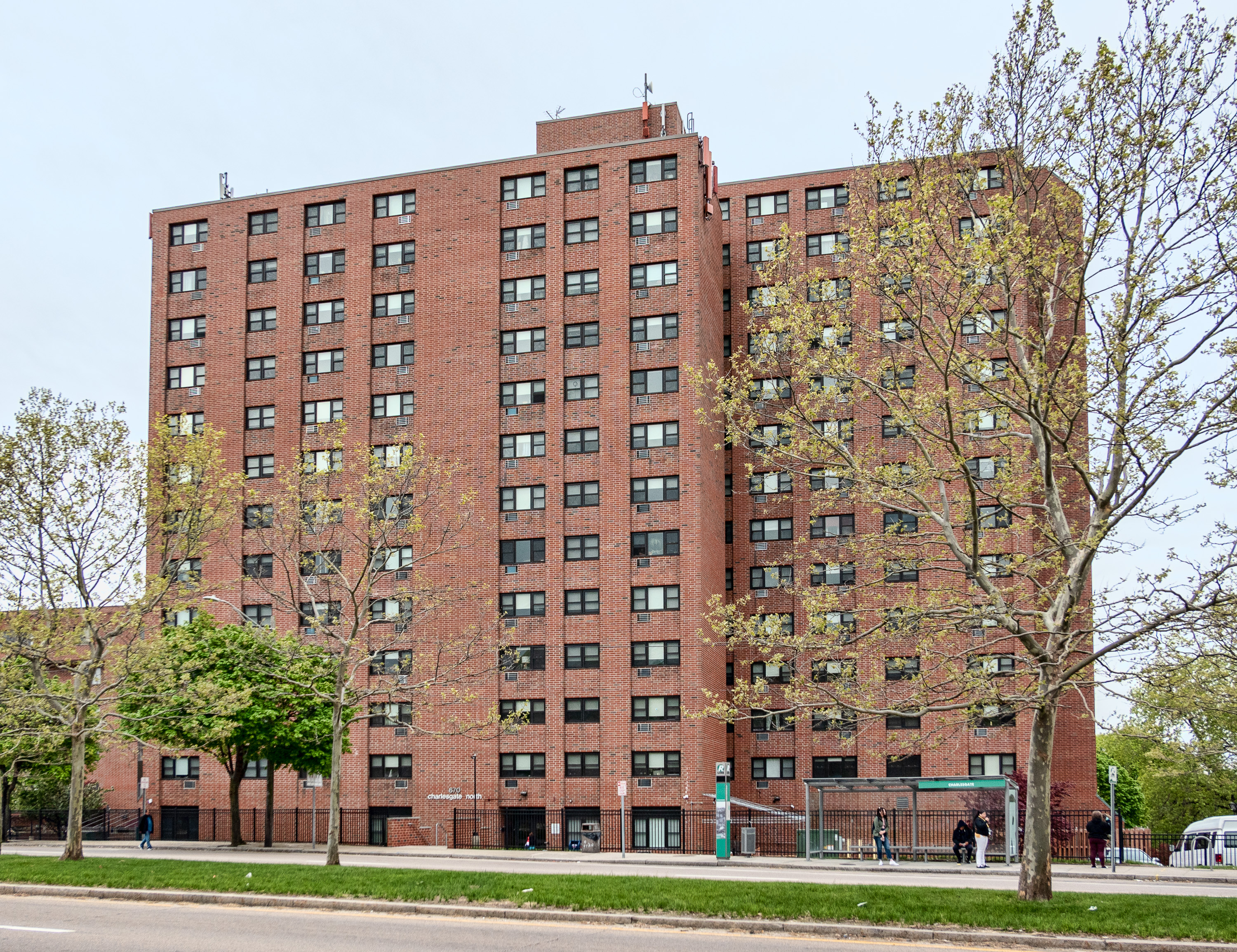
Charlesgate apartments on North Main Street

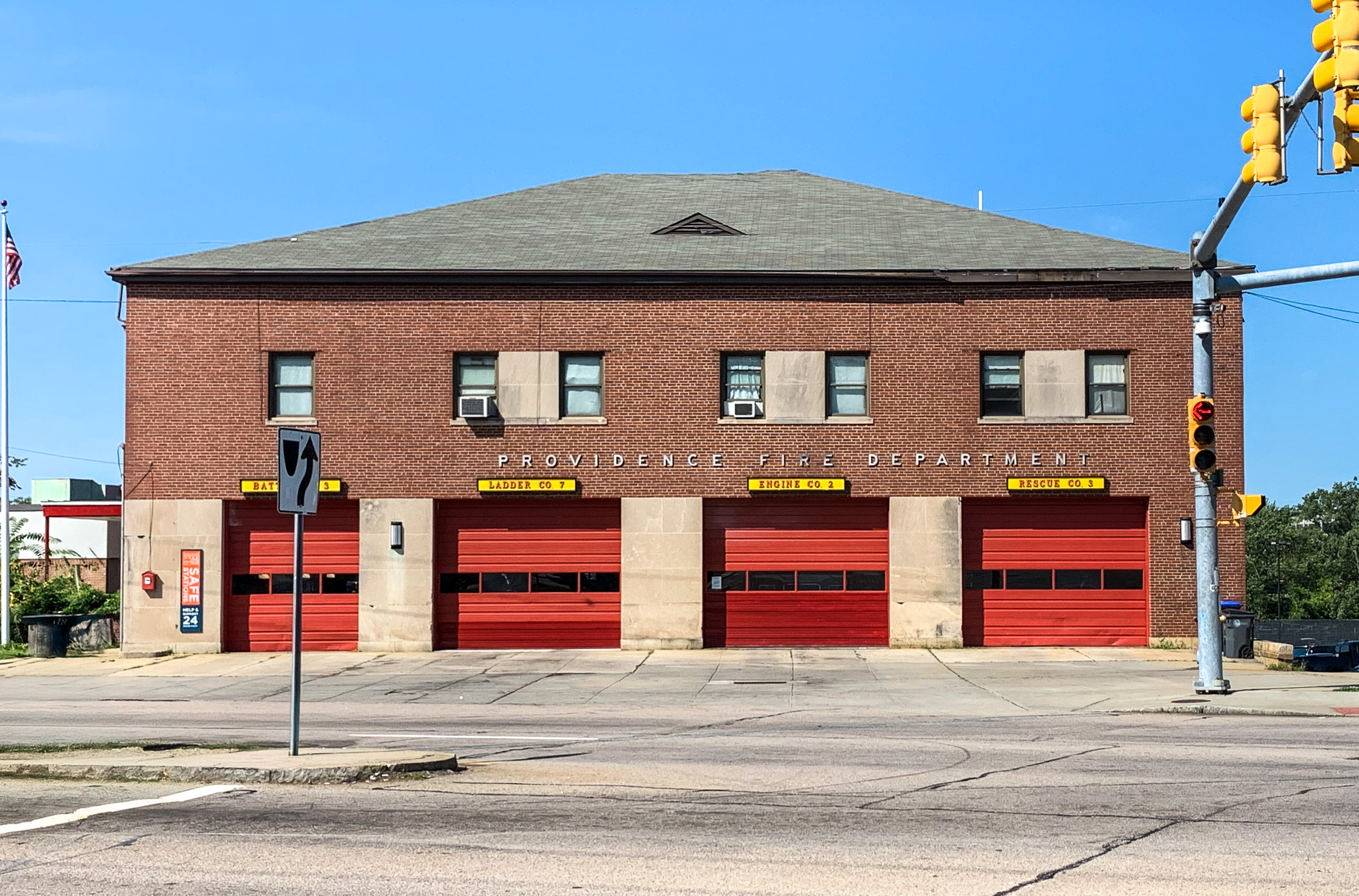
Mount Hope fire station

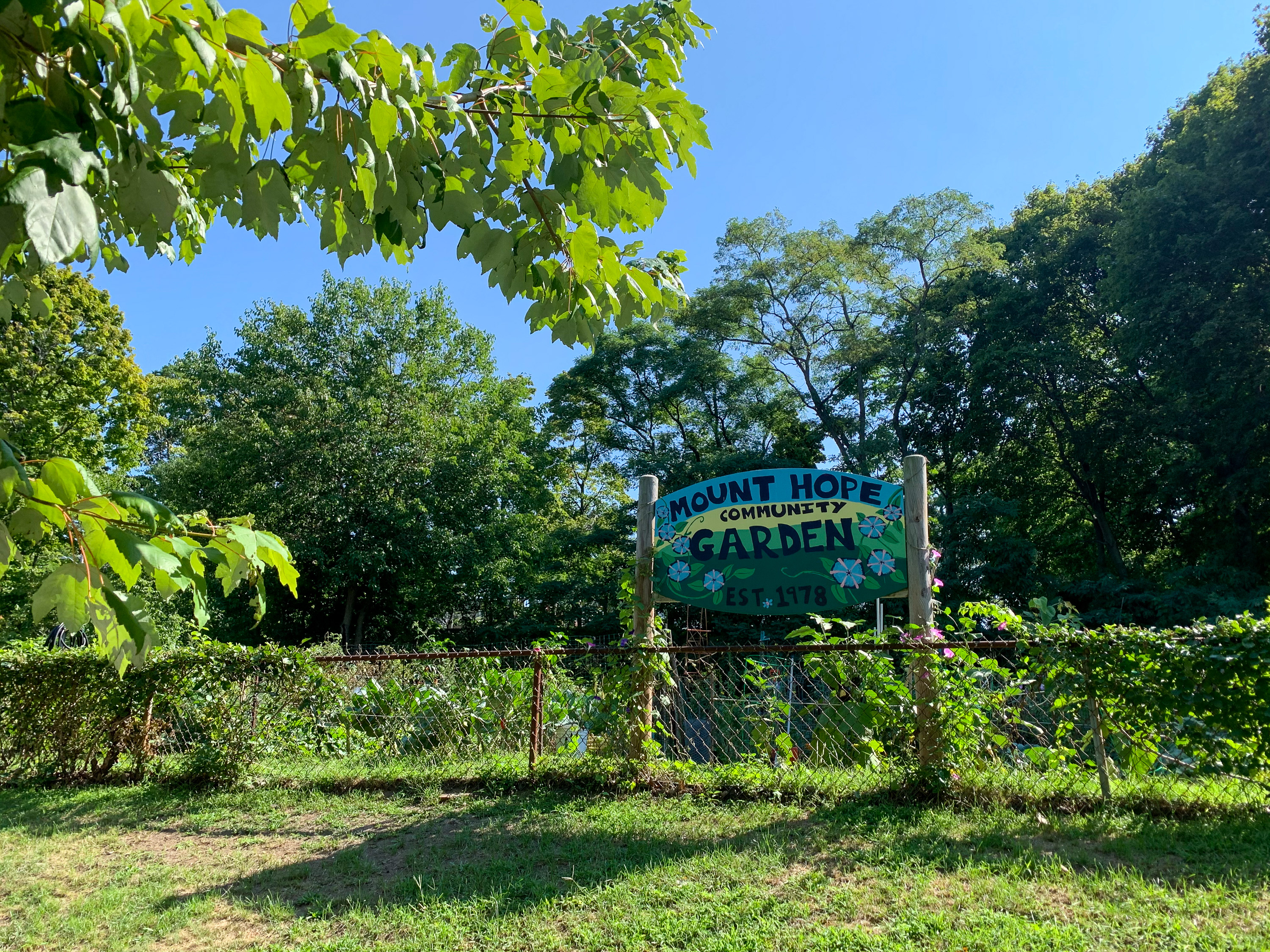
Mount Hope Community Garden
