= Mount Pleasant, Providence, Rhode Island =

Coordinates: 41.837°N 71.454°W

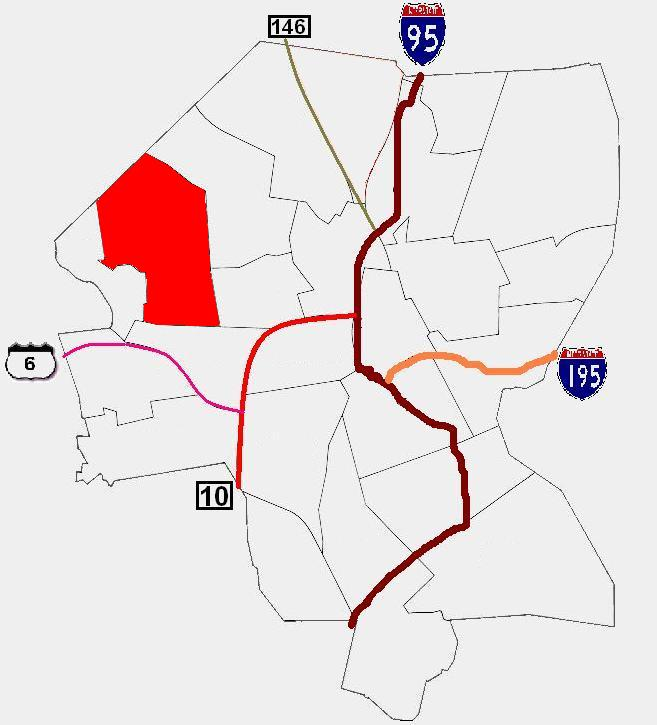
Providence neighborhoods with Mount Pleasant in red

Mount Pleasant is a middle-class residential neighborhood situated in the northwest of the city of Providence, Rhode Island. It is bordered by Olneyville to the south, Valley to the east, Manton to the west, and Elmhurst to the northeast, and the Town of North Providence to the north. The major street boundaries that define Mount Pleasant are Academy Avenue to the east, Smith Street to the northeast, Atwells Avenue to the south, and portions of Bullock, Chalkstone, Mera, and Rushmore Avenues to the west.

Mount Pleasant is one of Providence's most stable neighborhoods. According to the 1990 census, less than half of all Mount Pleasant residents moved into their current residence in the past five years; nearly four out of ten residents had lived in their present unit for more than a decade, and almost one out of five had lived in his or her current home for more than 20 years.

== History ==
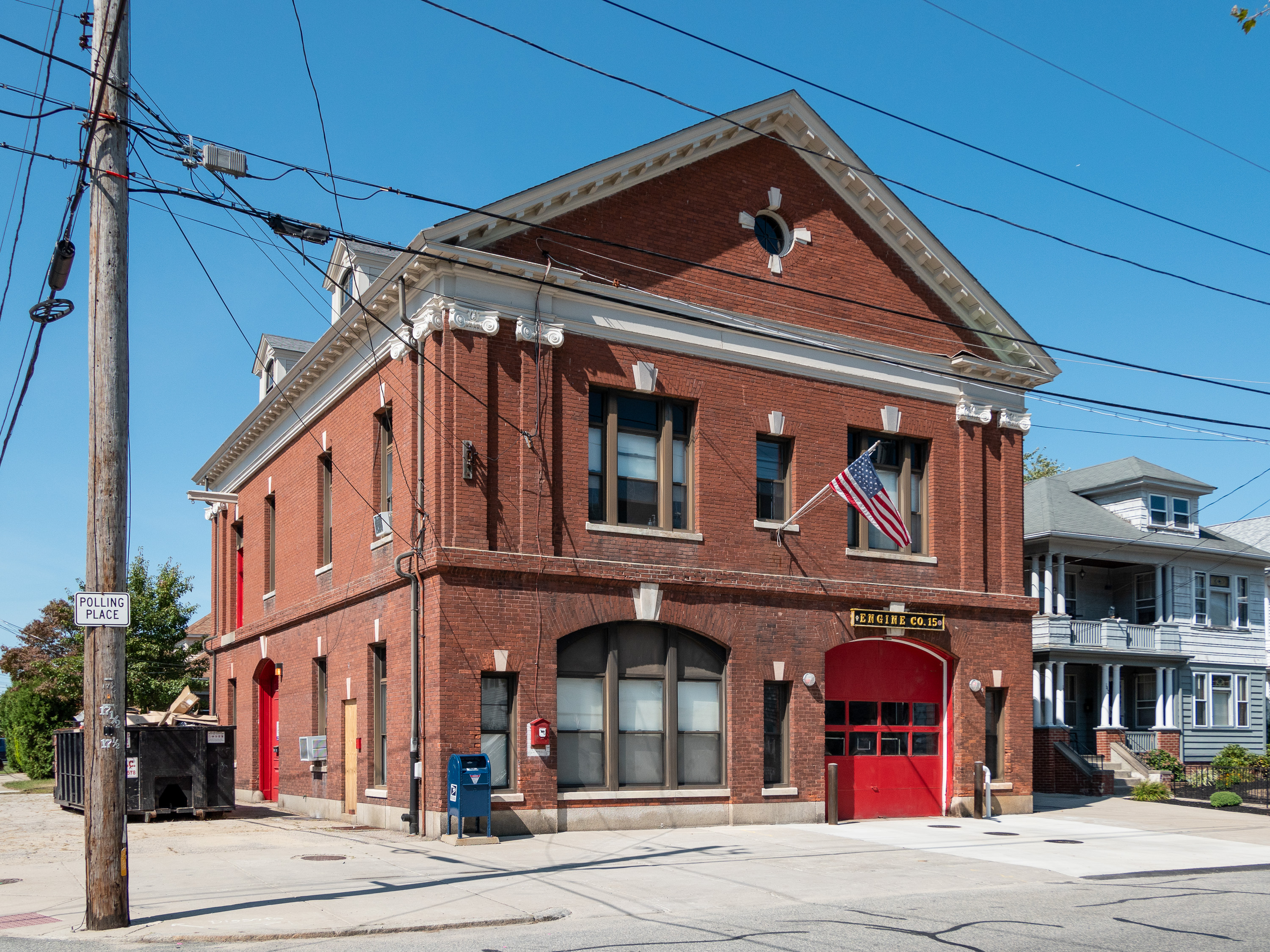
Mount Pleasant Fire Station, on Mount Pleasant Avenue

Mount Pleasant was one of the last sections of the city to be developed, and as a result, most of the houses are of medium size on well landscaped lots and tree-lined streets. Although some houses were constructed in the 19th century, most were built in the early 20th century. The majority of the land area in Mount Pleasant served as farm land through much of the 18th century. By the 1730s, two roads had been established to facilitate produce delivery from the outlying farms to the market downtown. The roads included the northern branch along present-day Douglas Avenue and Eaton Street, and the southern branch along Chalkstone Avenue.

The area of Mount Pleasant remained sparsely populated until around the end of the 19th century. It wasn't until the 1880s when streetcars traversed Chalkstone Avenue that the neighborhood would see a significant number of houses constructed. In the early 1900s, a neighborhood commercial strip formed along Chalkstone Avenue between River Avenue and Mount Pleasant Avenue. That commercial strip remains a thriving part of the neighborhood today, including a full-service grocery store, a bank, service stations, pharmacies, bakeries, tailors, barber shops, meat markets, restaurants, and pubs.

== Landmarks ==
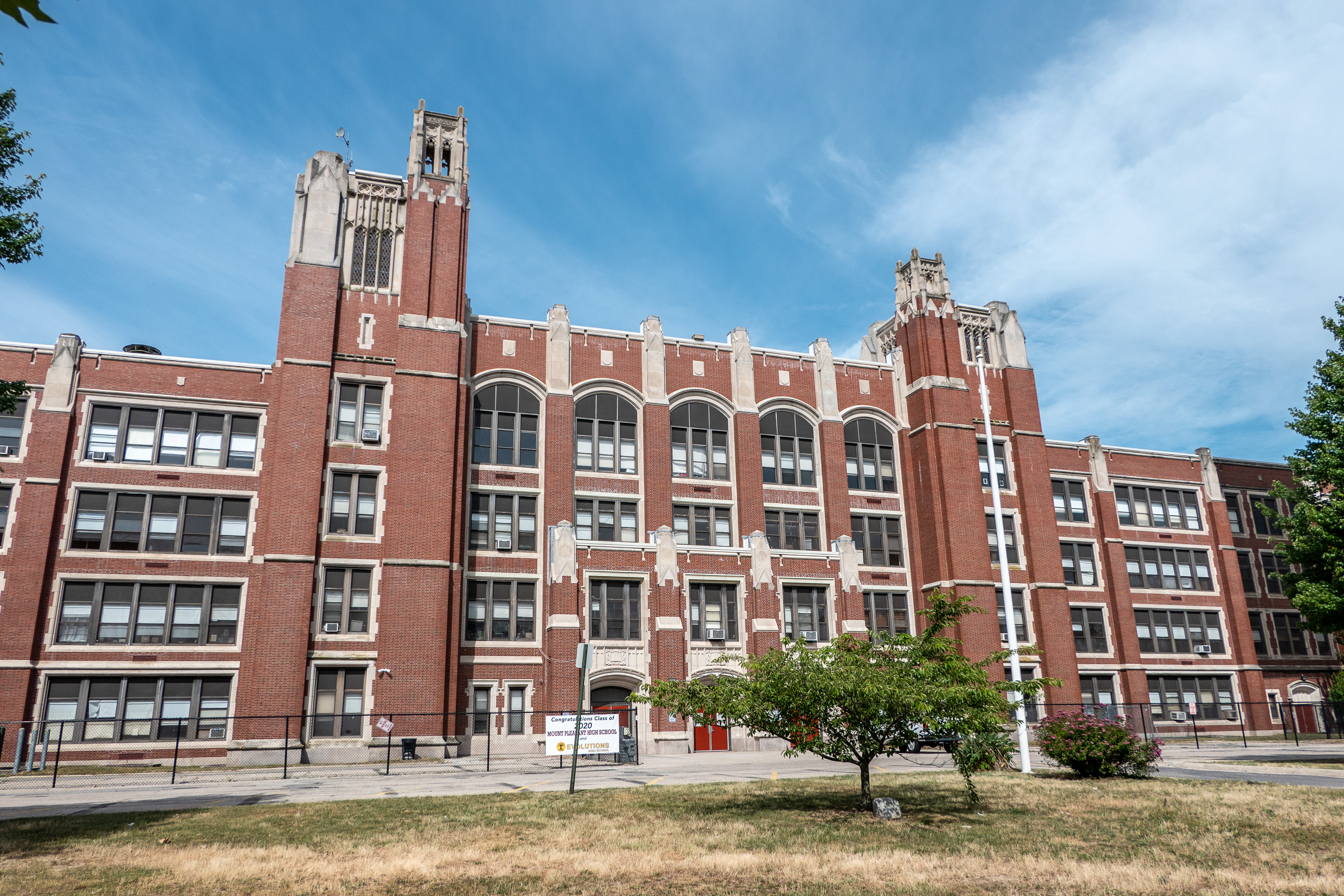
Mount Pleasant High School

Various large educational institutions such as Rhode Island College and Mount Pleasant High School are located in the neighborhood. Along with Triggs Memorial Golf Course, this institutional area is significant in that it provides the neighborhood with substantial open space.

== Demographics ==
By the early 20th century, the Mount Pleasant area was predominantly middle and upper middle-class. The area gradually became more diverse after 1900, as second and third generation Irish-Americans began to move into the area to escape the more congested neighborhoods of Smith Hill and South Providence. By the mid 20th century, second and third-generation Italian-Americans comprised a significant portion of the neighborhood's ethnic composition, many of them having moved to Mount Pleasant from Federal Hill.

The median family income in Mount Pleasant in 1989 was $36,073, 27 percent higher than the citywide median. The incidence of poverty in Mount Pleasant increased slightly in all categories over the past decade, although poverty rates remained well below the citywide figures. In 1990, less than 10 percent of all persons were poor, about 7 percent of families were living below poverty, 16 percent of children were poor, and about 12 percent of the elderly had income below the poverty level.
