= Hartford, Providence, Rhode Island =

Neighborhood in Providence, Rhode Island

Coordinates: 41.82°N 71.46°W

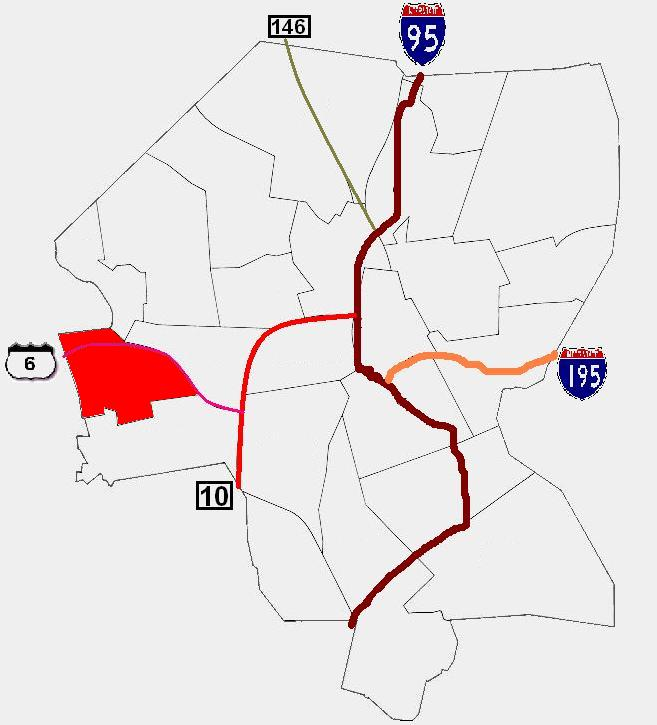
Providence neighborhoods with Hartford in red

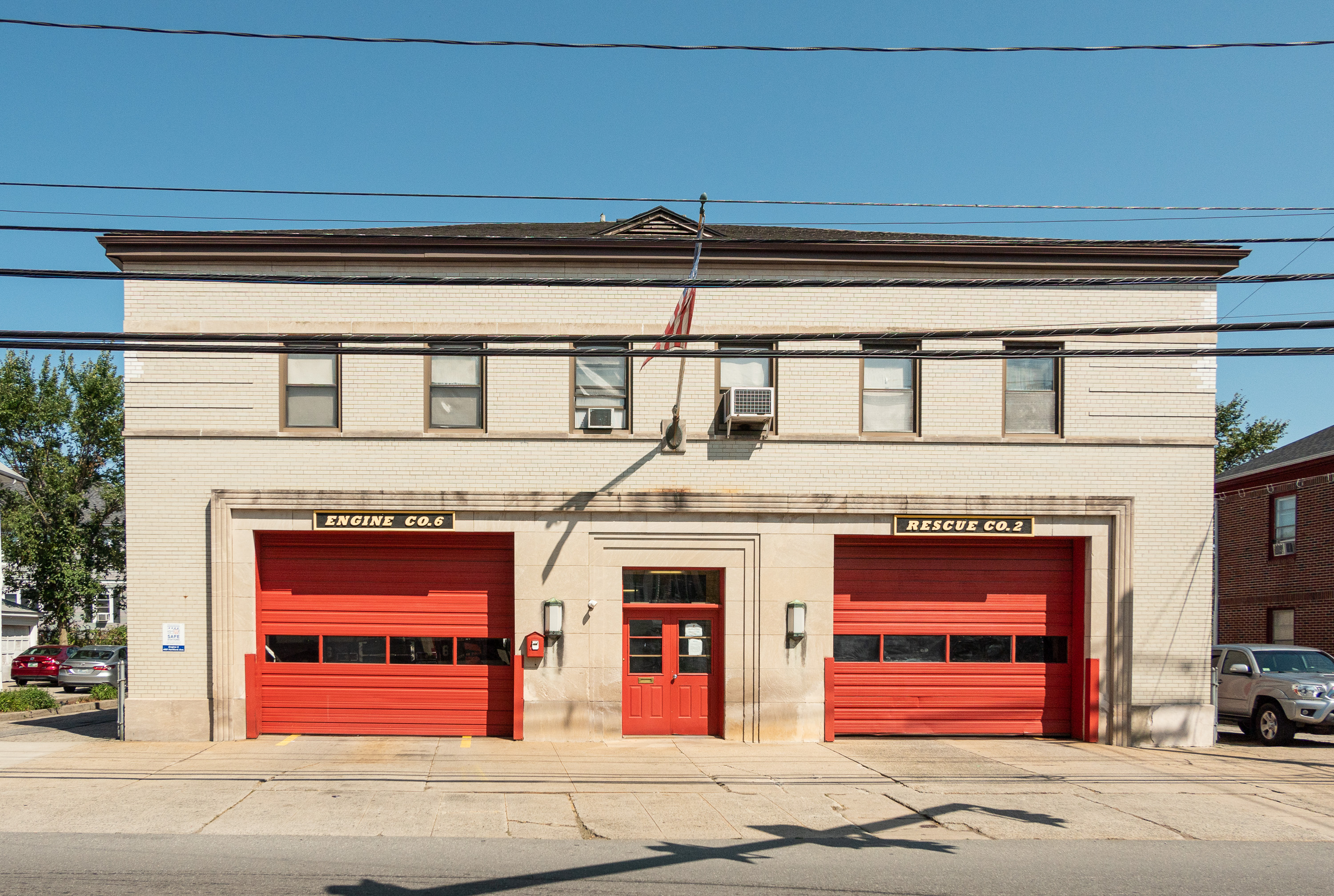
Hartford Avenue Fire Station

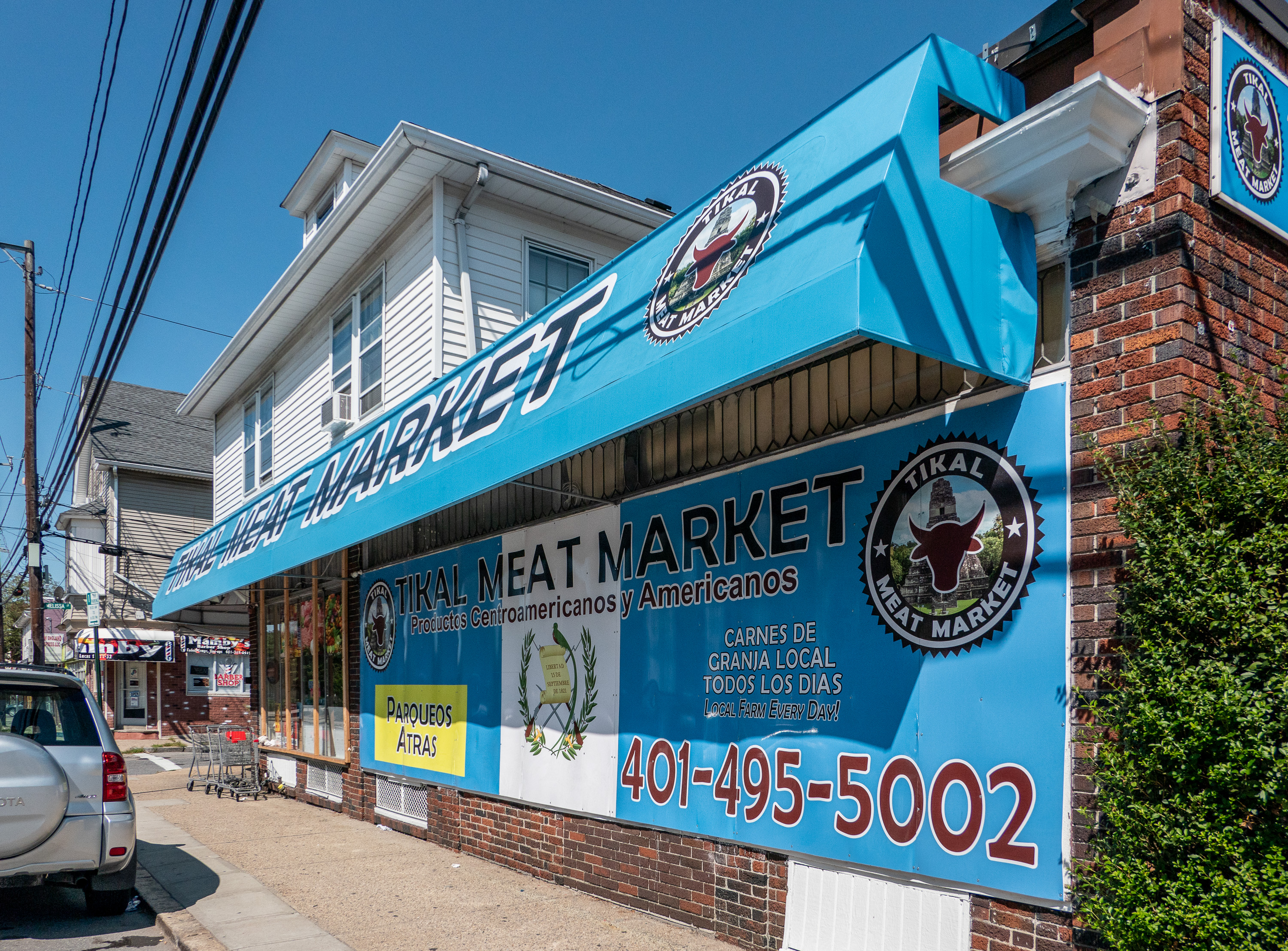
Tikal Meat Market on Hartford Ave offers "Central American and American Products"

Hartford is a neighborhood located along the western edge of Providence, Rhode Island. Route 6 and the Woonasquatucket River separates it from Olneyville.

== History ==
Prior to the arrival of white settlers, the area had been used as a soapstone quarry by the Narragansett natives. The first white settlers were farmers. In the seventeenth and eighteenth centuries, settlers constructed houses that were meant to be temporary residences because they were drawn to the rural setting.

In the early nineteenth century, the proximity of the Woonasquatucket River allowed the area to begin industrialization. In 1812, the Mill Merino became the second textile establishment in the general area, producing a soft material called "merino cloth". Merino Village, consisting of stone houses, a general store, and a water supply, was built by the company to support its workers. As the area began to develop further, its economic opportunities attracted immigrants. Though initially primarily Irish, later waves of immigration brought Polish and later Italian immigrants to the neighborhood.

In the 1950s, massive housing projects altered the fabric of Hartford. The construction of Route 6 meant the demolition of a swath of working-class housing, while two large low-income housing projects (Hartford Park Public Housing Project and Manton Heights Housing Projects) visually demonstrated a shift in the neighborhood's demographics. As with much public housing in the United States, both fell victim to neglect and vandalism, with the demolition of a significant number of units occurring in the 1980s.

== Demographics ==
For census purposes, the Census Bureau classifies Hartford as part of the Census Tract 18. This neighborhood had 6,503 inhabitants based on data from the 2020 United States Census.

The racial makeup of the neighborhood was 11.2% (728) White (Non-Hispanic), 24.8% (1,615) Black (Non-Hispanic), 2.1% (133) Asian, 6.2% (407) from some other race or from two or more races. Hispanic or Latino of any race were 55.7% (3,620) of the population. 38.7% are foreign born, with most foreign born residents originating from Latin America (78%).

The median age in this area is 33.6 years old. Family Households made up 87% of the population, and the average household (family and non-family) had 2.6 persons living there. 35% of the population was married. Out of the 3,051 vacant and non-vacant housing units, 51% were owner occupied, and 49% renter occupied. The average house was worth $274,300, which is significantly less than the average in Providence. 29.3% of residents are below the poverty line.

== Government ==
Hartford is within Ward 7, which is represented in the Providence City Council by Democrat Ana Vargas

== Merino Park ==
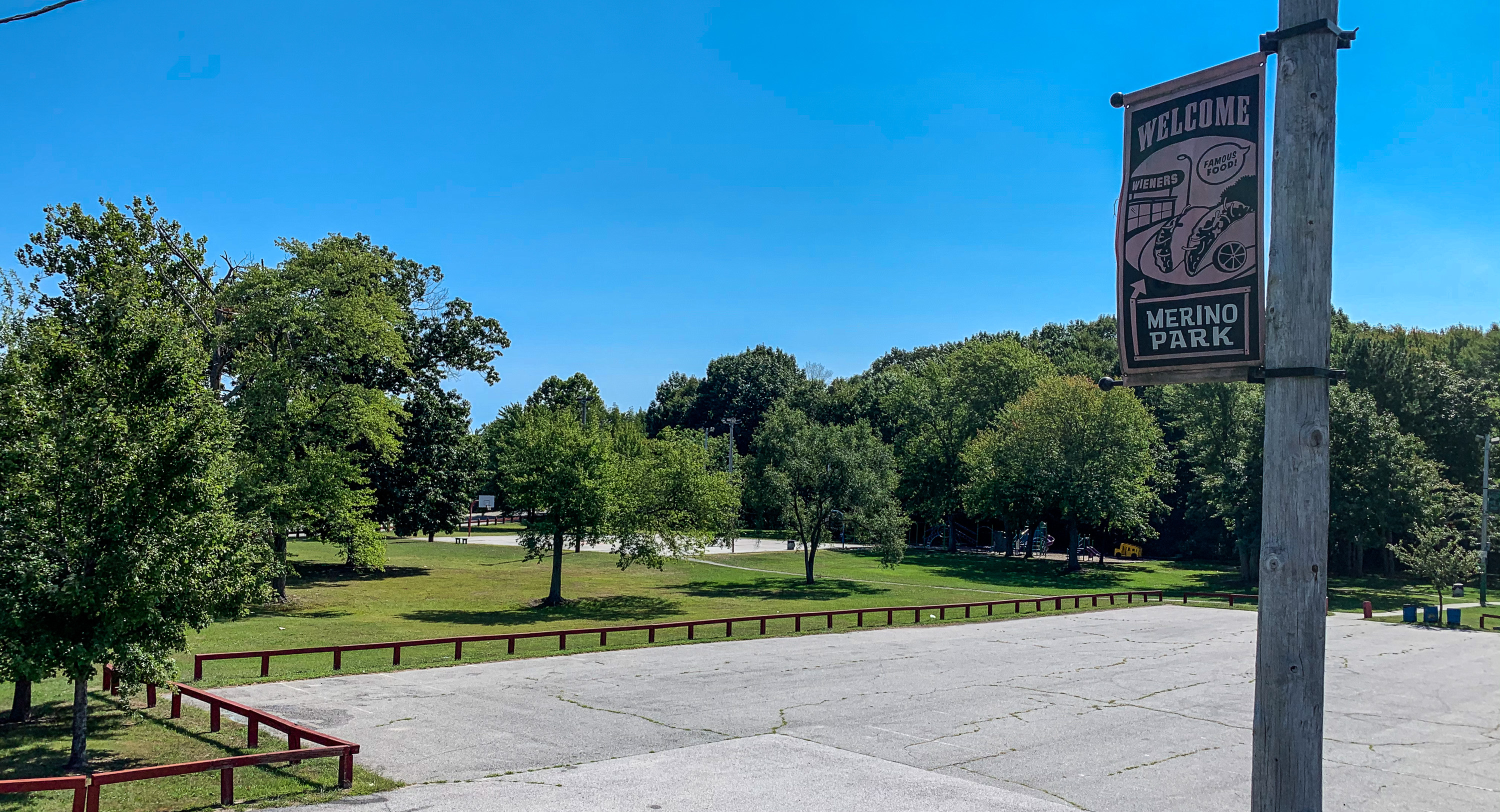
Merino Park

Merino Park is an 18.6-acre (75,000 m^{2}) park on the banks of the Woonasquatucket River Located near the former Merino Mill, the site was previously a sheep farm, a skating pond, a landfill, and a storage site for road salt. In the 1990s, the park was condemned as a "brownfield." By the early 2000s, the site was cleaned up as a public park. The park features a tot lot, picnic areas, lighted basketball courts, and a bicycle path connected to the Woonasquatucket River Greenway. A pedestrian bridge connects Merino Park with the Manton neighborhood.

Located between Hartford Avenue and Route 6, it is the only large public park in Hartford.
