= Reservoir, Providence, Rhode Island =

Neighborhood of Providence, Rhode Island, United States

Coordinates: 41.794°N 71.436°W

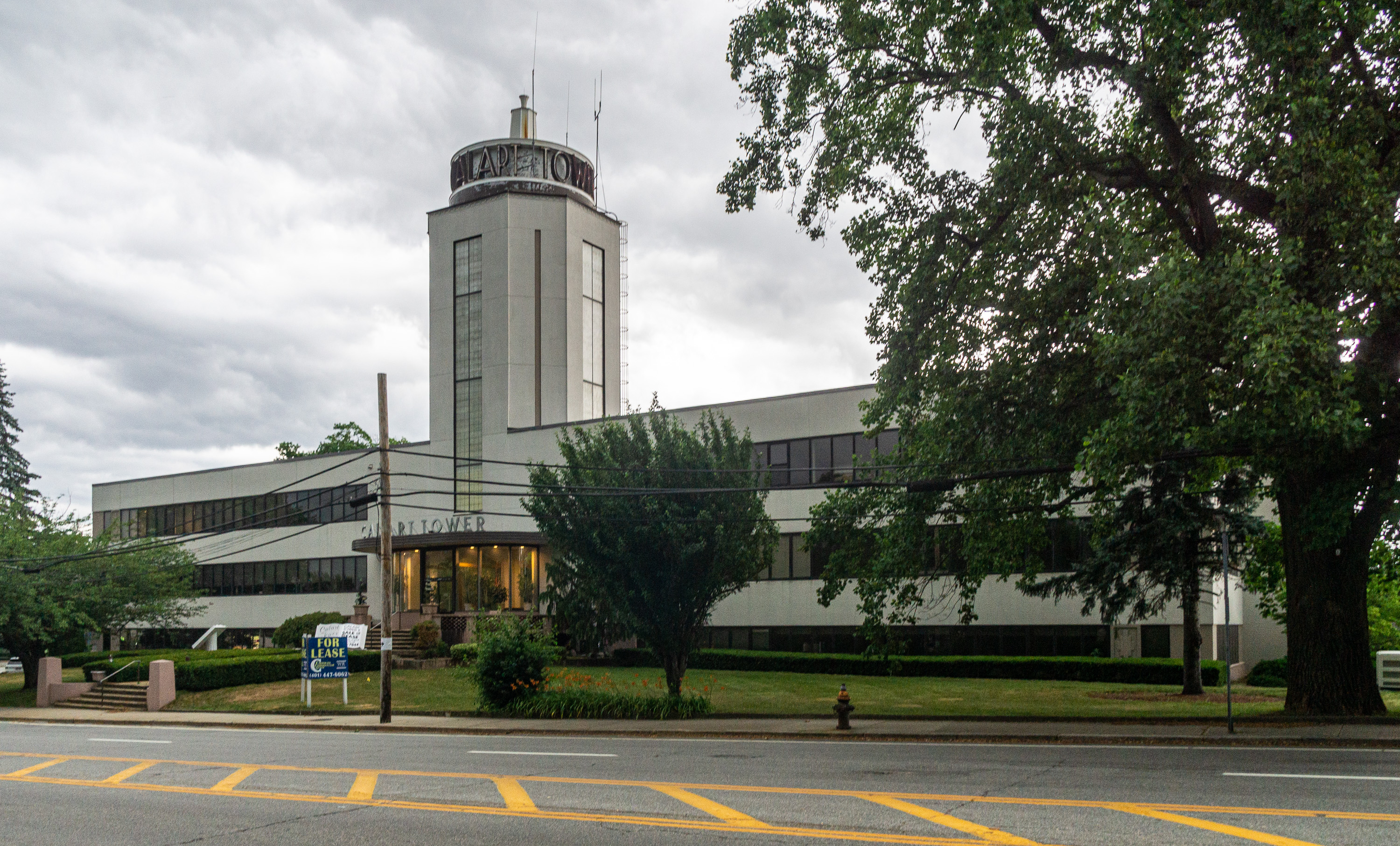
Cal-Art Tower is an art deco building on Reservoir avenue

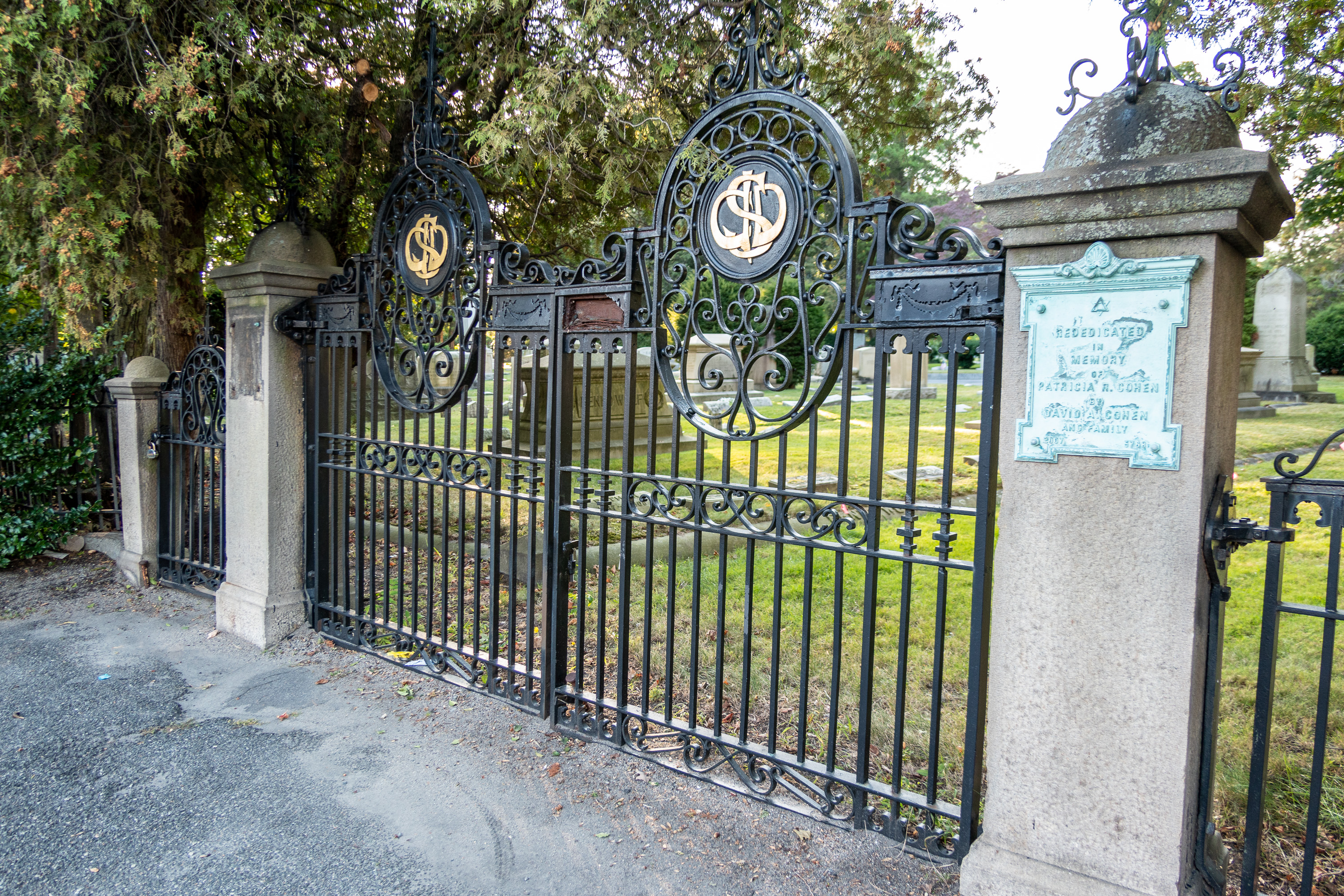
Congregation of the Sons of Israel and David Cemetery

Gorham Manufacturing Company complex, formerly on Adelaide Avenue

Reservoir is a neighborhood in southwest Providence, Rhode Island. It is bounded to the north and east by the Amtrak Northeast Corridor railroad tracks, and to the west and south by the municipal boundary with Cranston. The population of the neighborhood, as of 2000, was 2,963.

Mashapaug Pond lies entirely within the Reservoir neighborhood. The Gorham Manufacturing Company made its home on the pond in the area.

The neighborhood is 40.5% Non-Hispanic White, 15.4% Asian or Pacific Islander, 16.6% African-American, and 22.6% Hispanic. The median household income is $39,769, and the median family income is $41,202. 10.4% of families live below the poverty line.

== Government ==
At the municipal level, all of Reservoir is within Ward 8. James Taylor, a Democrat, represents Ward 8 in the Providence City Council. He was first elected in 2017.
