= Neutaconkanut Hill =

Hill on the Providence–Johnston line in Rhode Island

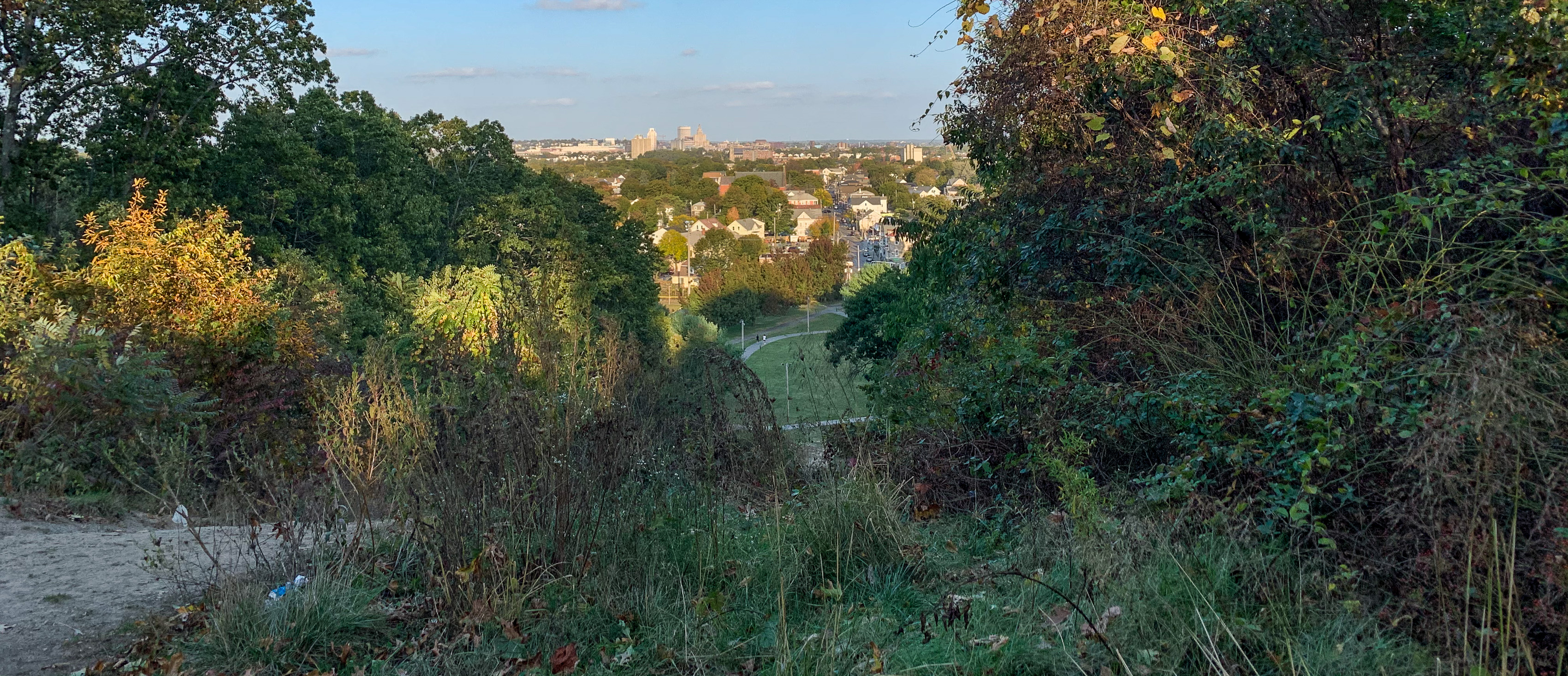
- Downtown Providence seen from Neutaconkanut Hill

Highest point
- Elevation: 296 ft (90 m)
- Coordinates: 41°48′18″N 71°28′21″W

Geography
- Location: Providence and Johnston, Rhode Island, U.S.
- Neutaconkanut Hill Park Historic District
- U.S. National Register of Historic Places
- U.S. Historic district
- Location: 675 Plainfield Street, Providence
- Area: 85 acres (34 ha) (Note: The final National Register nomination and the state's announcement of the listing give the park's area as 85 acres; the park measured 86.9 acres in 1935. The conservancy and Curley give 88 acres.)
- Built: 1903
- Architects: Olmsted Brothers (plan); Works Progress Administration
- NRHP reference No.: 100012682
- Added to NRHP: February 2, 2026

Neutaconkanut Hill (/ˈnuːtəkɒnkənʌt/ NEW-tah-kon-kuh-nut) is a hill on the Providence–Johnston boundary in Rhode Island. The Narragansett have long used the hill as a ceremonial site and still hold Sunrise Ceremonies there. It marked the western boundary of the land on which Roger Williams founded Providence in 1636 and is named in the Sachems' Deed of 1638. Its 296-foot (90 m) summit is just inside Johnston, although the hill is often called the highest point in Providence.

English colonists held land on and around the hill by the 1650s, and the Borden and King families owned the land that became most of the park for more than two centuries. By the late 19th century the hill, though still privately owned, had become a destination for walkers drawn by its views over the city and the bay; among its visitors were Henry David Thoreau and H. P. Lovecraft.

On the hill's eastern and northeastern slopes lies Neutaconkanut Hill Park, an 85-acre (34 ha) public park in Providence's Silver Lake neighborhood. The park was established in 1903, expanded under a 1908 Olmsted Brothers plan, and improved by the Works Progress Administration in the 1930s. After a period of neglect beginning in the 1970s, neighborhood volunteers restored its trails in the 2000s, and in February 2026 the park was added to the National Register of Historic Places as the Neutaconkanut Hill Park Historic District, which shares its boundaries.

== Name and pronunciation ==
The name first appears in the 1638 deed, known variously as the Sachems' Deed and the Towne Evidence, which confirmed the 1636 agreement between Roger Williams and the Narragansett sachems Canonicus and Miantonomi. The deed set Neutaconkanut Hill as one of the boundaries of the new settlement of Providence. The handwritten damaged original gives the name as "Notquonckanet", while the copies entered in the town records in 1658/59 and 1662 give "Neotaconkonitt" and "Neotaconckonett".

R. A. Douglas-Lithgow's 1909 dictionary of New England Native place names listed sixty spelling variants from the early records of Providence. The U.S. Board on Geographic Names adopted Neutaconkanut Hill as the official spelling in 1930.

Douglas-Lithgow wrote that he did not know the word's meaning, but other writers have offered two proposals. The first, "at the short or scant bound", was proposed in 1897 by the ethnologist William Wallace Tooker, who linked the name to the "short bounds" Roger Williams described in a letter of 1669. In 1904 the antiquarian Sidney S. Rider called this meaning "ridiculous", arguing that the name had nothing to do with the short bounds, which were set after the 1638 deed already named the hill. (Note: The "short bound" meaning is repeated, without explanation, in John C. Huden's Indian Place Names of New England (1962) and in Frank Waabu O'Brien's Understanding Indian Place Names in Southern New England (2009).) The second, "the home of the squirrels", appears as early as 1893, without a source, in Mariana M. Tallman's guidebook Pleasant Places in Rhode Island, and recurs in newspaper stories from 1980, 2008, and 2026. The 2025 National Register nomination records both.

Pronunciation also varies. Some speakers say NEW-tah-kon-kuh-nut, which a 2024 Providence Journal pronunciation guide described as "probably correct", while many others, including people who grew up nearby, say NEW-tah-kon-uh-kit or NEW-tah-kon-uh-kut, or simply "Neut".

== Geography ==
Neutaconkanut Hill Park and Historic District (green) occupy the eastern slopes in Providence; the summit (marker) is in Johnston. Park outline from OpenStreetMap.

Neutaconkanut Hill forms the southern end of a ridge extending from the Snake Den hills in northwestern Johnston. The ridge separates the valleys of the Woonasquatucket and Pocasset rivers. The Woonasquatucket forms much of Johnston's eastern boundary, while the Pocasset flows around the hill's southern base.

Near Hartford Avenue, at its northern end, the ridge is relatively flat, at about 180 to 200 feet (55 to 61 m). The hill rises steeply on most sides to a summit 296 feet (90 m) above sea level. The summit lies in Johnston, just west of Neutaconkanut Hill Park in Providence. Privately owned radio and television towers stand on the summit, in the woods west of the park. High points on the east slope give views of downtown Providence to the northeast and, on clear days, into Massachusetts.

The hill lay within Providence until 1759, when Johnston was set off as a separate town and the whole hill became part of it. While the hill lay wholly in Johnston, Providence's highest ground was Tin Top Hill, a 200-foot (61 m) rise on the East Side near the Ladd Observatory. An annexation in 1898 returned much of the hill's east slope to Providence but left the summit in Johnston. From then on, Providence's highest point lay on the east slope, at about 255 feet (78 m) above sea level, below the summit.

Neutaconkanut Hill Park extends from Plainfield Street, a colonial-era road, up the east and northeast slopes to an elevation of roughly 250 feet (76 m), about 500 feet (150 m) north of the Cranston line. The park is bounded by residential streets on the north and east and by the Johnston line on the west and south. A city-owned parcel to the northwest of the park contains the 5.5-acre (2.2 ha) Neutaconkanut Reservoir, built in 1928, and its pumping facilities. The historic district and the park have identical boundaries. Neither includes the summit, the reservoir parcel, or the 14-acre (5.7 ha) tract in Johnston, west of the park, that the Metropolitan Park Commission acquired in 1917.

The upland is covered by second-growth woods dominated by oak, beech, and birch, with ledges, ravines, rock outcrops, a spring, a brook, and a small pond. In October 1924 the botanist J. Franklin Collins collected purpletop grass (Tridens flavus) on the hill's slope, apparently the first record of the species in Rhode Island; he judged from the site that it was native rather than introduced. Wildlife includes deer, foxes, wild turkeys, opossums, skunks, and pheasants.

=== Geology ===
The hornblende erratic on the south slope, blasted apart in 1954

Jackson's engraving, 1840

1910

c. 1920–1930

In his 1839 geological survey of Rhode Island, Charles T. Jackson described Neutaconkanut Hill as consisting of contorted beds of mica slate and hornblende slate. He also noted a large hornblende boulder resting on the hill's south slope and concluded that it had been carried there by glacial action from a source north of the hill. In 1910 David W. Hoyt described it as a pre-glacial hill "with a ledge for a backbone", smoothed and scratched by the ice sheet. In October 1924 the New England Intercollegiate Geologic Excursion visited the hill to examine the contact between older sedimentary rocks and the Milford granite.

The boulder described by Jackson was a glacial erratic weighing about 350 tons. Boys who played around it called it "Football Rock"; older residents knew it as "Balanced Rock". In 1909 Douglas-Lithgow called it the Canonicus Boulder, and local tradition held that the sachem Canonicus had used it as a lookout. After Hurricane Carol toppled the oak tree that helped support it in 1954, the boulder was blasted apart by its owner, the Providence Journal Company. Alonzo W. Quinn of Brown University's geology department examined a fragment and confirmed Jackson's conclusion that the boulder had been carried from somewhere to the north.

The boulder's remains still lie on the south slope, just outside the park boundary in Johnston, where they are marked on conservancy trail maps as the Exploded Canonicus Boulder.

== The park today ==
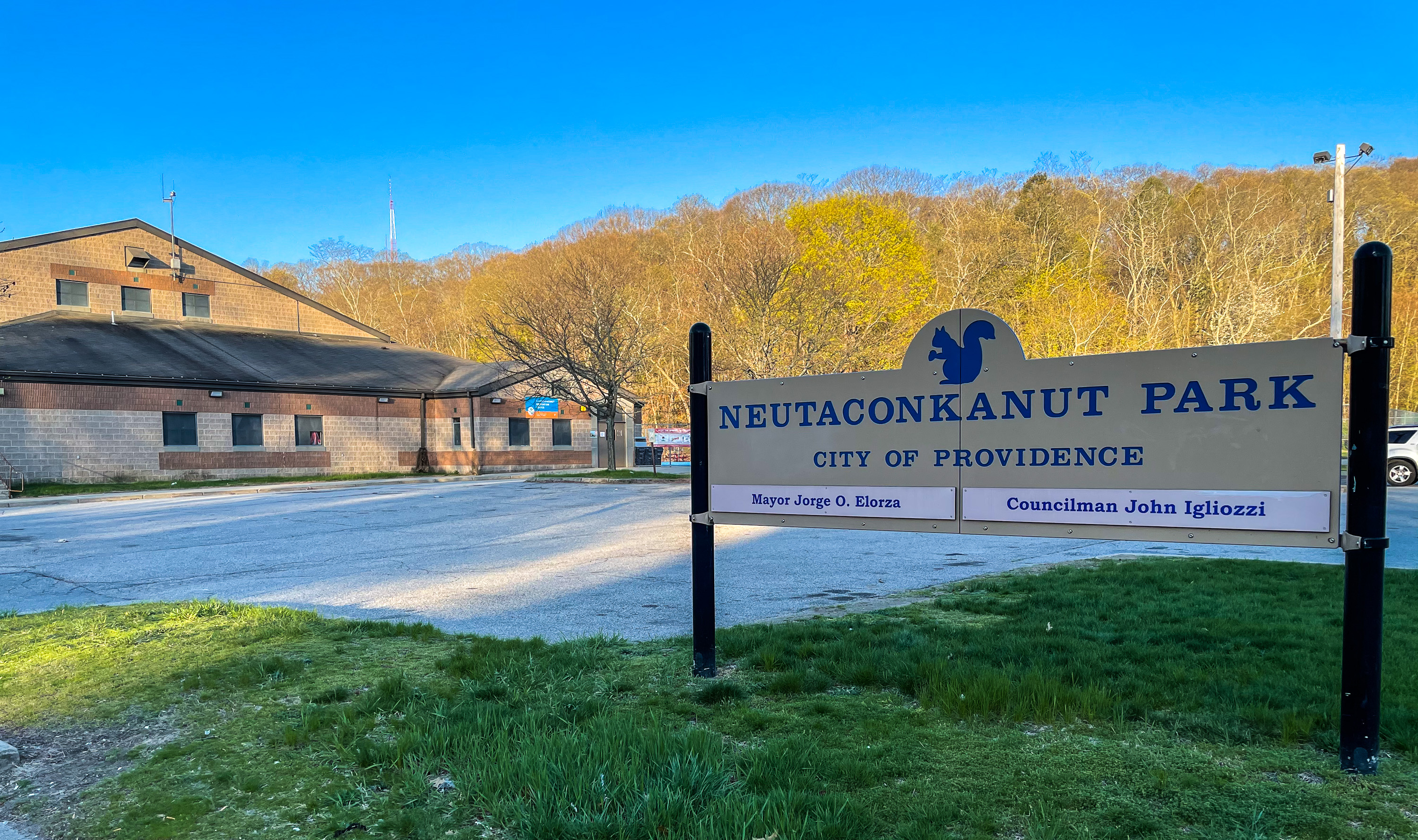
The park sign and a park building at the foot of the hill

The level ground at the foot of the hill along Plainfield and Killingly Streets has two baseball fields, a swimming pool, a recreation center, a skate park, playground equipment, basketball courts, and a splash pad.

The wooded upland is kept for walking. The longest route, the 1.5-mile (2.4 km) Pinnacle Trail, climbs from the Plainfield Street entrance past a boardwalk overlook to a hilltop meadow with views of downtown Providence. The Neutaconkanut Hill Conservancy, a volunteer nonprofit, maintains approximately 2.5 miles (4.0 km) of hiking trails (Note: The National Register nomination lists seven marked trails, the longest being the 1.5-mile (2.4 km) Pinnacle Trail and the 1.35-mile (2.17 km) Pond Trail.) and its volunteers have rebuilt many of the older paths. With guidance from the Appalachian Mountain Club, volunteers have also constructed boardwalks over wetlands and bridges connecting trails. The conservancy hosts guided walks on the first Saturday of each month.

In winter the hillside is a popular, if hazardous, sledding spot. The trail network is also used for snowshoeing and cross-country skiing.

Neutaconkanut Hill is one of the entries in Robert Curley's guidebook 100 Things to Do in Rhode Island Before You Die.

== History ==
=== Narragansett history and significance ===
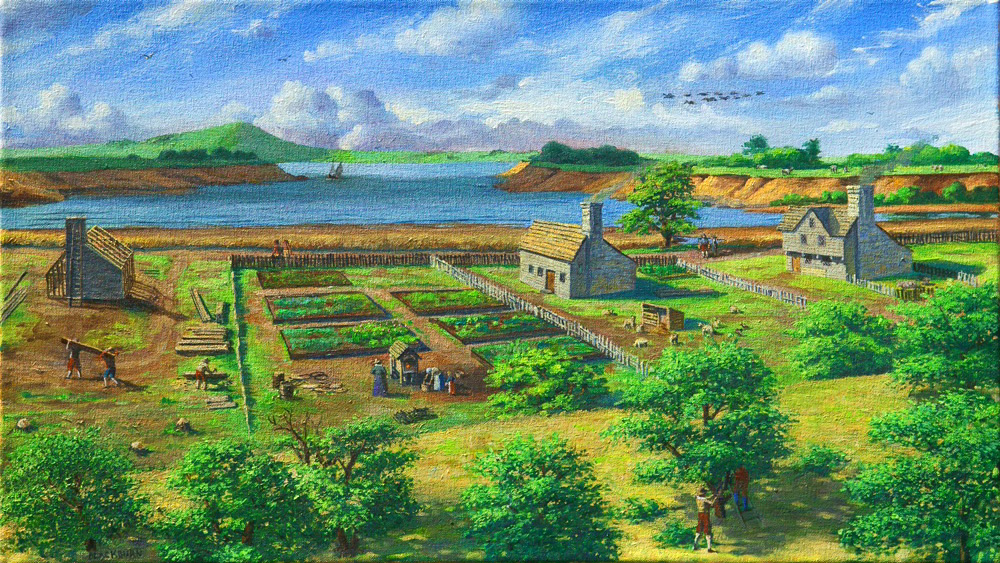
Providence about 1650, looking west across the Great Salt Cove from what is now College Hill, in a modern painting by Jean Blackburn; Neutaconkanut Hill is the large hill at upper left

For Native people, the hill commanded a view over the fertile lands around the Great Salt Cove, Mashapaug Pond, and the rivers at the head of Narragansett Bay. Portions of the hill in both Providence and Johnston are recorded as archaeological site RI-690. No systematic excavation has been carried out, but state site files note standing stones, stone rows, and small caves suggestive of precolonial habitation, and local children have long reported finding arrowheads. An 1898 Providence Journal feature reported that every field cleared on the hill had yielded arrowheads and other stone tools.

Hipses Rock, the western boundary marker of the new town of Providence. Photo 1904.

Other Native material comes from the hill and from the ridge to its north. Howard M. Chapin of the Rhode Island Historical Society described a small human figure, about 3.5 inches (8.9 cm) tall and carved from graphite, said to have been found on the hill; it belonged to the collection of Samuel W. King, whose family owned land there. Farther north along the ridge, off Hartford Avenue in Johnston, is a Narragansett soapstone (steatite) quarry where stone pots, dishes, and pipes were made before European contact. Rediscovered in 1878, the precolonial quarry was later largely destroyed by the construction of an industrial building and parking lot.

The Narragansett regard the hill as an historical ceremonial site. Lorén Spears, executive director of the Tomaquag Indian Memorial Museum, has said the area likely held stone features of a ceremonial landscape, such as cairns or council rocks, that have since been disturbed. From 1931 to 1933, and again in 1935, the National Algonquin Indian Council held annual powwows near Hipses Rock, on land then owned by Frank W. Tillinghast. The gatherings brought together Narragansett and Wampanoag participants from across southern New England, among them the Narragansett leader Philip H. Peckham (Sachem Night Hawk). Narragansett tribal member Sherenté Harris has described high places like the hill as especially sacred, noting that tribal members continue to hold Sunrise Ceremonies there.

=== 1636 Providence boundary ===
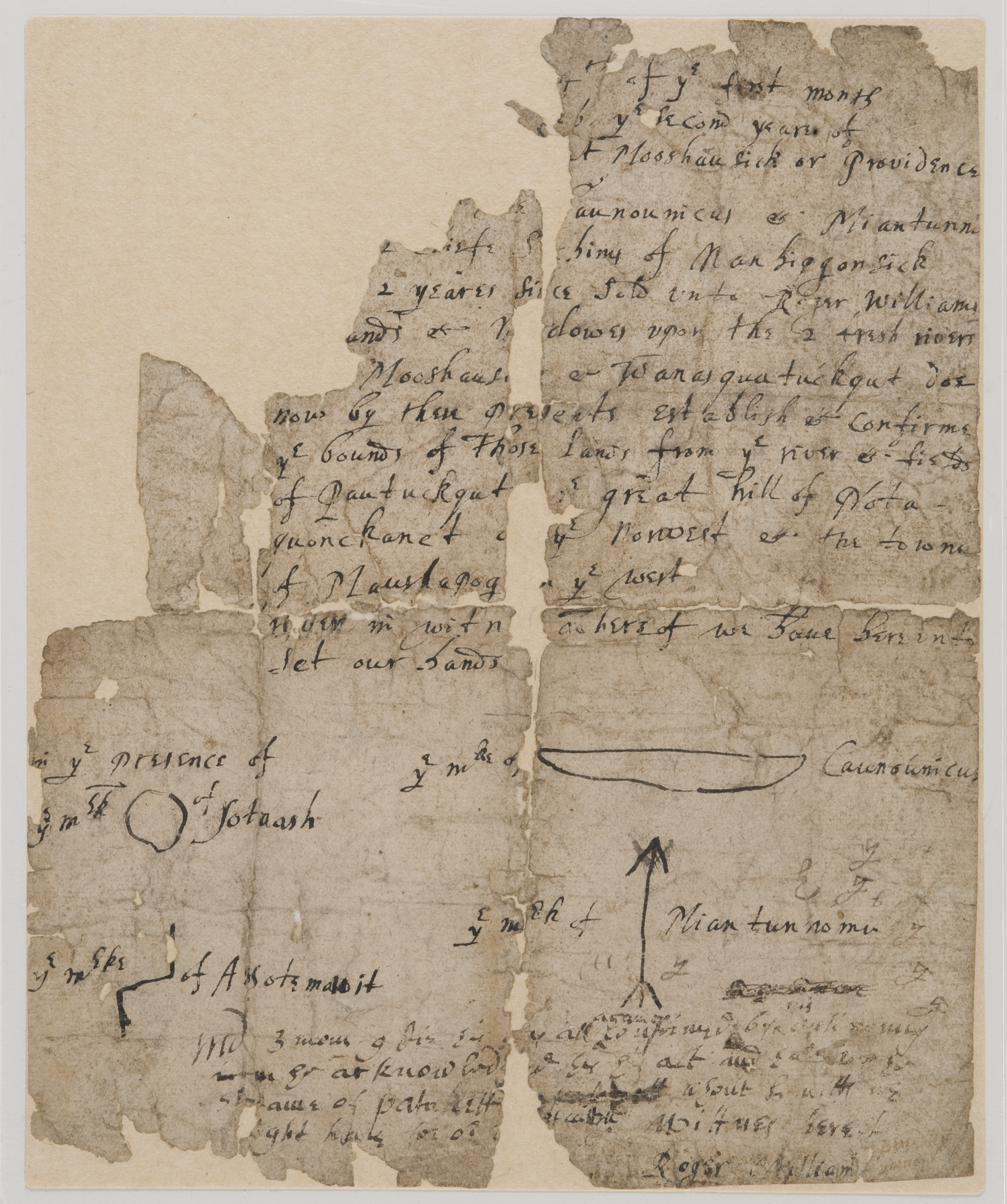
The original deed to the Providence lands

In 1636 the Narragansett sachems Canonicus and Miantonomi allowed Roger Williams to settle at Providence. Their written land confirmation, dated March 24, 1637/38, (Note: The deed is dated the 24th of "the first month, commonly called March". Under the Old Style calendar then in use, the year began on March 25, so the date is given as 1637 in older sources and 1638 in modern reckoning.) fixed the bounds of the grant at the river and fields at Pawtucket, "the great hill of Notquonckanet" on the northwest, and the town of Mashapaug on the west. The resulting line ran from just above Pawtucket Falls southwest to Neutaconkanut Hill, then southeast to the mouth of the Pawtuxet River. The two legs, about 7 miles (11 km) from Pawtucket to the hill and 6 miles (9.7 km) from the hill to Pawtuxet, formed the western sides of a roughly triangular grant.

Narragansett oral histories describe the sachems standing on the hill and spreading their arms to show Williams the limits of the grant. In the Narragansett view, the arrangement granted usufruct rights to use the land rather than selling it outright. The deed's wording was imprecise, and its limits were soon contested by settlers. In testimony given in lawsuits over the bounds, witnesses offered conflicting interpretations. The line was later fixed by a series of landmarks ending at Hipses Rock, a prominent boulder about 20 feet (6.1 m) high in an open tract near the western foot of the hill, roughly 0.4 miles (0.64 km) west of the summit. The town also paid other Native holders of rights at the hill: the treasurer Hugh Bewitt's account for the term ending in June 1652 records a payment of one pound five shillings "to Owcapocamine the Sachem of Cowessitte for his and all Jndians righte of Lands at Newteconcanitt". (Note: Cowessitte is Cowesett, now part of Warwick; see Cowesett.)

=== Farms and early English settlement ===
The earliest recorded English land transaction at the hill dates from 1654, when Arthur Fenner and Henry Brown acquired meadow and upland at "Newdaconkonett" beside the Pocasset River. Fenner later built up a 218-acre farm south and west of the hill. His first house there, said to have been built in 1662, was burned during King Philip's War; the house built in its place became known as "Fenner Castle".

Another early landowner was the Borden family, which acquired property on and around the hill beginning in 1659. Much of the present park occupies land held by Bordens during the 18th and 19th centuries. A small farmhouse was built there in the early 1700s. A 1779 tax record shows William Borden growing half an acre of "Neutaconkanut Hill Tobacco", a crop uncommon in the area. Family members were buried in a small cemetery on the hillside that survives today.

After the Borden property was divided in the 1820s, part passed to the King family, descendants of the original Bordens. In 1882 Henry Clay King and William Borden King began cultivating grapes there, and in 1906 Abbie Allen King erected a granite monument to the family on the hillside.

Although the land was still private, guidebooks and The Providence Journal recommended walks to the hill between 1888 and 1901. An 1890 Journal piece called it "a romantic looking eminence" from which, on a clear day, Fall River could be seen. In 1898 Providence re-annexed part of Johnston, including much of the hill's eastern slope, bringing a portion of the future park within the city limits.

=== Establishment of the park ===
In 1891, John E. Bowen proposed Neutaconkanut Hill as a public park at a meeting of the Public Parks Association of Providence, calling it "a natural park more perfect than the hand of man could devise". Supporters pointed out that streetcars ran to the hill and that Olneyville's roughly 7,000 mill workers could rarely afford the time or fare to reach Roger Williams Park. After a decade of advocacy, Providence purchased the first 31.55 acres (12.77 ha) of parkland in October 1903 and dedicated Neutaconkanut Hill Park the following month.

Hundreds attended the park's first concert in 1904, and a bandstand and the winding Circle Road were completed in 1906. In a 1908 report for the Metropolitan Park Commission, Percy R. Jones of the landscape architecture firm Olmsted Brothers urged the city to keep the hill's natural features and to buy land with views from the summit, flat land for a playground, and frontage on Plainfield Street. That plan guided the park's growth for nearly fifty years.

Around 1910 the city added a baseball diamond, a cricket field, and a children's play area. Hikers and picnickers used an adjacent state-owned tract in Johnston, acquired in 1917, as an extension of the park.

The King Memorial Observatory shortly before it burned in 1925

Abbie Allen King, the last of the family to live at the homestead, at first refused to sell; in 1908 she vowed that the city "will never get a foot of it". In 1912 she sold the city a 7-acre lot that let the park expand south, but she kept the homestead and the King Memorial Observatory, a concrete tower she had built on the crest. Vandals defaced the tower, and an arson fire gutted it on April 29, 1925. The nearby Borden and King homestead buildings survived until 1955, when the city demolished them after years of vandalism and brush fires.

In the 1910s and 1920s the park drew hundreds of visitors a day, and thousands for school field days, Fourth of July celebrations, and major sporting events. It was the city's second-largest park, after Roger Williams Park. Providence's first municipal bowling green opened there in 1929 and soon also hosted games of bocce.

=== Depression-era improvements ===
During the Great Depression, Providence paid for park work first through its own relief program (1931–1933), then through the federal Civil Works Administration and, from 1935, the Works Progress Administration (WPA). In 1935 and 1936, WPA crews built a toboggan run, a ski jump, walking paths, and a rain shelter, and they enlarged the ball field. Several structures still bear plaques reading "Built by Works Progress Administration 1935–1938". The hill's Great Stone Stairs are often attributed to the WPA, although no contemporary record confirms this.

From the 1930s into the 1950s, the park's winter sports facilities, unique among Providence parks, were promoted by the Federal Writers' Project guide to Rhode Island, The New York Times, and Travel magazine. The slopes hosted ski competitions, residents skated on the hill's pond, and The Providence Journal has called the jump the first official ski jump in the state. The tow ropes began breaking down in the 1950s, and it is unclear when skiing there ended.

Among the children who used the park in these years was Eleanor B. "Elli" Panichas, who grew up near the hill and decades later led the effort to restore it. She remembered Sunday afternoon concerts at the hilltop bandstand, a meadow cut with a horse-drawn mower, and skiers launching from the jump.

=== Decline and revival ===
In 1960 the city auctioned off an 8.75-acre (3.54 ha) parcel at the park's northwest corner, most of it land acquired from the Alfred Williams estate, for redevelopment. The sale reduced the park to the boundaries it has today.

By the early 1970s, the hill had fallen into neglect. Dirt-bike riders used the overgrown trails, and stolen cars were stripped and abandoned there. The partially buried remains of two early-1970s Chevrolet Camaros, left in place because they were too deeply buried to remove, remain a curiosity along one of the trails today.

In 1976, Elli Panichas and other residents of Providence and Johnston founded the Neutaconkanut Hill Park Association to restore the park. By 1980, little remained of the former ski tow, and many of the hill's paths had become overgrown, although a Youth Conservation Corps crew had repaired some trail steps and the parks department had begun planning improvements.

The lower park gained a recreation center in 1993, a baseball field concession stand during the 1990s, and a skate park in 2004. Neighbors revived the park association in 2005, and a $50,000 state grant in 2006 paid for the first phase of trail work. The organization became the nonprofit Neutaconkanut Hill Conservancy in 2009. With the city, the Woonasquatucket River Watershed Council, and Providence College's Urban Action program, volunteers rebuilt the trail network and hauled out more than ten abandoned cars and over a hundred dumped tires.

The city expanded the skate park in 2024 and redesigned the playground in 2025, adding accessible play equipment, a shaded picnic area, and new seating.

== Neutaconkanut Hill Park Historic District ==
Ballfield concession at Neutaconkanut Hill Park

Elli Panichas, a founder of the park association and later a member of the Providence Board of Park Commissioners, advocated for listing the park on the National Register of Historic Places as early as the 1970s. She died on November 4, 2025, at age 94, weeks before the nomination came before the state review board. The Rhode Island State Review Board considered the nomination on December 8, 2025, and the district, whose boundary is identical to the park's, was added to the National Register on February 2, 2026.

The nomination described the park as significant at the local level in two areas. In community planning and development, it shows the work of the Public Parks Association, the Metropolitan Park Commission, and the Olmsted Brothers, whose 1908 plan guided the park's growth for nearly fifty years and whose approach, keeping the hill's rugged terrain natural while developing the lowlands for recreation, is still followed. In recreation, its structures show how recreational needs changed in the first half of the 20th century. The period of significance runs from 1903, when the city bought the first parcel, to 1960, when the park reached its present shape.

The nomination focused on the park's planning and recreational history, in part because little archaeological work has been conducted on the hill. Spears criticized the historical narrative as Eurocentric, while the state preservation office said it welcomed future research centered on Narragansett perspectives.

== Literary associations ==
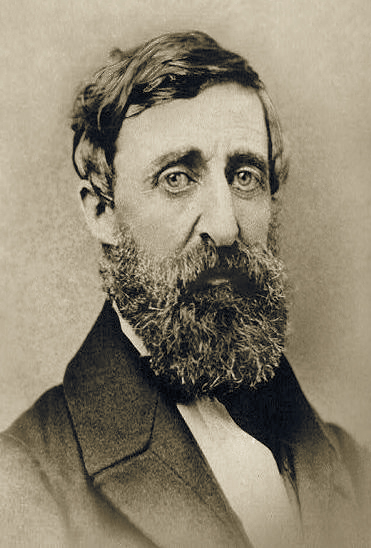
Henry David Thoreau, 1861

The writer and naturalist Henry David Thoreau, author of Walden, made his only visit to Providence in December 1854. He arrived by train on December 6 and that evening lectured at Railroad Hall in the city's Union Station; the talk, advertised as "What Shall It Profit", later became his essay "Life Without Principle". His host and guide during the two-day stay was the Transcendentalist writer Charles King Newcomb. On December 7 Thoreau walked several miles west across the city, through Olneyville, to Neutaconkanut Hill.

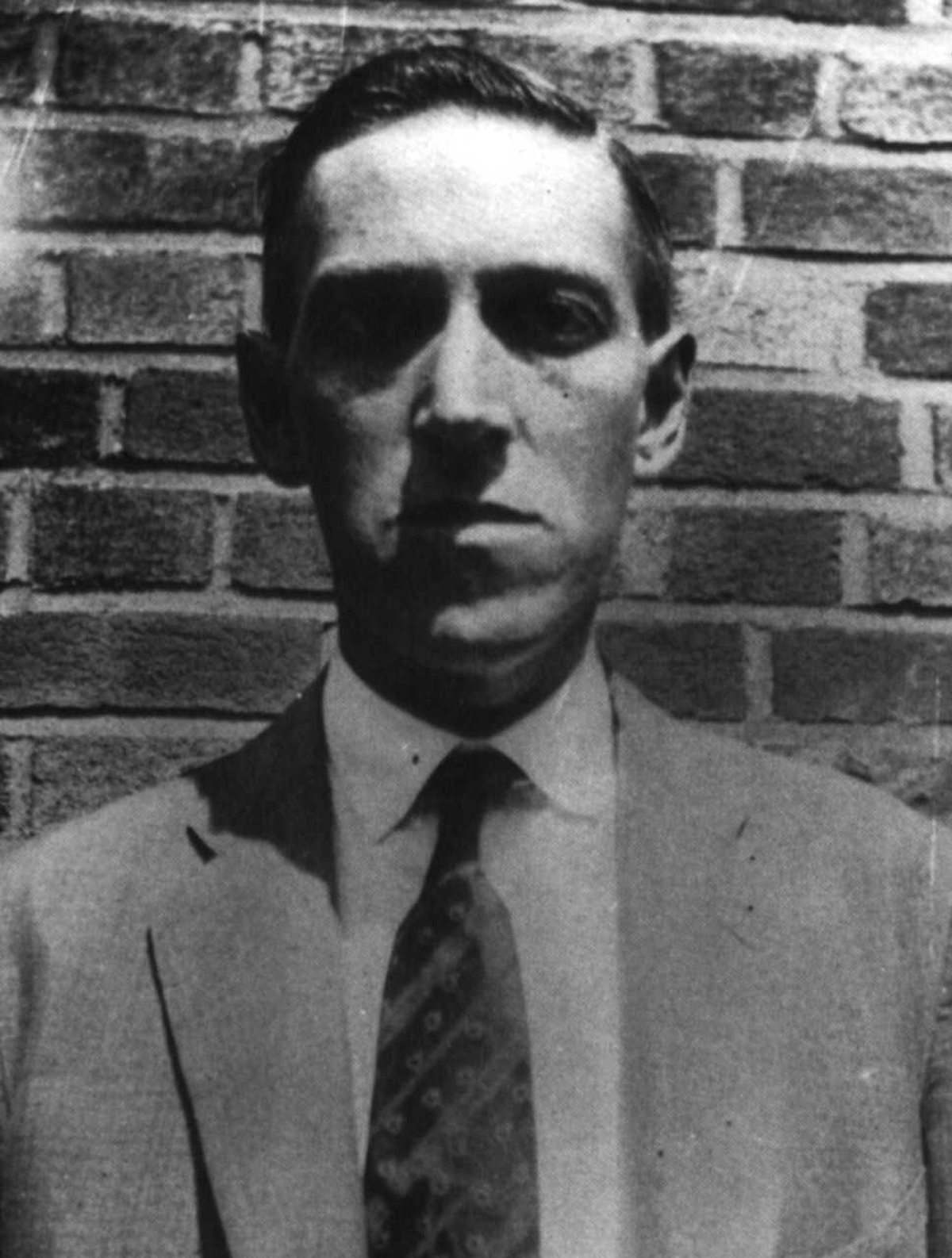
H. P. Lovecraft, 1931

The writer H. P. Lovecraft, who lived on Providence's East Side, climbed the hill with his aunt Annie Gamwell on October 21, 1923. Writing to Frank Belknap Long, he described "the most magnificent view of Providence and environs which either had ever beheld or imagin'd" from its "craggy summit" and noted that "an observatory in the Gothick manner, and somewhat in disrepair, crowns this majestick acclivity".

Lovecraft returned often for the view, but only in the autumn of 1936 did he explore the woods beyond the crest, which he had taken to be a fringe of private farmland. He called the area "almost a new world at my doorstep—a region of great oaks, hidden meadows starred with autumnal flowers, & crumbling remnants of colonial stone walls" and expected to use it in his fiction. On October 18, 1936, in one of his last outings before illness ended his travels, he walked the country west of the hill and climbed it at sunset. He found it "a miniature plateau or table-land, with valleys, ridges, and summits of its own, rather than a simple hill", with the city skyline visible from its meadows and balanced boulders on its rocky heights. The account comes from his last letter, to James F. Morton, found unfinished on his desk after he was taken to the hospital in March 1937. August Derleth later worked the passage into "The Lamp of Alhazred" (1957), a story he published as a posthumous collaboration with Lovecraft, in which the hill appears as "Nentaconhaunt".

== See also ==
- Silver Lake, Providence, Rhode Island
- National Register of Historic Places listings in Providence, Rhode Island
