= FringePVD =

Annual arts festival in Rhode Island, United States

- Status: active
- Genre: fringe festival
- Frequency: Annually
- Locations: Olneyville, Providence, Rhode Island; Valley, Providence, Rhode Island
- Website: fringepvd.org

FringePVD is a fringe arts and theater festival in Providence, Rhode Island, founded in 2014. In recent years it has been located in the Olneyville and Valley neighborhoods of the city. To date it is the largest fringe festival in New England.

FringePVD was founded by the Wilbury Theatre Group in 2014 and was inspired by fringe festivals like the Edinburgh Fringe Festival and the New York Fringe Festival. As with other fringe festivals, the festival is unjuried. Any group may apply and play the entrance fee to participate in the festival, and performers are chosen by lottery. Ticket prices are kept low, and all proceeds from the performances go to back to the performers. The festival also includes Family Fringe Day, with performances geared toward children and families.

There were about 300 artists performing at FringePVD in 2018. Venues for the festival have included AS220, WaterFire Arts Center, The Steel Yard, Wilbury Theatre Group and others. The festival is part of the United States Association of Fringe Festivals.
