= Earnscliffe Woolen-Paragon Worsted Company Mill Complex =

- U.S. National Register of Historic Places
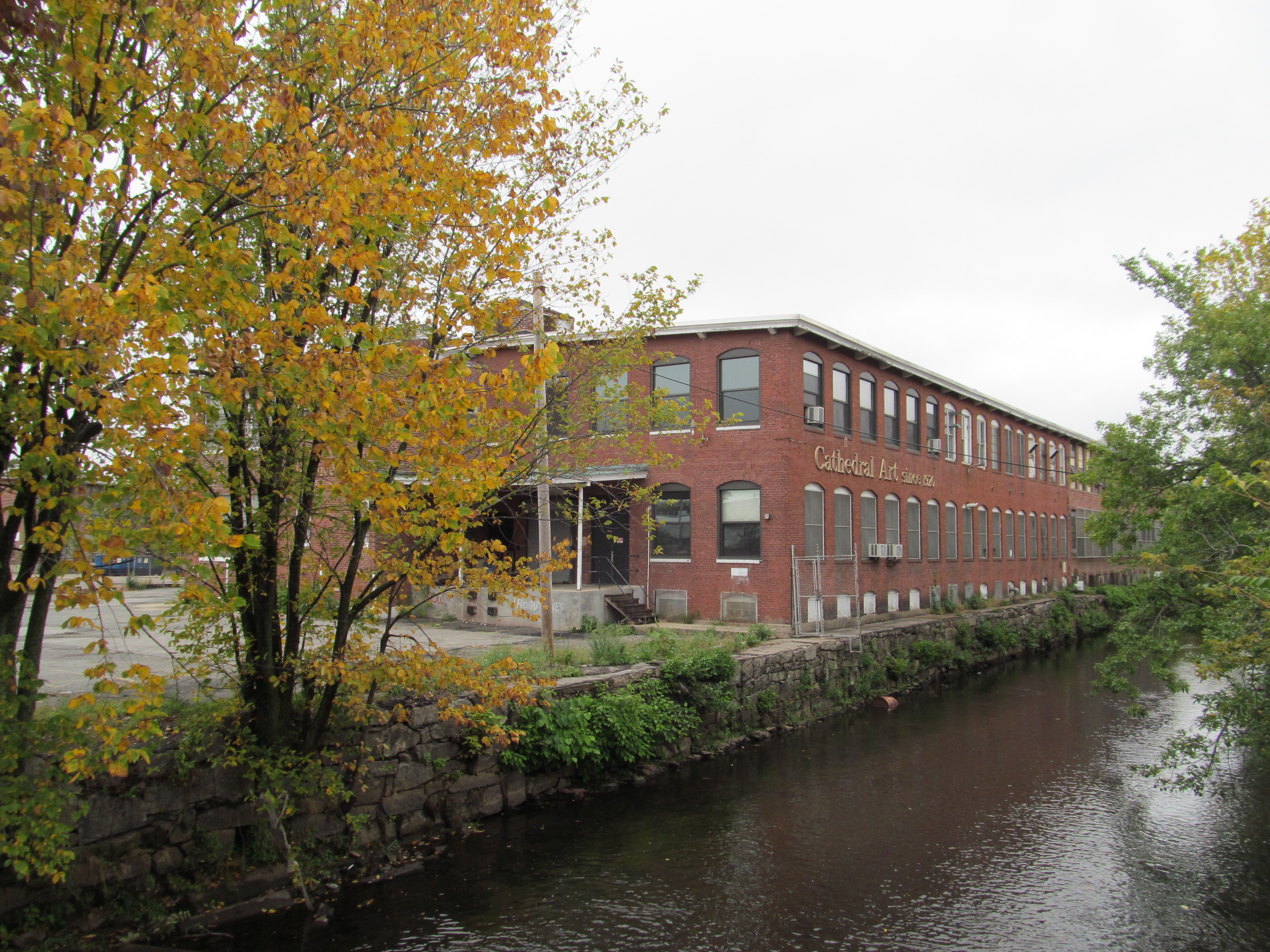
- Earnscliffe Woolen-Paragon Worsted Company Mill

- Location within Rhode Island Location within the United States
- Location: 25 and 39 Manton Ave., Providence, Rhode Island
- Coordinates: 41°49′5″N 71°26′39″W
- Area: 4.4 acres (1.8 ha)
- Built: 1898
- Architect: Leach, George; Maguire and Penniman
- Architectural style: 19th-20th century industrial
- NRHP reference No.: 07000265
- Added to NRHP: April 04, 2007

The Earnscliffe Woolen-Paragon Worsted Company Mill Complex (M&F Worsted; Artcraft Braid; Cathedral Art Metal Co.) is a historic mill at 25 and 39 Manton Avenue in Providence, Rhode Island. It consists of a grouping of eleven industrial buildings on 4.4 acres (1.8 ha) in the Olneyville neighborhood of Providence, on the banks of the Woonasquatucket River. The buildings were built between 1898 and about 1939. Building 1, the oldest building, began in 1898 as a two-story rectangular brick structure with a three-story tower and a monitor roof, but was expanded over the years, obscuring both the tower and the monitor. The complex was begun by the Earnscliff Woolen Company, which failed in 1909. The Paragon Worsted Company purchased the property, and operated on the premises until 1960, when the company closed the mill.

The mill was listed on the National Register of Historic Places in 2007.

== See also ==
- National Register of Historic Places listings in Providence, Rhode Island
