= Sachems' Deed =

1638 land grant from Narragansett sachems to Roger Williams

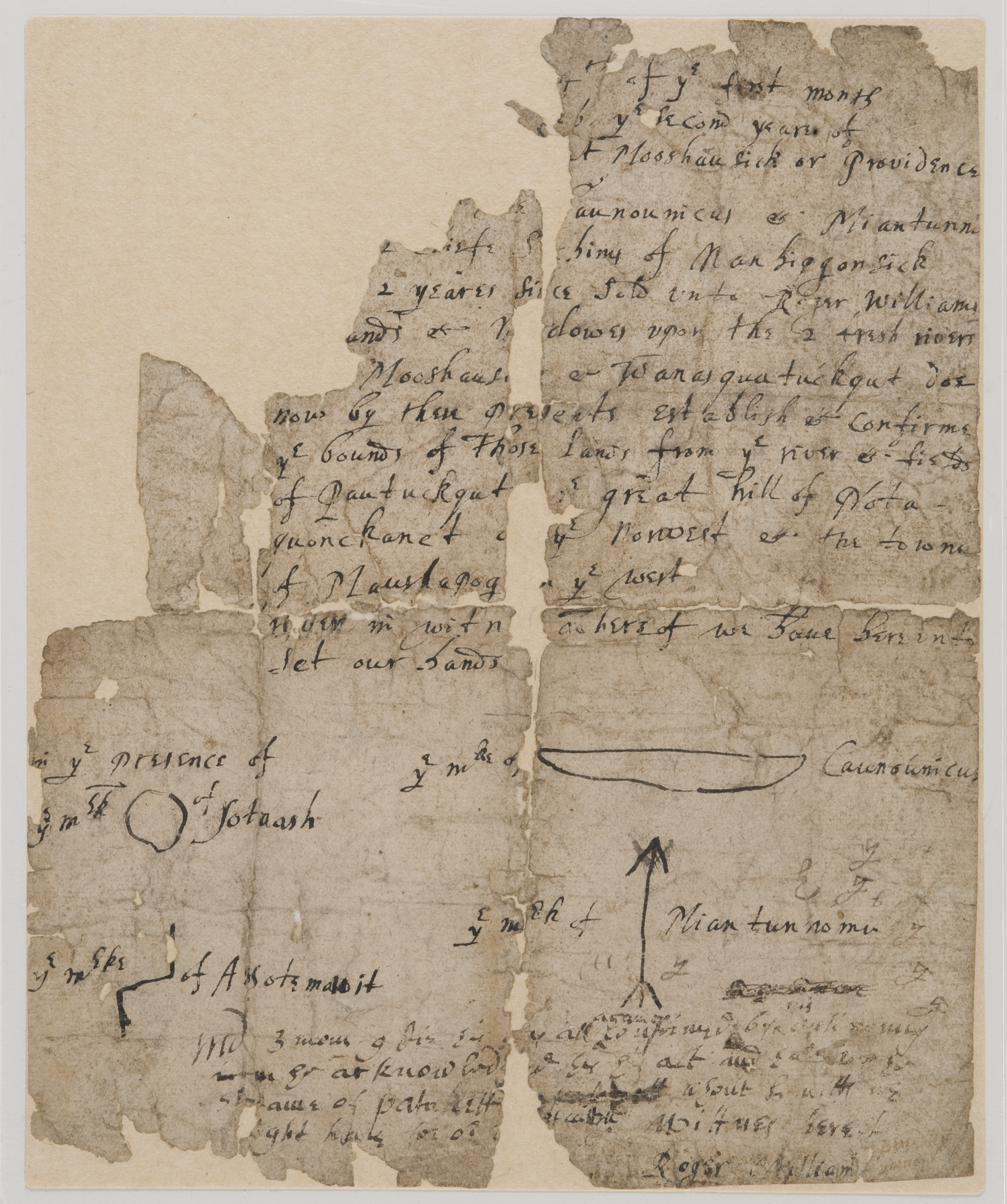
- The damaged original, missing the Pawtuxet clause, with the sachems' marks and the undated postscript
- Created: March 24, 1637/38
- Location: Providence City Hall
- Author: Roger Williams
- Signatories: Canonicus and Miantonomi (by their marks)
- Media type: Manuscript
- Subject: Land of Providence and Pawtuxet
- Purpose: Confirmation of the bounds of the Providence lands and gift of the Pawtuxet lands to Roger Williams

The Sachems' Deed, recorded in the town records as the Towne Evidence, is a document dated March 24, 1637/38, by which the Narragansett sachems Canonicus and Miantonomi confirmed and extended to Roger Williams the lands at Providence, in what is now Rhode Island. The bounds named were the fields of Pawtucket to the north, Neutaconkanut Hill and the Narragansett town of Mashapaug to the west, and the Pawtuxet River to the south. A postscript gave the settlers' cattle grazing rights up the Pawtucket and Pawtuxet rivers "without limmets".

The deed's vague bounds and the postscript's grazing rights led to land disputes that lasted until 1714. Several historians read the deed as granting rights to use the land rather than ownership. William Harris and some other Pawtuxet proprietors, by contrast, held that the deed, together with confirmations they obtained from later sachems in 1659, conveyed outright ownership. Harris went further, treating the postscript's grazing rights as a grant of land and extending his claims far beyond the 1638 bounds.

The original was damaged while in the keeping of William Arnold, and the clause granting the Pawtuxet lands is missing from it. Two opposite explanations followed. In the 17th century Arnold's accusers charged that he had cut the clause out of the genuine deed; in 1896 the antiquarian Sidney S. Rider argued the reverse, that the clause had never been in the deed and had been inserted into the 1658/59 copy, a charge he called forgery. The damaged original, which the city of Providence calls the 1638 Deed to Providence, is displayed at Providence City Hall.

== Background ==
Before his banishment from the Massachusetts Bay Colony, Williams had established a relationship with Canonicus and Miantonomi through trade, gift-giving, and his study of the Narragansett language. After fleeing Massachusetts in the winter of 1635/36, (Note: Dates in this article follow the Old Style calendar then used in England and its colonies, in which the year began on March 25; dates between January 1 and March 24 are given with both years, as in 1635/36.) he sheltered among the Wampanoag on the east bank of the Seekonk River. When the governor of Plymouth Colony, Edward Winslow, who was "loth to displease the Bay", advised him to move "to the other Side of the Water", Williams, with the consent of the Wampanoag sachem Ousamequin, obtained land rights from the Narragansett sachems and in the spring of 1636 settled near the mouth of the Moshassuck River.

Writing in 1661, Williams recalled that he had obtained the lands on the Moshassuck and Woonasquatucket rivers not with money, for "monies Could not doe it", but through his knowledge of the sachems' language, their favor toward him, and gifts given at his own expense. In a deed of 1666/67 he wrote that he had "purchased this plantation of the Natives partly by the Favour which I had long before with the sachims gotten at my Cost and hazzard and partly with my owne monies paid them in satisfaction for the setling of the said plantation". Near the end of his life, in a testimony dated June 18, 1682, he declared that "were it not for the favor God gave me with Canonicus, none of these parts, no, not Rhode Island, had been purchased or obtained, for I never got any thing out of Canonicus but by gift". Describing another Narragansett grant, he wrote that what he paid "was only gratuity, though I chose, for better assurance and form, to call it sale". The historians Anne Keary and Glenn W. LaFantasie, the latter the editor of Williams's correspondence, argue that grants of this kind were diplomatic gifts expressed in the legal form of English land sales.

A related question is whether the grant conveyed permanent ownership, as the English understood a purchase, or only the right to use the land. The literary historian Jeffrey Glover notes that a sachem's mark on a deed of this period "may have conferred privileges on the buyer ranging from usufruct rights to occupancy in perpetuity", and that "the possibility of such radically different interpretations made the system inherently unstable"; he describes the 1638 deed itself as conferring usufruct rights. In an 1897 study of the early land disputes in Providence, published by the Rhode Island Historical Society, Henry C. Dorr wrote that there was "little reason to believe" the sachems understood their grant "in the same sense in which it was received and paid for by the English settlers", since Narragansett land "belonged to the nation or tribe", its individual members having only temporary use of it. Keary describes Narragansett territory as held by the sachem on behalf of the whole people, with rights attaching less to the land itself than to what it yielded through the seasons. In 2021 the historian Julie A. Fisher contended that the Narragansett "never would have permanently alienated tribal land to a stranger". In her view, what Williams gave the sachems was tribute "in exchange for the right to live on the land", and the deed's reference to the "kindnesses and services he hath continually done for us" marks it as "one moment in an ongoing exchange". She argues that Williams understood "the obligation he owed Canonicus for the land", continuing to give him gifts until the sachem's death. In 2026 Sherenté Harris, a Narragansett tribal member, described the grant as Narragansett tradition understands it: "For our people, that was not a land sale, but the giving of usufruct rights, which was very common among our people", reflecting "our system of reciprocity".

The arrangement also advanced Narragansett interests. The historian Sydney V. James suggests that Canonicus and Miantonomi gained access to English trade while establishing a buffer against their Wampanoag rivals on the tribe's eastern frontier. He therefore characterizes Rhode Island as, in part, "a product of Narragansett Indian policy".

== The agreement ==
The deed is dated "At Nanhiggansick", March 24, 1637/38. (Note: On the same day Canonicus and Miantonomi signed a deed of Aquidneck Island to the Antinomian exiles from Massachusetts, which Williams witnessed; Chapin thought both deeds were probably signed at the same time and place.) It records two grants: a confirmation of the bounds of the lands and meadows on the Moshassuck and Woonasquatucket rivers, and a gift of the land south to the Pawtuxet River, made "in Consideration of the many Kindneses & services" Williams had done for the sachems with the English of Massachusetts, Connecticut and Plymouth. Keary notes that no money or wampum is mentioned, and reads the grant of "the Grasse & meaddowes upon Pautuxett River" as conveying usufruct rights "in accordance with Indian custom". Williams later described these services: he had been the sachems' "Councellour and Secretary" during their wars with the Pequots, and had put his boats, a hired servant, and his house at their disposal. The sachems signed by their marks in the presence of two Narragansett witnesses, Soatash and Assotemewett. (Note: The marks survive on the original. Miantonomi's is an arrow and Canonicus's a bow; Canonicus's has also been described as a canoe.) A postscript, which LaFantasie dates to May 9, 1639, records that Miantonomi again confirmed the grant and allowed the settlers' cattle to graze upriver. LaFantasie notes that the deed "showed no regard for the standard English legal forms for land instruments" and gave only a vague description of the bounds, which later allowed them "to become a matter of interpretation".

The deed recites that the sachems had "sold" Williams the lands on the two rivers "Two yeares since", in 1636. According to LaFantasie, Williams was at first satisfied with the sachems' verbal assurances, but complaints from his fellow proprietors, the householders who shared in the land, may have led him to have the grant set down in writing, "so the thirteen Providence proprietors could know what was theirs and what was not". Besides the damaged original, the text survives in two town records made about three years apart. Both give the deed and the cattle grazing postscript; they differ over the Pawtuxet clause and the year of the postscript.

=== Copy recorded in 1658/59 ===
The copy recorded on February 7, 1658/59, as printed in The Early Records of the Town of Providence. The bracketed number [165] is its page in the manuscript town records (Book 3A).

On February 7, 1658/59, William Arnold, who had kept the original, acknowledged before the town court that matching copies held by William Harris and Thomas Olney gave its "true words", and the town entered their text in its records (Book 3A, p. 165). It is the only record that includes the Pawtuxet clause and the only one that dates the cattle postscript to 1639; the authenticity of both was later disputed.

Att Nanhiggansick, The 24th of the first Month Comonly called March in the second yeare of our plantation, or planting at Moshausick, or Providence.

Memorandum, That wee Caunanicusse and Meiauantunnomu the two chiefe Sachims of Nanheggansuck, haveing Two yeares since sold unto Roger Williams the lands & meaddowes upon the two fresh Rivers called mowshausuck & wanasquatuckett, doe now by these presents Establish & Confirme the bounds of those lands from the Rivers & ffields of Pautuckett, The great hill of Neotaconkonitt on the norwest and the towne of Mashapauge on the west. As also in Consideration of the many Kindneses & services he hath continually done for us both with our friends of Massachusett, as also at Quinitikticutt, And Apaum or Plimouth, wee doe freely Give unto him all that land from those Rivers Reaching to Pautuxett River, as also the Grasse & meaddowes upon Pautuxett River, Jn witnes where of wee have hereunto set our hands in the presence of
The mark of Soatash The marke of Caunanicusse
The marke of Assotemewett The marke of Meiantenomu
1639, Memorandum. 3. month. 9. day This was all againe confirmed by Miantenomu he acknowledged this his act and hand up the streame of Pautuckett & Pautuxett without limmets wee might have for our use of Cattell.
wittnes here of Roger williams Benedict Arnold

— Copy recorded February 7, 1658/59

=== Damaged original recorded in 1662 ===
The damaged original as enrolled on April 4, 1662, as printed in The Early Records of the Town of Providence. The bracketed number [446] is its page in the manuscript town records (Book 3B).

On April 4, 1662, the town clerk, Thomas Olney Jr., enrolled the original itself "after it was defaced" in the town records (Book 3B, p. 446). His text agrees with the 1658/59 copy except in two places. It ends the deed at the western bound, "y^{e} Towne of Mashappauge on y^{e} West", without the clause granting the Pawtuxet lands, which is missing from the damaged original. It also includes the cattle postscript, but dates it only "M^{d} 3 Mont: 9 die", without the year 1639. The date of the deed itself is the same in both records. This damaged original survives today.

=== Bounds ===
The deed fixes the bounds of the Providence lands at three points, the fields of Pawtucket, Neutaconkanut Hill and the Narragansett town of Mashapaug, and gives the Pawtuxet River as the limit of the second grant. It names no eastern bound, where the lands met Narragansett Bay. The postscript's permission to graze cattle "up the streame of Pautuckett & Pautuxett without limmets" did not extend these bounds; Williams described it as a courtesy allowing the settlers' cows to feed up the rivers "where no body dwelt, and home againe at night".

From Neutaconkanut Hill, the highest point in Providence, the Narragansett had a view over the lands around the Great Salt Cove, Mashapaug Pond, the Moshassuck and Woonasquatucket rivers, and the Providence and Seekonk rivers at the head of the bay. According to Native oral histories recorded in its nomination to the National Register of Historic Places, to which it was added in 2026, the sachems showed Williams the limits of the grant by standing on the hill and spreading their arms. (Note: The nomination cites a personal conversation in 2022 with Two Hawks Watson and Joseph Waller.)

Places named as bounds in the deed
No.	Name in the deed	Direction in the deed	Modern identification
1	"Rivers & ffields of Pautuckett"	None stated; the northern limit of the first grant	Fields at the falls of the Pawtucket River
2	"great hill of Neotaconkonitt"	"on the norwest"	Neutaconkanut Hill
3	"towne of Mashapauge"	"on the west"	Narragansett town near Mashapaug Pond
4	"Pautuxett River"	None stated; the southern limit of the second grant	Pawtuxet River
Approximate locations; numbers match the table.

== Mutilation and forgery charges ==
Williams turned the Sachems' Deed over to the twelve other proprietors, and in the Initial Deed of 1638 confirmed their equal rights in both the Providence and Pawtuxet tracts. The Pawtuxet clause was what placed Pawtuxet within the sachems' grant: with it, the Pawtuxet lands belonged to the proprietors in common; without it, the grant ended at Mashapaug, and title to Pawtuxet would rest on other deeds, such as those William Arnold later obtained from the local sachem. The original was damaged while in Arnold's custody, and the clause is missing from it. Two opposite charges followed:

- Mutilation (1650 and 1677): William Field and William Harris accused Arnold of cutting out the clause to dispossess them of their Pawtuxet land, while Arnold maintained that it had been torn by accident.
- Forgery (1896): The antiquarian Sidney S. Rider argued the reverse: that the clause had never been part of the deed, and had been added to support the Pawtuxet proprietors' larger claims.

=== Mutilation charges (1650 and 1677) ===
William Arnold, his son Benedict, his son-in-law William Carpenter, and Robert Coles held a rival title to the Pawtuxet lands. In 1641/42 William Arnold, Coles and Carpenter bought land there from the local sachem Soconanoco, and in 1642 all four men placed themselves under the jurisdiction of Massachusetts. Benedict Arnold obtained a further deed from Soconanoco in 1644, and William Arnold one from Ousamequin in 1645.

In 1648 Arnold drove the servants of William Field, another Pawtuxet proprietor, off Field's land there. In the lawsuit that followed, Field charged that Arnold, "to obtaine his owne ends to deprive us of our wright of the said lands of Pautuxet", had "Cuningly Cut out" everything in the deed concerning Pawtuxet and pasted the remaining portions together. Arnold's attorney, Hugh Bewitt, answered that the damage was an "Accident or miscarriing", that the town or some of its inhabitants held "severall coppies of the towne evidence compleate and vnder the defendants William Arnold his owne hande", and that Arnold's land at Pawtuxet rested instead on a grant from Soconanoco. Massachusetts, which then claimed jurisdiction over Pawtuxet, ordered Rhode Island to "forebeare" the prosecution, and the case was dropped in 1650. By 1658 Arnold had broken with Massachusetts and allied himself with Harris, and when the town recorded the copies held by Harris and Olney in 1658/59, Arnold swore to their accuracy and repeated that the missing portion had been "torne by accident in his house at Pautuxet".

Harris, whose lawsuits rested on the Sachems' Deed and who always maintained that the clause had been part of it, repeated the charge in court in 1677, stating that the Pawtuxet section had been "taken out & the Paper, on both sides thereof put Edge to Edge and pasted together on another Paper". To show that the original deed had contained the clause, he added that the copies recorded in 1658/59 had been written in Arnold's own hand, and that Arnold had sworn to their truth.

A letter of 1708, which the historian Howard M. Chapin ascribed to Harris's daughter Howlong Harris Fenner, gave another explanation for the damage: Arnold's wife had taken the deed for waste paper, wrapped garden seeds in it, and thrown it away, and it was damaged lying out in the wet.

Modern historians remain divided. The historian Samuel Hugh Brockunier concluded that Arnold had cut the clause out to destroy "the evidence of the original title", so that the Soconanoco deed would give him, Carpenter and Coles sole title to Pawtuxet and let them dispossess Field, Harris and the other proprietors there. LaFantasie, noting that Arnold "seems not to have considered it of any special importance", accepts the garden seeds story.

=== Forgery charges (1896) ===
==== Rider's argument ====
In The Forgeries Connected with the Deed Given by the Sachems Canonicus and Miantinomi to Roger Williams, Rider argued that the Pawtuxet clause had never been in the deed. In his view it was inserted in 1658/59, when Harris and Arnold had the town enter their copy in its records, as one of the "steps in the development of a land conspiracy of great proportions". Combined with the deeds Harris obtained in 1659 from the surviving Narragansett sachems, which purported to confirm the original grant, the clause would extend the claim of the thirteen original Pawtuxet proprietors over the whole valley of the Pawtuxet River. He also pointed out that the clause's reference to services Williams had "continually" performed for the sachems described events after the deed's date, and that the grazing postscript would have been pointless if the land had already been granted outright.

Rider also challenged the postscript. In his view the year 1639, found in the 1658/59 copy but not on the original, had been added so that the Pawtuxet claim would predate the purchases by John Greene and Samuel Gorton at what became Warwick. Citing Williams's statement that "one amongst us (not I)" had recorded the postscript, and Benedict Arnold's sworn statement that he had not signed it, he concluded that both names on it were forged. The word "river", written in a different hand in the gap where the clause would have stood, he considered a later addition meant "to lead men to think" that the clause had been lost there; it was missing from the 1662 enrollment, he argued, because "in 1662 it was not there". He conceded that whether the deed had been mutilated "by design or accident no one knows".

==== Paine's reply ====
The antiquarian George T. Paine responded in A Denial of the Charges of Forgery in Connection with the Sachems' Deed to Roger Williams, read before the Rhode Island Historical Society on November 17, 1896, defending both the clause and Harris against Rider's charge of conspiracy; he found nothing in Harris's papers making him a partner of the Arnolds in their land purchases. He noted that the surviving cover sheet is two and a half inches longer than the damaged deed, enough to hold the missing language in Williams's hand, and that without the clause the deed lacked a southern bound. He cited Williams's Initial Deed and other early conveyances that treated the Pawtuxet lands as part of the original grant. He showed that Williams had served the sachems well before 1638, so the reference to his services was not anachronistic. The Arnolds' own deeds from Soconanoco and Ousamequin, he argued, gave them reason to remove the clause, not to insert it. He conceded that the year 1639 is not on the original, but argued that it had been supplied by someone who knew the correct date, without intent to deceive.

==== Later assessments ====
In 1916 Chapin, who examined the original, found that the watermark lines on its two pieces did not line up and that one watermark broke off at the tear, showing that a section of the paper had been lost. He attributed the omission of "river" from the 1662 enrollment to the clerk Thomas Olney Jr., who in copying the deed's 123 words made "at least 24 errors in spelling", so that leaving out one word "is not surprising, especially as that word as it stands in the defaced original does not make sense". He accepted 1639 as the year of the postscript, noting that nothing had been torn from the original where a year would stand, and that Williams's letter to Winthrop of that day suggests Miantonomi was then at Providence. He also cited Williams's deposition of 1677/78 naming Pawtuxet among the bounds of "our grand deed from the Sachims".

Rider had taken both names on the postscript as forgeries. Benedict Arnold, however, had stated in 1659/60 that, although the name on the deed was not in his hand, "he did Subscribe his name to such a paper as that is aboute that time", and LaFantasie notes that both witness names on the original postscript, Williams's and Arnold's, were written by Thomas James.

LaFantasie later judged that most earlier accounts of the controversy, Rider's and Paine's among them, were "polemical and jump to conclusions not always supported by evidence".

== Disputes over the extent of the grant ==
According to Sydney James, the Narragansett sachems had allowed the Providence settlers to pasture cattle along the Pawtuxet and other rivers as far inland as they wished. From the late 1650s William Harris argued that this privilege, together with other documents, amounted to a grant of all the land between the Pawtuxet and Blackstone rivers, a tract that would have taken in present-day Cranston, most of Johnston, Scituate and Foster, and half of Coventry. Williams maintained that the sachems had granted only a limited tract, and that any additional land required new grants from their successors.

In 1657 Harris obtained a deed from local sachems placing Pawtuxet's boundary eight miles up the Pawtuxet River; Brockunier notes that it "would, if valid, more than double the extent of Pawtuxet by setting the boundary four miles west of the line as described by Canonicus and Miantonomu". After Massachusetts gave up its claim to Pawtuxet in 1658, Harris and other proprietors asked Providence to extend its bounds twenty miles west of Fox's Hill, a hill at Fox Point in Providence that has since been levelled. In May 1659 the colony's Court of Commissioners instead allowed the town to buy out the Native people living within its existing bounds and to purchase up to 3,000 acres more.

Two weeks later, with both signers of the 1638 deed dead (Miantonomi had been executed in 1643 and Canonicus had died in 1647), Harris and others obtained a deed from Miantonomi's brother Caujaniquanet confirming the lands for twenty miles west of Fox's Hill, not only for cattle but for plowing and settlement. LaFantasie notes that Harris worded it as a confirmation of Miantonomi's 1639 postscript rather than as a new conveyance, so that a privilege to graze cattle became an outright grant of land. Over the next six months Harris obtained two further confirmatory deeds, from Pessicus and Ninigret and from Scuttop and Quequaquenuit; these gave the western bounds only as "up the streames without limittes" and provided that no Native occupants would be removed without their consent and compensation.

In 1659/60 Harris and other Pawtuxet proprietors sued the town of Warwick for letting its inhabitants cut grass in the Toskeunke meadows on the Pawtuxet. William Wickenden testified that the Providence bounds ran to a rock about as far inland as Neutaconkanut Hill. Stukeley Westcott, one of the original proprietors, testified:

Mr Williams Received the Landes of Providence from Miantonomu the Sachim but we had not Boundes Sett where upon we sente to the sd Sachim to come & Sett our Boundes, hee comeinge there was some Difference between or selves, so tht he went away and Lefte the Lande unbounded, and alsoe he saith that they never understood theire Boundes to be further then Pachaset River

— Stukeley Westcott, March 1659/60

The Pachaset, now the Pocasset River, lay far short of the twenty miles Harris now claimed. The colony's court nevertheless found for Harris, awarding small damages and in effect accepting his confirmation deeds.

A week later a Providence town meeting approved the twenty-mile line, but in May 1660 the town reversed itself and fixed its bounds at eight miles up the Pawtucket River and seven miles west of Fox's Hill. Williams continued to oppose Harris's claims, but in 1661–62 he and a town committee bought further tracts from Narragansett sachems as new purchases for the town.

In 1669 Williams reaffirmed his view of the western bound set by the sachems' deed of 1638. The sachems, he wrote, had been "hurried… to those short bounds, by reason of the Indians then at Maushapog Notakunkanet and Pawtuckat, beyond whom the Sachims could not then goe". Harris's own house at Pocasset lay outside them, and Williams said he had paid its Native occupants himself; settlers who went beyond the bounds paid "Satisfaction" when the Narragansett asked for it. The bounds, he wrote, were "knowne to themselves and the Natives round about us, who therefore cried Commootin, Commootin" ("stealing, stealing") "when ever We have exceeded the Bounds in the Sachims deed expressed", and he had "never understood infinite and boundles matters, no nor 20 miles".

Western bounds claimed for Providence and Pawtuxet
No.	Bound	Claimed by	Date	Basis
★	Fox's Hill, Fox Point	—	—	Starting point for measuring the western bounds
1,2	Neutaconkanut Hill and Mashapaug	Sachems' deed	1638	Bounds named in the deed; in 1669 Williams wrote that they had been set short "by reason of the Indians then at Maushapog Notakunkanet and Pawtuckat"
20	Twenty mile line	William Harris	1659	Caujaniquanet's confirmation deed extending twenty miles west of Fox's Hill
3	Pocasset River	Stukeley Westcott	1659/60	Testimony that "they never understood theire Boundes to be further then Pachaset River"
7	Seven mile line	Providence town meeting	May 1660	Seven miles west of Fox's Hill, then north to the Pawtucket River and south to the Pawtuxet
F	Paupauqunnuppog (Fenner Pond)	Roger Williams	1678	The furthest the sachems "would never Suffer" the bounds "to Extend beyond"
Approximate reconstruction; numbers match the table.

Harris argued that because the deed granted the lands "upon the two fresh rivers", the grant followed those rivers to "the utmost length", their sources, and that the places named in the deed did not limit how far west the grant reached. In 1677 a special court of commissioners ruled in his favor. It ordered the east–west line between Providence and Pawtuxet extended westward to a cross line joining the sources of the Woonasquatucket and Pawtuxet rivers, with the land south of the line going to the Pawtuxet proprietors. Williams's party laid out that cross line so that the proprietors gained almost nothing. Writing to the commissioners in June 1678, Williams maintained that the sachems "would never Suffer" the bounds "to Extend beyond Paupauqunnuppog", the pond later called Fenner Pond in Cranston, "far short of W. Har his being at Pauchasit wch was ever accounted by the Indians a Violation". The dispute ended in 1714, when the Pawtuxet proprietors settled for the western half of Cranston and the southern part of Johnston, far less than Harris had claimed.

== Preservation of the original deed ==
By 1896 the damaged original had been inlaid in a wide margin of strong paper and bound, with its original cover sheet, in a "book of Indian deeds" at Providence City Hall, where it was kept in the office of the Recorder of Deeds. It was restored in 1942 under the direction of the recorder, Edward M. Flanagan, and by 1953 hung in a locked frame in his office, where few visitors knew to look for it; the Evening Bulletin described it as "the basic document in tracing title of ownership to much of the land in the modern city". In 1966 it was reported to be still at City Hall.

The city lent it to the "Rhode Island Treasures" exhibition in 2003, and on August 7, 2009, transferred it from the City Archives, then housed below City Hall's leaking dome, to the Rhode Island State Archives. On February 18, 2020, the deed, which the city calls the "1638 Deed to Providence", returned to City Hall and was placed on permanent display with the city's other founding documents outside the City Council chambers on the third floor, in a climate-controlled case beside a touchscreen kiosk with transcriptions in English and Spanish. A reproduction is shown at the Rhode Island State House.

== See also ==
- Initial Deed (Providence)
- Providence Combination of 1640
- Providence Civil Compact

== Sources ==
- Armental, Maria (August 7, 2009). "Roger Williams' Deed Moved to New, Safer Home". The Providence Journal – via NewsBank.
- Bartlett, John Russell, ed. (1874). Letters of Roger Williams, 1632–1682. Publications of the Narragansett Club. Vol. 6. Providence: Narragansett Club.
- Brockunier, Samuel Hugh (1940). The Irrepressible Democrat: Roger Williams. Ronald Series in History. New York: Ronald Press.
- Chapin, Howard M. (1916). Documentary History of Rhode Island. Vol. 1. Providence: Preston and Rounds.
- Dorr, Henry C. (1897). The Proprietors of Providence, and Their Controversies with the Freeholders (PDF). Collections of the Rhode Island Historical Society. Vol. 9. Providence: Rhode Island Historical Society.
- Doyle, James J. (April 22, 1953). "It Is Not Very Well Displayed: City's Original Land Deed From Indians Known to Few". The Evening Bulletin. Providence. p. 57 – via NewsBank.
- Rogers, Horatio; Carpenter, George Moulton; Field, Edward, eds. (1893). The Early Records of the Town of Providence. Vol. 4: Being Part of the Third Book of the Town of Providence Otherwise Called the Book with Brass Clasps. Record Commissioners. Providence: Snow & Farnham.
- Rogers, Horatio; Carpenter, George Moulton; Field, Edward, eds. (1894). The Early Records of the Town of Providence. Vol. 5: Being Part of the Third Book of the Town of Providence Otherwise Called the Book with Brass Clasps. Record Commissioners. Providence: Snow & Farnham.
- Rogers, Horatio; Field, Edward, eds. (1899). The Early Records of the Town of Providence. Vol. 15: Being the Providence Town Papers, Vol. 1, 1639–April 1682, Nos. 01–0367. Record Commissioners. Providence: Snow & Farnham.
- Farzan, Antonia Noori (February 14, 2026). "Highest Point in Providence Now on National Register of Historic Places". The Providence Journal.
- Fisher, Julie A. (September 2021). "Roger Williams and the Indian Business". The New England Quarterly. 94 (3): 352–393. doi:10.1162/tneq_a_00902. JSTOR 27066317.
- Glickman, Ben (February 26, 2020). "Providence Founding Documents Return to City Hall". The Brown Daily Herald.
- Glover, Jeffrey (2006). "Wunnaumwáyean: Roger Williams, English Credibility, and the Colonial Land Market". Early American Literature. 41 (3): 429–453. JSTOR 25057463.
- Brigham, Clarence S., ed. (1902). Harris Papers. Collections of the Rhode Island Historical Society. Vol. 10. Providence: Rhode Island Historical Society.
- James, Sydney V. (1975). Colonial Rhode Island: A History. New York: Charles Scribner's Sons.
- Jones, Brian C. (August 7, 1966). "Roger Williams Deed Found in Newport". The Providence Journal. pp. 1–2 – via NewsBank.
- Keary, Anne (1996). "Retelling the History of the Settlement of Providence: Speech, Writing, and Cultural Interaction on Narragansett Bay". The New England Quarterly. 69 (2): 250–286. doi:10.2307/366667. JSTOR 366667.
- LaFantasie, Glenn W., ed. (1988). The Correspondence of Roger Williams. Vol. 1: 1629–1653. Assisted by Robert S. Cocroft et al.; revised from an unpublished manuscript edited by Bradford F. Swan. Hanover, N.H.: Brown University Press / University Press of New England for the Rhode Island Historical Society.
- LaFantasie, Glenn W., ed. (1988). The Correspondence of Roger Williams. Vol. 2: 1654–1682. Assisted by Robert S. Cocroft et al.; revised from an unpublished manuscript edited by Bradford F. Swan. Hanover, N.H.: Brown University Press / University Press of New England for the Rhode Island Historical Society.
- Paine, George T. (1896). A Denial of the Charges of Forgery in Connection with the Sachems' Deed to Roger Williams. A paper read before the Rhode Island Historical Society, November 17, 1896. Providence: Standard Printing Company.
- Pineo, Gretchen; Miller, Jill; Adams, Virginia H.; Zionts, Sophie; Zurier, Sarah (December 2025). National Register of Historic Places Registration Form: Neutaconkanut Hill Park Historic District (PDF) (Draft nomination). Public Archaeology Laboratory and Rhode Island Historical Preservation & Heritage Commission.
- Providence City Council (February 18, 2020). "The Return of the City of Providence's Founding Documents to City Hall" (Press release).
- Richman, Irving B. (1902). "The Land Controversies of William Harris". Harris Papers. Collections of the Rhode Island Historical Society. Vol. 10. Calendar and notes by Clarence S. Brigham. Providence: Rhode Island Historical Society. pp. 11–22.
- Rider, Sidney S. (1896). The Forgeries Connected with the Deed Given by the Sachems Canonicus and Miantinomi to Roger Williams of the Land on Which the Town of Providence Was Planted. Rhode Island Historical Tracts. Vol. 2nd ser., no. 4. Providence: Sidney S. Rider.
- Rider, Sidney S. (1904). The Lands of Rhode Island as They Were Known to Caunounicus and Miantunnomu When Roger Williams Came in 1636. Providence: Printed for the author.
- The Rhode Island State House: A Self-Guided Tour (Brochure). Providence: Legislative Press and Public Information Bureau for the Joint Committee on Legislative Services. 2021.
- Van Siclen, Bill (May 4, 2003). "Treasuring Little Rhody: 'Rhode Island Treasures' Celebrates Our History". The Providence Journal. p. I-1 – via NewsBank.
- "Welcome to Fox Point". The Historical Marker Database (Historical marker, Providence Harbor Walk, George M. Cohan Boulevard). August 4, 2014.
- "William Harris". Rhode Island Heritage Hall of Fame.
- Zelenke, Keating (June 23, 2026). "Narragansett Ceremonial Place and Urban Oasis: Neutaconkanut Hill Is Providence's Newest National Historic District". Providence Preservation Society.
