= Elli Panichas =

American conservationist and graphic designer (1931–2025)

Eleanor B. Panichas
- Born: Eleanor B. Vallante; October 15, 1931
- Died: November 4, 2025 (aged 94)
- Other name: Elli Panichas
- Occupations: Conservationist, publications director, graphic designer
- Known for: Founding the Neutaconkanut Hill Conservancy
- Spouse: Anthony T. Panichas

Eleanor B. "Elli" Panichas (née Vallante; October 15, 1931 – November 4, 2025) was an American conservationist and graphic designer from Providence, Rhode Island. She was director of publications at Rhode Island College until 1984 and then ran her own design firm. She founded the Neutaconkanut Hill Association, later the Neutaconkanut Hill Conservancy. In 1976 the association persuaded the city not to build housing in Providence's Neutaconkanut Hill Park and later it cleared and restored the park. She first sought a National Register of Historic Places listing for the park in 1976; it was listed in February 2026, a few months after her death.

== Early life ==
Panichas was born on October 15, 1931, the daughter of Edmund and Jennie (Sarro) Vallante. She grew up in the Silver Lake neighborhood next to Neutaconkanut Hill, which she called her playground after the Depression. Her father taught her to identify trees and mushrooms there.

== Career ==
Panichas worked at Rhode Island College for 18 years, the last 11 as director of publications. In 1983 her office won six Exceptional Achievement Awards and a Special Merit Award from the Council for Advancement and Support of Education. She left in 1984 to start her own firm, Communication and Design Management, whose clients included the Bristol Fourth of July Parade. In 1987 she led Imperial Associates, a group of 15 artists and designers that planned to convert part of the former Imperial Knife complex in Providence's Jewelry District into about 20 studios.

== Neutaconkanut Hill ==
=== Saving the park (1976) ===
By 1976 Panichas was president of the Neutaconkanut Hill Association. That June, the Cianci administration proposed building elderly housing on part of Neutaconkanut Park. Panichas led about 100 Silver Lake residents at a Park Commission hearing, read a history of the park, and argued that Abby Allen King's 1915 bequest limited the land to park use. In May the association had applied to have the land listed on the National Register. On July 6, 1976, the commission voted unanimously to keep the land and to seek money to restore the park.

=== Restoration ===
In later decades the park was used for illegal dumping and for stripping stolen cars. Panichas led a cleanup in which volunteers, many of them Providence College students, removed more than ten cars and over a hundred tires and reopened trails built by the Works Progress Administration in the 1930s. Conservancy president Robert Fitzpatrick said in 2015 that the work took more than ten years. In 2006 the group and the Woonasquatucket River Watershed Council received a $50,000 state grant to clear the trails. Panichas was a director of Neutaconkanut Hill Associates, incorporated in 2005; the Neutaconkanut Hill Conservancy was incorporated as a 501(c)(3) nonprofit in 2009. After many years as president, she became the conservancy's executive director in 2015. She also served for many years on the Providence Board of Park Commissioners and received a citation from the mayor for that service.

=== National Register listing ===
In February 2026 the National Park Service listed the 85-acre park on the National Register as the Neutaconkanut Hill Park Historic District. Sarah Zurier, the state architectural historian who co-wrote the nomination, said Panichas had wanted the park nominated since the 1970s. Robert McMahon, a former Providence parks superintendent, called the listing "a testimony to [her] vision and dedication."

== Personal life and death ==
Panichas was of Italian descent. She was married for 64 years to Anthony T. Panichas, who was of Greek descent, and the couple attended both of their churches. Her husband and her son, Michael A. Panichas, died before her. She died on November 4, 2025, at the age of 94.
