= Darcie Dennigan =

American writer

- Born: 1975 (age 50–51); Rhode Island
- Education: University of Massachusetts (B.A.); University of Michigan (M.F.A.)
- Occupations: Poet; playwright; educator

Darcie Dennigan (born 1975 in Rhode Island) is an American poet and playwright.

== Life ==
Dennigan received a Bachelor of Arts in literature from the University of Massachusetts and a Master of Fine Arts from the University of Michigan.

Dennigan is an associate professor of English at the University of Connecticut and the Wilbury Theatre Group's playwright-in-residence.

Dennigan lives in Providence, Rhode Island.

== Works ==
Dennigan's first book of poetry was Corinna, A-Maying the Apocalypse published by Fordham University Press in 2008.

Madame X was Dennigan's second book, and it challenged, according to critic Arielle Greenberg, the conventional verse forms of poetry, without however going so far from the norm that it could have been considered something else. Having earlier stated in an interview with West Branch that her use of ellipses "has mostly met with not much success", and having had theretofore sought to avoid them because of this, Dennigan used them liberally in the book in place of breaking up poems with stanzas or line breaks. The initial and final subjects of the book are, respectively, a birth and a death, and the ones in between each have their own narrators and tackle such subjects as drought, terrorism, and apocalypse.

The narrators are each well-intentioned but flawed, voluble and blasphemous, charming and self-destructive; ranging from the head nurse of a hospice dealing with a nuclear holocaust to the girl who considers her boyfriend to be a genius because he believes that ancient astronauts built the pyramids. The blasphemy is exemplified by (for two examples) a modern pietà depicting "the Virgin mourning Christ as a miscarriage" and (in "Catholic School Reunion") the character stating that "I too would like to imagine sex and have my own Jesus."

The poems contain vulgarity and references to sexual deviancy, such as the one character who tells the reader that "But angels, burns are totally worth the pleasure of giving a light sabre a blow job." and another character, a sacristan who states that "Even if I believed the Word became flesh, well — / I'd probably just want to have sex with it.". Many of the poems play with language, with malapropisms such as "porridge" for "marriage" and "weary me" for "marry me", and the penultimate poem ("The Error of My Maze") even directly discussing what it terms the "social-spatial forensics of the M-W swap" (e.g. "wine"/"mine" and indeed "Maze" for "Ways" in the poem's title).

The cover art for Madame X is by Dennigan's former husband, artist Carl Dimitri.

Dennigan's other poetry collections are Palace of Subatomic Bliss, and The Parking Lot and other feral scenarios. She is also the author of the novel Slater Orchard: En Etymology and the plays Dolores Goes to Poetry City, The Pleiades, RESCUE! Or, The Fish, as well as Happy End, an adaptation of Mónica de la Torre's The Happy End / All Welcome.

Dennigan's review of Dean Young's The Art of Recklessness entitled "A Review?" is, according to Stephen M. Morrow, not in fact a review at all, but an enactment of the very ideas that Young puts forward in his book. After a string of welcomes for various readers, including the "two lit-crit geeks up late at night who found this by googling John Barth", Dennigan recounts an anecdote about Gertrude Stein, explains her own teaching style, riffs on a quotation from Donald Barthelme, and says of the book that "Rather than studying it, you’d do better to tear out its pages, eat them, and let Dean Young’s excited ink stimulate your spleen into writing poems...".

== Honors and awards ==
- 2007 Discovery/The Nation
- 2007 Poets Out Loud Prize (for Corinna A-Maying the Apocalypse)
- 2011 Cecil Hemley Award from the Poetry Society of America
- 2019 Anna Rabinowitz Award from the Poetry Society of America
- Rhode Island State Council of the Arts Poetry Fellowship
