= Valley, Providence, Rhode Island =

Neighborhood in Rhode Island, United States

Coordinates: 41.8293°N 71.4349°W

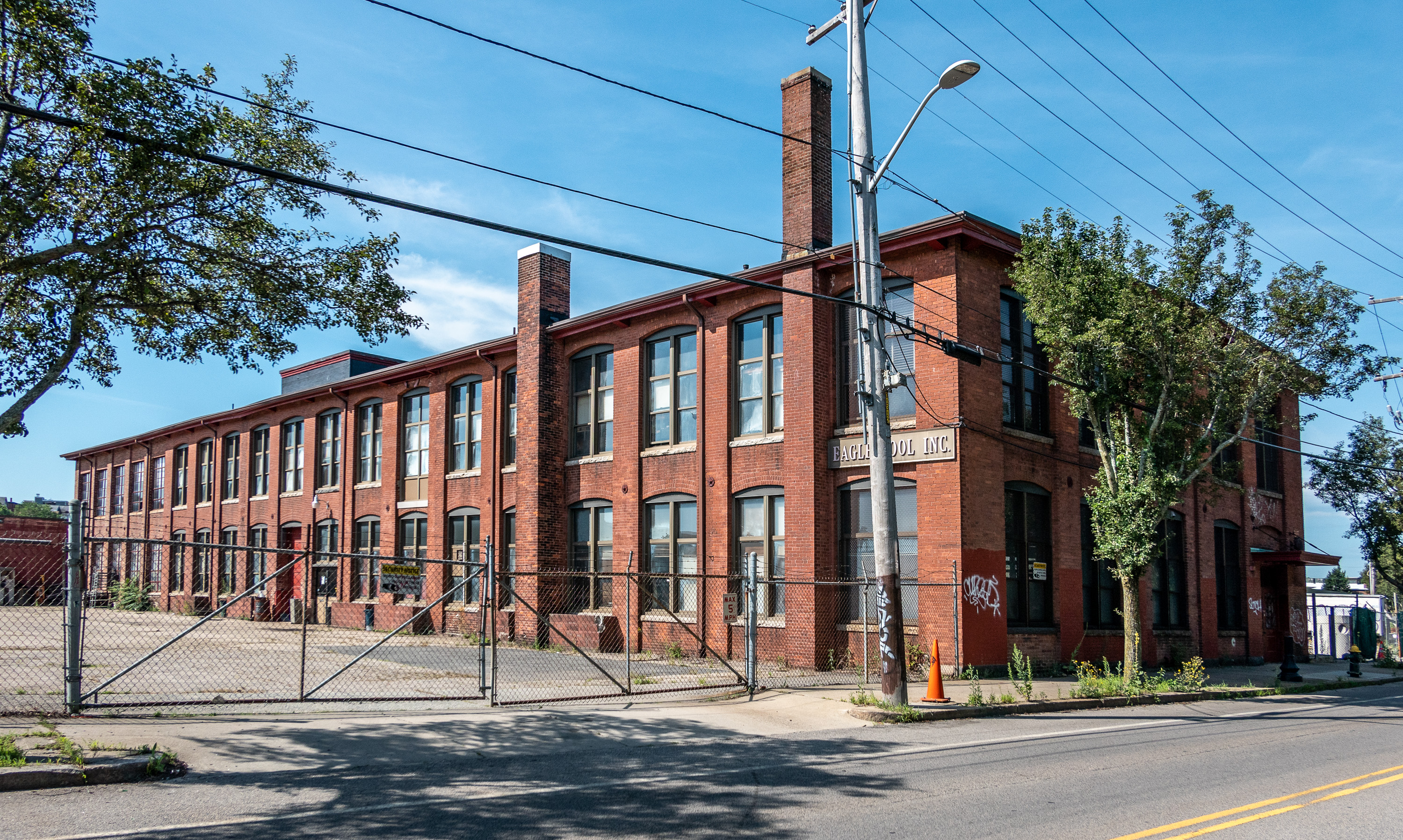
Eagle Tool is a jewelry manufacturer on Kinsey Street in Valley

Valley is a neighborhood in northwestern Providence, Rhode Island. It is bounded to the north by Chalkstone Avenue, to the east by Raymond Street, to the south by Harris Avenue and Atwells Avenue, and to the west by Academy Avenue. The population of the neighborhood, as of 2000, was 4,765.

== Geography ==
Valley is bisected by Valley Street. North of Valley Street are double- and triple-decker family homes. South of Valley Street are old factories and mills.

The southern part of the neighborhood includes many former factories and mills along the Woonasquatucket River, including makers of locomotive engines, automobiles, cars and trucks. These included the Providence Iron and Steel Co, Monohasset Mill, U.S. Rubber, American Locomotive Co., and others. Many of these have been converted to artist lofts and urban office complexes, such as The Steel Yard. In 2020 a distillery, the first in Providence since Prohibition, opened in the neighborhood.

== Demographics ==
The neighborhood is 32.5% Non-Hispanic White, 5.2% Asian or Pacific Islander, 14.6% African-American, and 42.4% Hispanic. The median household income is $25,077, and the median family income is $25,339. 26.4% of families live below the poverty line.

== Arts and culture ==
The Valley Arts District is a corridor for arts, dining, and recreation along the Woonasquatucket River. Its venues host the annual arts festival FringePVD. In April 2023, the Latino performing arts organization Teatro ECAS moved from the Elmwood neighborhood to the Valley Arts District.
