= Wilbury Theatre Group =

Coordinates: 41.8203726°N 71.4421288°W

- Type: Theatre group
- Location: 475 Valley Street, Providence, Rhode Island
- Artistic director: Josh Short
- Website: www.thewilburygroup.org

The Wilbury Theatre Group is a nonprofit theatre located in the Olneyville neighborhood of Providence, Rhode Island. It is known for its experimental theater and its annual fringe festival, FringePVD.

Wilbury Theatre Group was founded in 2010. The name is a reference to the Traveling Wilburys. After years performing in warehouses and unconventional performance spaces throughout Providence, the group became the theatre company in residence at the Southside Cultural Center in 2013. The group moved from the Southside Cultural Center to its own space in Olneyville in 2017. They moved again in 2021 to the WaterFire Arts Center in Providence's Valley Arts District. The group's artistic director, Josh Short, has been with the Wilbury Theatre since it began.

Since its founding, the Wilbury Theatre Group has produced over 100 shows. Productions have included Fun Home, Spring Awakening, and Rosencrantz and Guildenstern are Dead, and works by prominent Rhode Island artists like Darcie Dennigan, Christopher Johnson, Vanessa Gilbert, and Vatic Kuumba, and Rebecca Noon.

The theater also supports the creation of new works through its Studio W program, offers acting classes, actor and playwright residencies, and community outreach.

The Wilbury Theatre Group started Rhode Island's fringe festival, FringePVD, in 2014. It is the largest fringe theater festival in New England.
