= National and Providence Worsted Mills =

- U.S. National Register of Historic Places
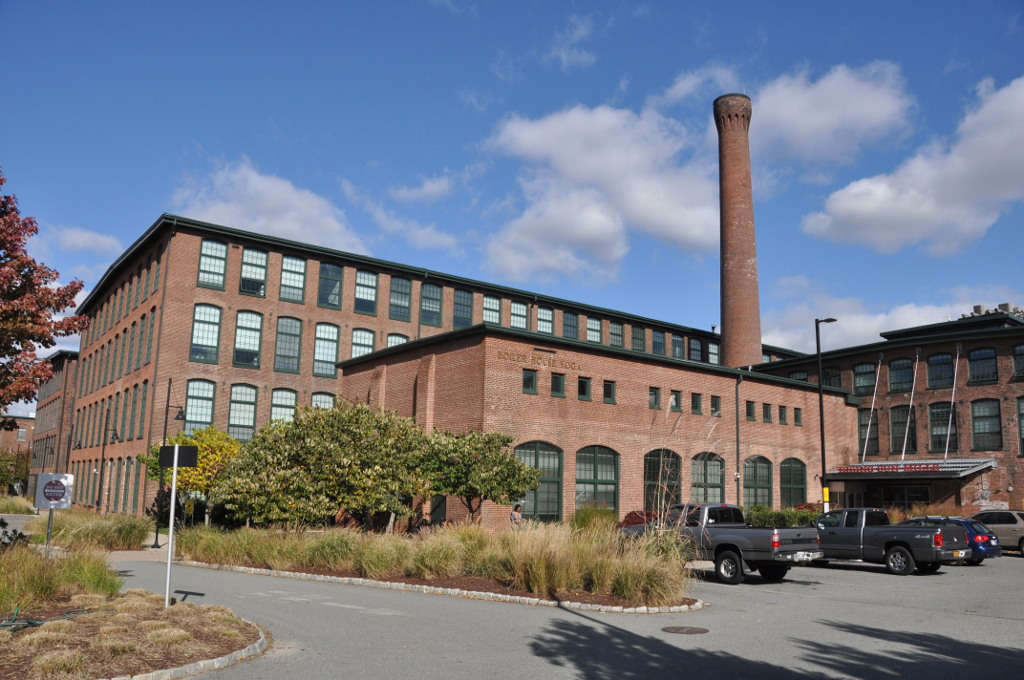

- Location within Rhode Island Location within the United States
- Location: Providence, Rhode Island
- Coordinates: 41°49′16″N 71°26′27″W
- Area: 10 acres (4.0 ha)
- Built: 1881
- NRHP reference No.: 03000656
- Added to NRHP: July 11, 2003

The Rising Sun Mill, formerly the National and Providence Worsted Mills, are a historic textile mill complex located at 166 Valley Street in Providence, Rhode Island. The complex consists of thirteen brick and stone structures, ranging in height from one to four stories, located on the banks of the Woonasquatucket River in the Olneyville neighborhood of the city. Most of them were built between 1880 and 1890, with a small number from 1907 and later. The National and Providence Company and its successors operated here from 1881 into the 1950s, a time period when Providence was a leading manufacturer of worsted wool material.

The mills were listed on the National Register of Historic Places in 2003.

== See also ==
- National Register of Historic Places listings in Providence, Rhode Island
