= Weybosset Mills Complex =

- U.S. National Register of Historic Places
- U.S. Historic district
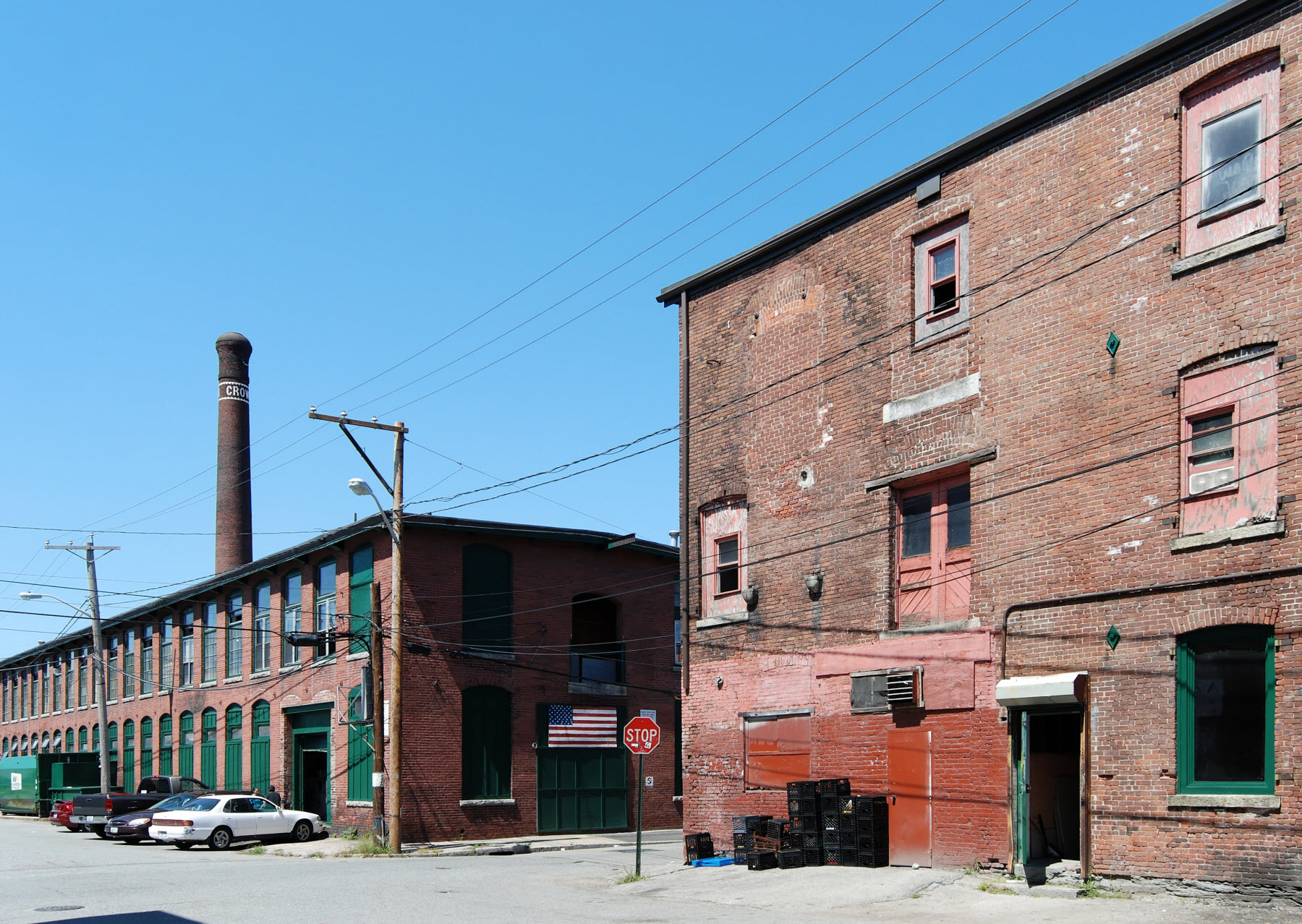

- Location within Rhode Island Location within the United States
- Location: Providence, Rhode Island
- Coordinates: 41°48′52″N 71°26′31″W
- Area: 3.4 acres (1.4 ha)
- Built: 1836
- NRHP reference No.: 07001381
- Added to NRHP: January 10, 2008

The Weybosset Mills Complex is a historic industrial site in the Olneyville section of Providence, Rhode Island. It consists of nine historic brick factory buildings, located on three city blocks west of Rhode Island Route 10 and north of United States Route 6, just northwest of their junction. The three blocks are bounded on the south by Magnolia Street, and on the east by railroad tracks paralleling Route 10. The southern two blocks end at Agnes and Oak Streets, while the northerly block is bounded on the west by Troy Street and the north by Dike Street. The oldest building in the complex is a three-story brick boiler house built c. 1836. Although the origins of this mill complex were as a cotton mill, the Weybosset Corporation purchased it in 1864, and transformed it into one of the nation's major producers of worsted wool products.

The complex was listed on the National Register of Historic Places on January 10, 2008.

== See also ==
- National Register of Historic Places listings in Providence, Rhode Island
