= Teatro ECAS =

Nonprofit theater in Providence, Rhode Island, United States

Coordinates: 41.809275°N 71.424311°W

Teatro ECAS, also called ECAS Theater, is a non-profit theater in Providence, Rhode Island that produces Latino plays. It is located at 679 Valley Street in Providence's Valley Arts District.

== History ==
Teatro ECAS was founded in 1997 as part of an arts and education collaborative created by Providence public school teachers. Its founding artistic director was Francis Parra. The Educational Center for the Arts and Science was a multidisciplinary approach to after school and weekend programming for students in Providence. Teatro ECAS grew to produce and stage original and classic works of Latino theater, provide theatrical instruction to youth and adults, and bring theater companies from across the US and Latin America to Rhode Island.

In April 2023, Teatro ECAS moved from the Elmwood neighborhood to the Valley Arts District in Valley, Providence. It operates a 90-seat black box theater and community arts space.
