= Silver Lake, Providence, Rhode Island =

Neighborhood on the western edge of Providence, Rhode Island

Coordinates: 41.8109°N 71.4542°W

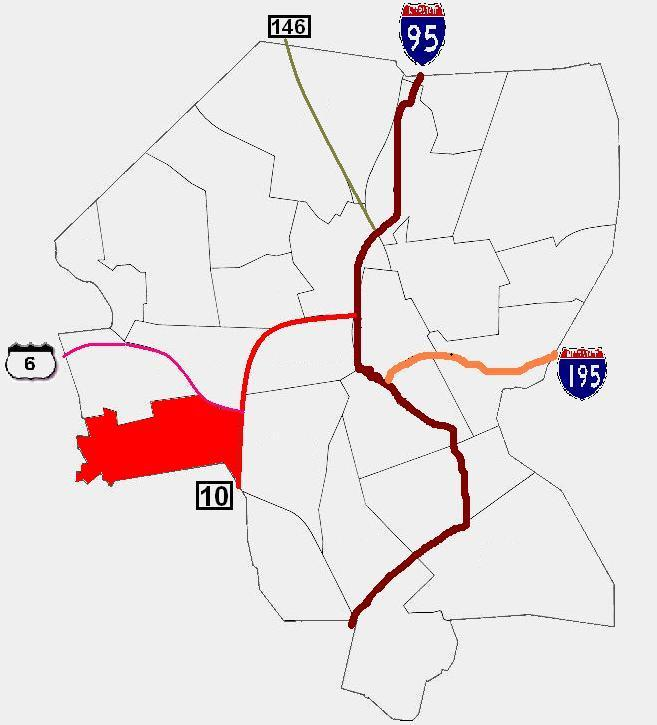
Providence neighborhoods with Silver Lake in red

Silver Lake is a neighborhood on the western edge of Providence, Rhode Island. It is bordered by the Hartford neighborhood to the north, Route 10 to the east, Johnston and Cranston on the West and separated from Olneyville by Route 6.

Like Federal Hill, Silver Lake was traditionally an Italian-American neighborhood. Since the mid-1990s, Silver Lake has undergone a radical transformation into a largely Hispanic neighborhood, as evidenced by the recent influx of Central American restaurants, bars and markets.

== History ==
Settlement in Silver Lake began after the completion of the Plainfield Road to Plainfield, Connecticut in 1710. Farmers settled the area shortly afterward. Isolated from the rest of Providence, some sought to secede from Providence before the town of Johnston, Rhode Island annexed Silver Lake in 1759.

Silver Lake took its name from the original approximately ten acre lake located in the area bordered by Murray, Sybil, Mercy and Plainfield Streets. At the turn of the 20th century, it was graded with landfill and debris then became the site of a supermarket and bank for many years.

Suburban development in the 19th century led Providence to reacquire Silver Lake in 1898. Shortly thereafter, Silver Lake witnessed its most significant period of development in the early 20th century prior to the Great Depression. From the late 19th century until the 1970s the neighborhood was predominately Italian with Irish, Polish, English and a mix of other European immigrants.

== Demographics ==
In 1990, nearly 43% of Silver Lake residents claimed some Italian ancestry. That same census showed that about 7% of Silver Lake's residents Hispanic, 2.3% were Asian, and 2% were African-American. Median family income in Silver Lake was $27,736, about 2% lower than the citywide average. 16% of families lived in poverty.

According to the 2000 census, 10,943 persons resided in Silver Lake, an increase from the 9,141 residents who called Silver Lake home in 1990. Between 1990 and 2000 the percentage of non-white residents in Silver Lake rose from 11 percent to 57.6 percent. 42 percent of Silver Lake's residents were Hispanic; 42% were White; 3.7 percent were Asian; and 8 percent were African-American. In 2000, more than half (58%) of the residents of age 25 or older were high school graduates. 59% of children under the age of six speak a language other than English as their primary language.

Housing tenure in Silver Lake has remained mostly unchanged over the past decade. The proportion of owner-occupied housing units declined slightly from 36.6 percent to 35 percent between 1990 and 2000. About a fifth of all housing units in Silver Lake are single-family units, and most other structures house two to four families. 8 percent of all housing units in Silver Lake are located in buildings with five or more housing units, reflecting the more suburban character of much of the neighborhood.

The median family income was $27,981, below the citywide average of $32,058. 28% of families were below the poverty level while 15% receive some form of public assistance. 18% of children under the age of six had been exposed to high levels of lead.

== Government ==
Over half of Silver Lake is within Ward 7, which is represented in the Providence City Council by Democrat Ana Vargas. The eastern portion of Silver Lake is within Ward 15, represented by Democrat Oscar Vargas. Ward 15 was formerly represented by the current Rhode Island Lieutenant Governor Sabina Matos, the first Dominican-American elected to statewide office in the United States as well as the first Black statewide officeholder in Rhode Island.

== Parks ==
=== Neutaconkanut Park ===
Neutaconkanut Park

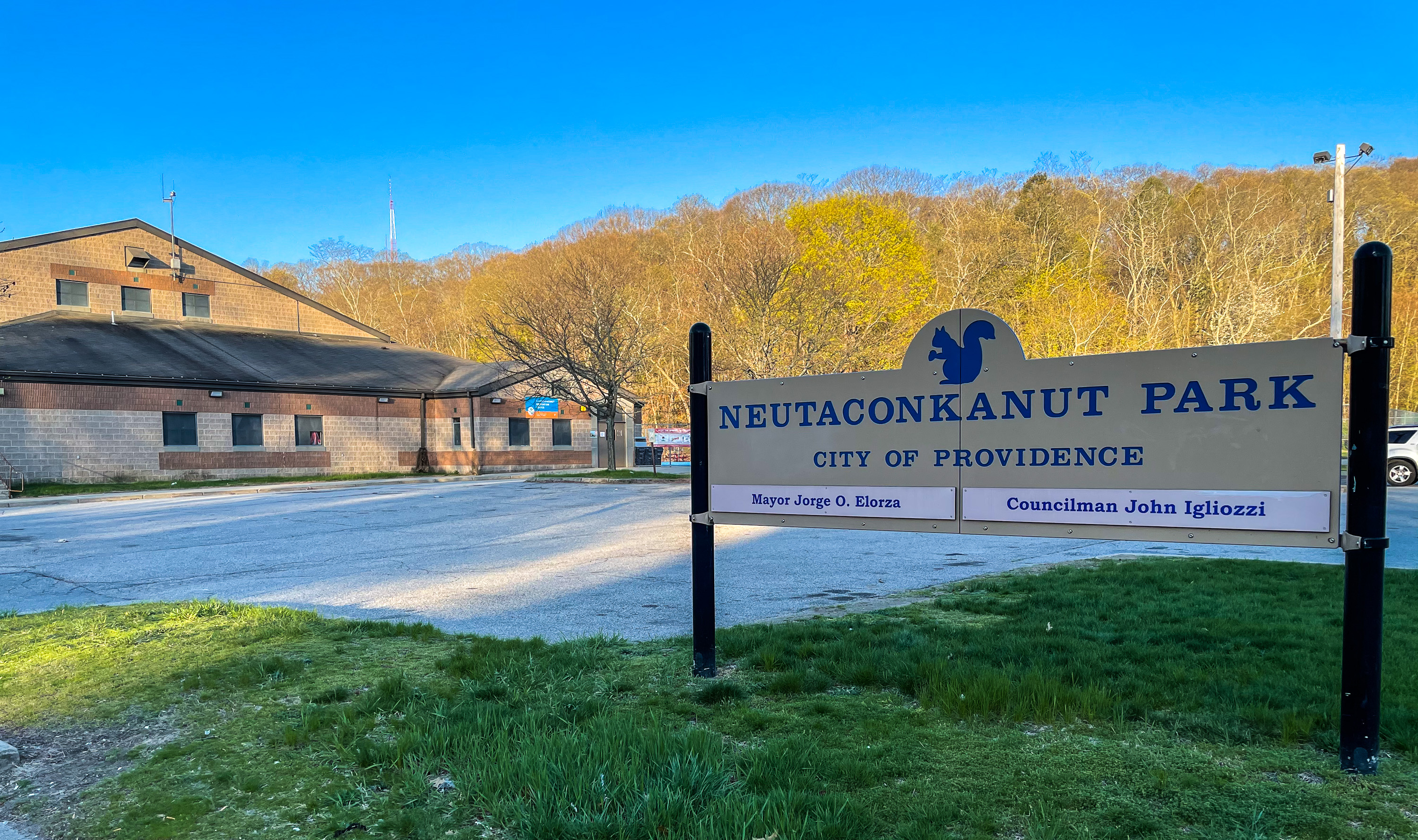
Park sign

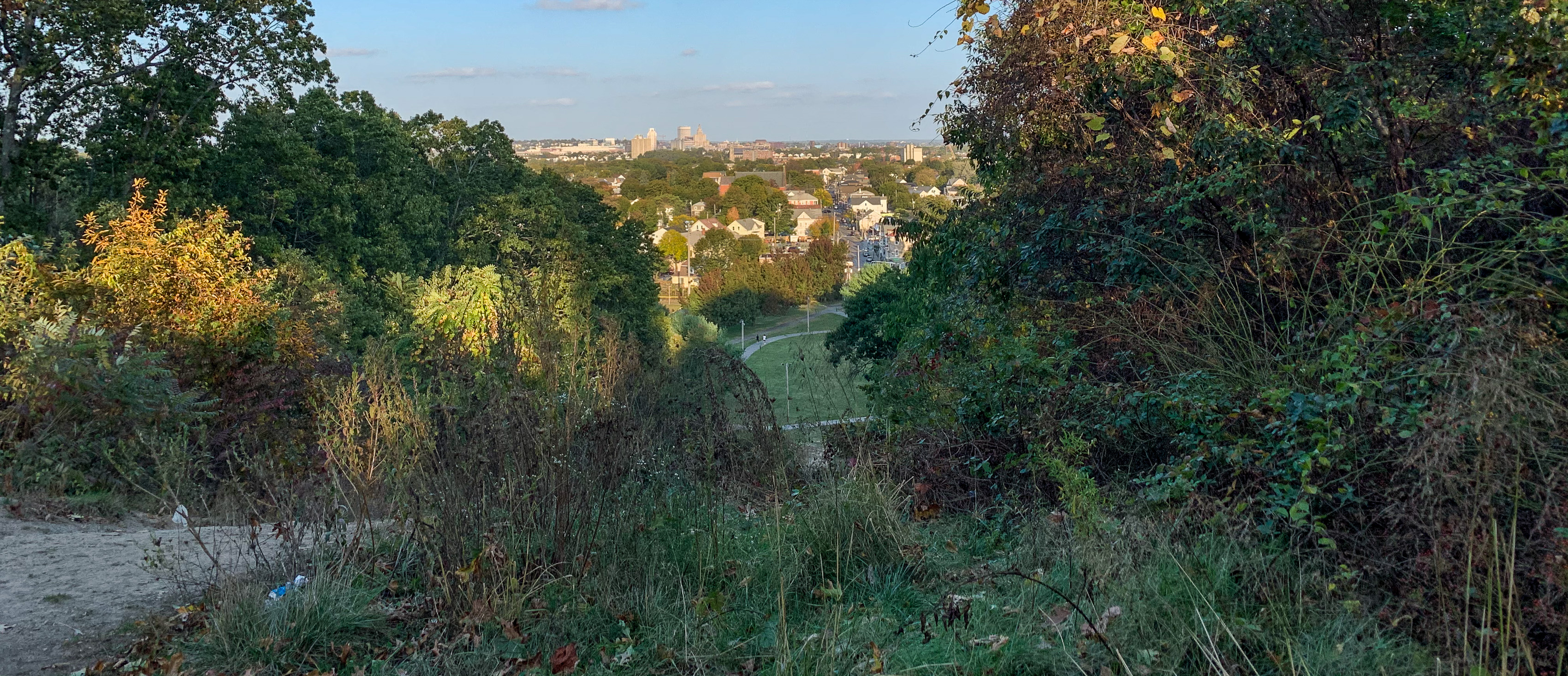
Looking toward Providence from Neutaconkanut Hill

Neutaconkanut Park (NEW-tah-kon-kuh-nut or NEW-tah-kon-uh-kut) occupies most of Silver Lake between Plainfield Street and the border with Johnston. It is a 73-acre (300,000 m^{2}) park with baseball fields, basketball courts, public pool and recreation center as well as forest and walking trails.

Within the park lies Neutaconkanut Hill, the highest point in the city at 296 feet. The hill was Providence's original northwest boundary, by agreement between Roger Williams and Narragansett sachems Canonicus and Miantonomi. A huge glacial erratic boulder once stood on the hill, which was believed to have served as a lookout point for Canonicus. The boulder was broken apart, as nearby residents feared that the boulder might roll off the hill upon them. Author Henry David Thoreau wrote in his journal about climbing Neutaconkanut Hill, during a visit to Providence in 1854.

=== Other parks ===
There are four small memorial parks near the intersection of Silver Lake and Pocasset Avenue. They are:

- Ponte Corvo Memorial at the corner of Pocasset Avenue and Laurel Hill Avenue.
- Cerbo Square Memorial on Murray Street near the intersection of Murray and Silver Lake Avenue.
- Scalabrini Piazza on Silver Lake Avenue at the site of the bell tower left standing at the original St Bartholomew's Church (now located 1/3 mile away, atop Laurel Hill).
- Silver Lake Memorial Park is a small war memorial at the corner of Pocasset Avenue and Union Avenue.

== Cultural attractions ==
Silver Lake features the Feast of Saint Bartholomew, a church feast which includes a solemn procession, games, rides, and foods from both Italian-American and Hispanic cuisines respectively. The feast lasts three days and is held every year in August.

In 1907, the original Saint Bartholomew Church (then located on Moorefield Street) was dedicated. The church was built by the Italian immigrants in the neighborhood, who in large part had lived in Vairano Patenora, Caserta, Campania in Southern Italy before settling in Silver Lake. The Church is named in honor of La Parrochia di San Bartolomeo (Saint Bartholomew Parish) located in Vairano Patenora. Throughout the years, the size of the parish increased greatly so in 1969, a new and larger Church was built next to the Parish School on Laurel Hill Avenue.

== Notable people ==
- Joseph A. Bevilacqua Sr. (1918 – 1989), Chief Justice of the Rhode Island Supreme Court 1976–1986
- Philip "Sharky" Almagno (1927–2018) two-term Councilman for the city of Providence's 7th ward

== See also ==
- Neighborhoods in Providence, Rhode Island
