= Mashapaug Pond =

Pond in Providence, Rhode Island, United States

- Location within Rhode Island Location within the United States
- Location: Rhode Island, United States
- Coordinates: 41°47′40″N 71°26′01″W
- Surface area: 114 acres (46 ha)
- Settlements: Providence

Mashapaug Pond is the largest freshwater pond in the city of Providence, Rhode Island.

Over the past four hundred years, Mashapaug Pond has been a site of indigenous settlement and displacement, deforestation and agriculture, urban and industrial development, remediation and activism. The pond was a significant site to Indigenous people for centuries before and after 1636, when the Europeans settled in Rhode Island. After King Philip's War a large number of the Narragansett people were either killed or driven out of the region. One of the small surviving communities happened to be the native community at Mashapaug, which transformed into the West Elmwood neighborhood.

Over the next couple of centuries, the West Elmwood neighborhood became the city's first racially integrated neighborhood. In the 1960s, the redevelopment agency of Providence partook in the nation's claimed that areas around Mashapaug Pond, including the West Elmwood neighborhood, was blighted and substandard. As a result, the West Elmwood neighborhood was eliminated and the area surrounding Mashapaug Pond was renamed the Reservoir neighborhood.

During the 19th century, the Gorham Manufacturing Company built its 37-acre plant on the shore of the pond. From 1890–1967 Gorham played a vital role in the development of the city of Providence and of the American decorative arts but also poisoned Mashapaug Pond.

Today, due to surface water run-off and industrial discharges, Mashapaug Pond is extremely toxic. The former Gorham location, which includes the pond's cove, are contaminated with toxic metals, solvents and combustion waste products. In an effort to raise awareness about the pond and its condition, a nonprofit called the Urban Pond Procession (now UPP Arts) was established. UPP Arts used the arts and the humanities to advocate for environmental issues in Rhode Island and particularly in Mashapaug Pond.

== Geography ==
Mashapaug Pond is located in Southwest Providence, Rhode Island, and is a part of the Pawtuxet River Watershed. Tongue Pond and Spectacle Pond drain into Mashapaug Pond, which drains into Roger Williams Park Pond and eventually the Narragansett Bay.

== History ==
=== Indigenous People and European Settlement ===
The first residents of the Reservoir Neighborhood were Narragansett Indians who had a village on the shores of Mashapaug Pond, most likely near the northwest side of the pond. In 1636, Roger Williams and a number of early settlers left Salem, Massachusetts and settled on Narragansett Bay. When traveling across the Seekonk River, Williams encountered a group of Narragansett Indians. The Narragansett Indians housed Williams and his followers for the winter until Williams negotiated a deal for the land that would become Providence with the Narragansett Sachems Cononicus and Miantonomo. In return, Williams allowed the Sachems to take whatever English goods they wanted.

In 1680, shortly after King Philip's War, the first European settlement developed around the northern sections of Mashapaug Pond. During the late seventeenth century, John Salyes established the first and largest farm. The farm, located to the northeast of the Pond, extended into the area that is now Elmwood Avenue and Broad Street.

=== Gorham Silver Company ===
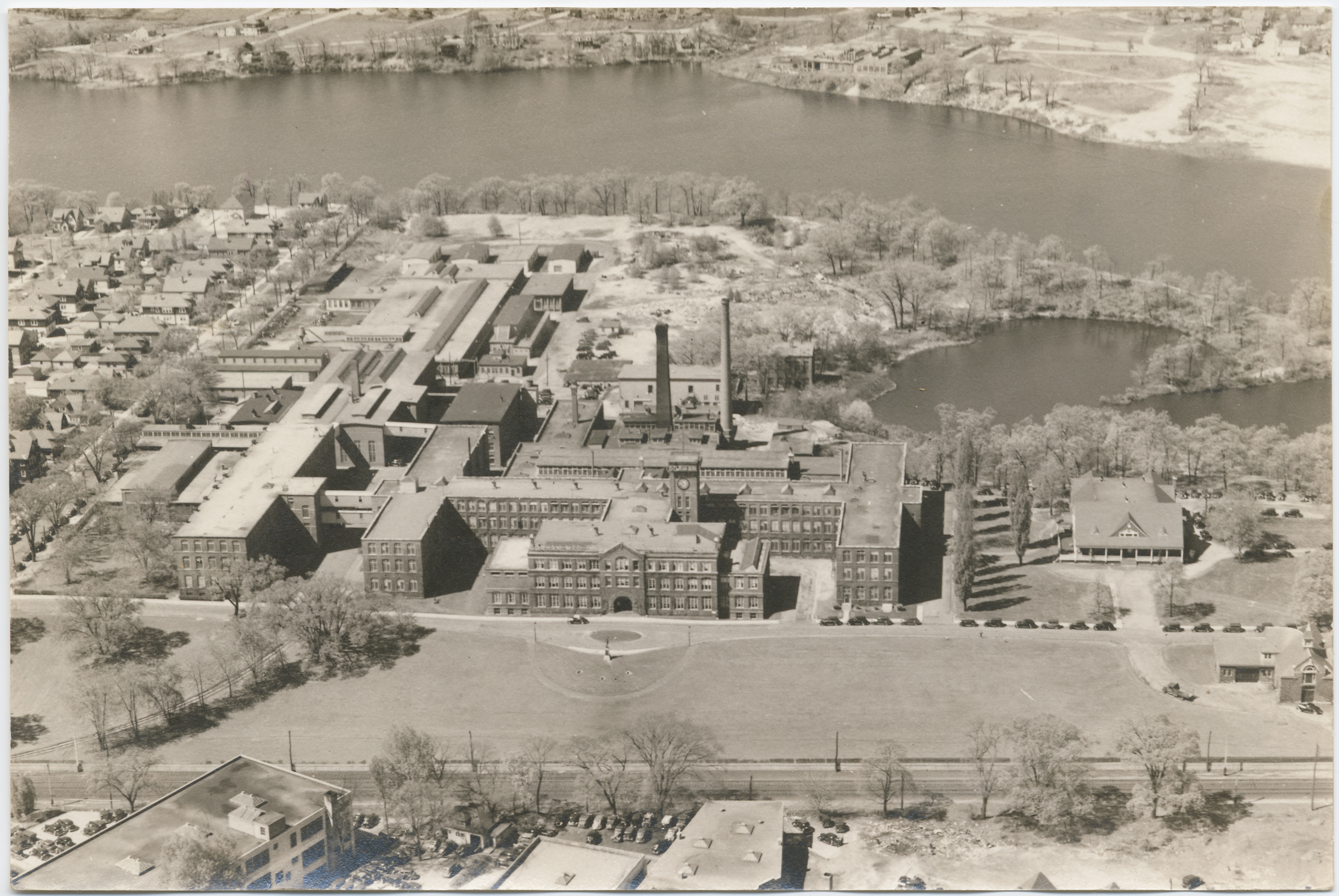
Gorham Manufacturing Company complex on Mashapaug Pond

Providence was one of the cities at the heart of the American Industrial Revolution, in both its first and second instances. During the second industrial revolution, in 1890, Gorham Silver Manufacturing Company chose a site on the shores of Mashapaug Pond. Gorham began as one of the leading manufacturers of silverware in the U.S., but after the Great Depression and World War II, the company shifted to producing war-related silver products such as weapons. Samples of the pond's soil indicate that Gorham Silver Manufacturing, along with other metal manufacturing companies on the pond's shores, left massive amounts of metal sediment in and around the pond. High levels of heavy metals, VOCs, PAHs, and dioxin are found in the sediment of Mashapaug Cove.

=== West Elmwood Neighborhood ===
The shore of Mashapaug Pond between Niantic and Huntington Avenue served as a home to the West Elmwood neighborhood, one of the first racially integrated neighborhoods in America. West Elmwood was home to approximately 500 families, offering them an intimate, secluded community, but with the bordering highways still providing access to the larger world. As issues of racial integration became more important in the United States in the 1960s, similar interactions were occurring on a local, neighborhood level in West Elmwood. Some former residents of the neighborhood recall all races in West Elmwood coming together as a large family, looking after each other's kids and calling everyone by name. The neighborhood is fondly remembered as being beautiful, with constant views and access to the pond and endless rows of fruit trees lining the roads.

=== Urban renewal ===
In the 1960s, "urban renewal projects" were being implemented across the country to knock down old neighborhoods, including West Elmwood, in favor of highways and industrial infrastructure. In 1961, Huntington Industrial Park was built on top of the West Elmwood neighborhood, right on the shores of Mashapaug Pond.

=== Urban Pond Procession ===
Founded in 2008 the Urban Pond Procession (now UPP Arts but originally named Mashapaug Pond Procession, 2008–2009), is a nonprofit that engaged artists and communities in public art-making for the purpose of celebrating and building stewardship of our shared environment.

In 2014, UPP Arts, spearheaded by its founder Holly Ewald, partnered with the Providence Planning Department to plant a small orchard of fruit trees in a park in the West Elmwood neighborhood as the first initiative to recognize and remember the history of the important and lively neighborhood.

== Environmental issues ==
Mashapaug Pond has suffered from a long history of pollution. Majority of the ponds toxicity is due to high pollutant concentrations in the pond's soil and water produced by industrial activities occurring around the pond's shores. Less impactful industrial activities include deforestation and soil tilling for agriculture in the 18th century, Earl Carpenter Icehouse that harvested ice from the pond from 1814–1920, and the construction of Route 10 and the Huntington Industrial Park between 1960 and 1970. Today, the Gorham Manufacturing Company is highly responsible for a significant amount of pollution in the water, soil and air in and around the pond. During the 19th century and majority of the 20th century, there were few regulations and restrictions on the companies' use of potentially toxic materials. Gorham frequently used cleaners that contained polychlorinated biphenyls (PCBs), solvents, heavy metals such as lead, and other pollutants. Over time, these contaminants leached into the pond's soil and water.

In 1970 the Environmental Protection Agency (EPA), set restrictions around industrial dumping and provided ways to force polluters to clean up toxic areas. In 1972, the federal government passed the Clean Water Act in order to set water quality standards and outlaw the dumping of industrial waste into waterways directly. Shortly after the passing of the Clean Water Act, Textron—the company the bought Gorham in 1972—and the Rhode Island Department of Environmental Management funded the effort to make Mashapaug Pond and its surrounding areas a safe site for human use.

In the early 2000s, after Gorham closed, lawmakers suggested the now-vacant area be used as a site for a new high school. At first the community residents of Mashapaug protested due to the fact that the area was still highly toxic, but public opposition declined after Textron remediated the land and the school promised to include an air filtration system. The Dr. Jorge Alvarez High School opened in 2006.

Since its opening, Alvarez High School has spearheaded a magnitude of environmental recuperation efforts in collaboration with the Urban Pond Procession. Student art and scientific research has been used to educate the surrounding community and the greater Providence area about the history of Mashapaug Pond.
