= Olneyville, Providence, Rhode Island =

Olneyville
- Neighborhood of Providence
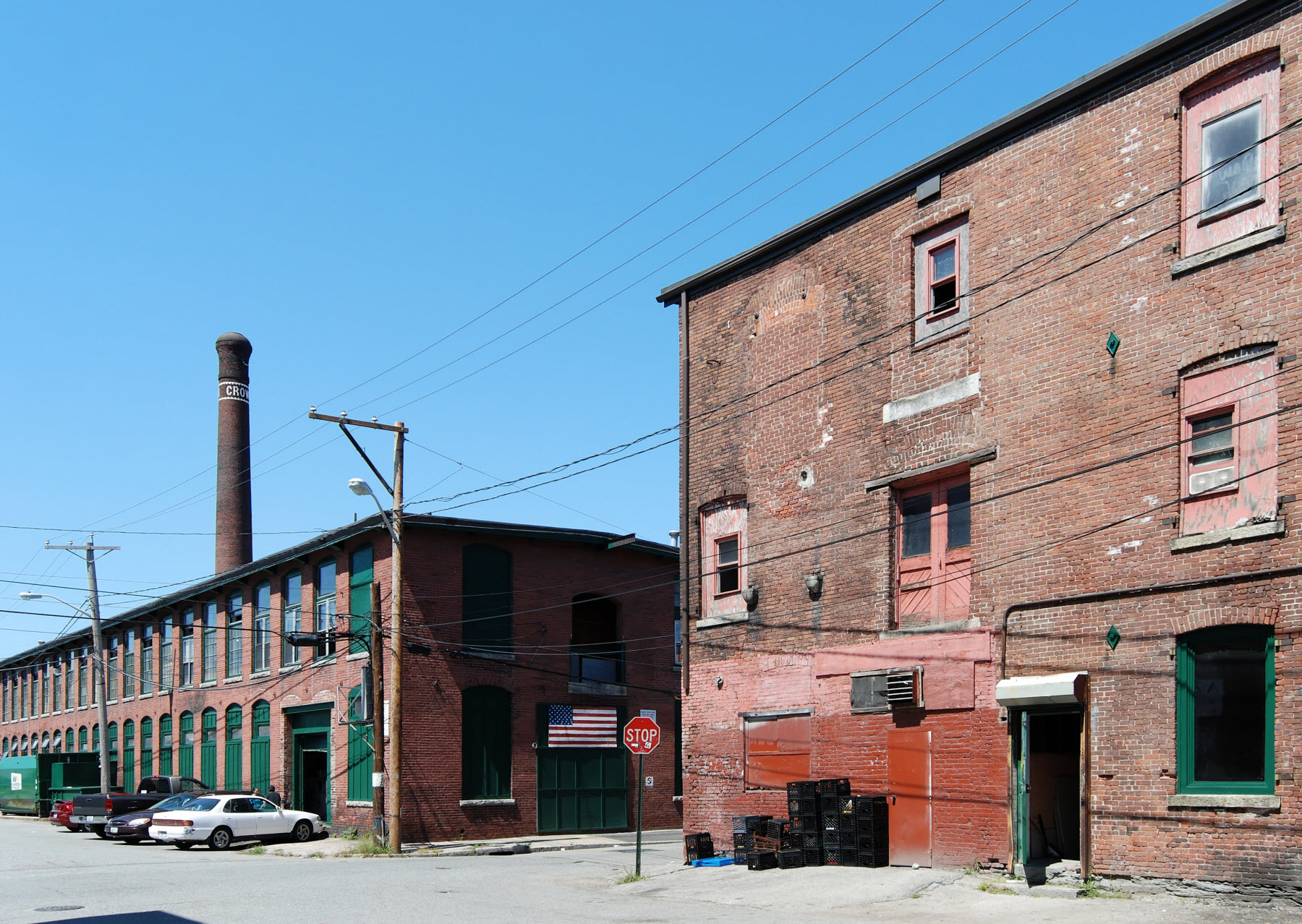
- The Weybosset Mills Complex

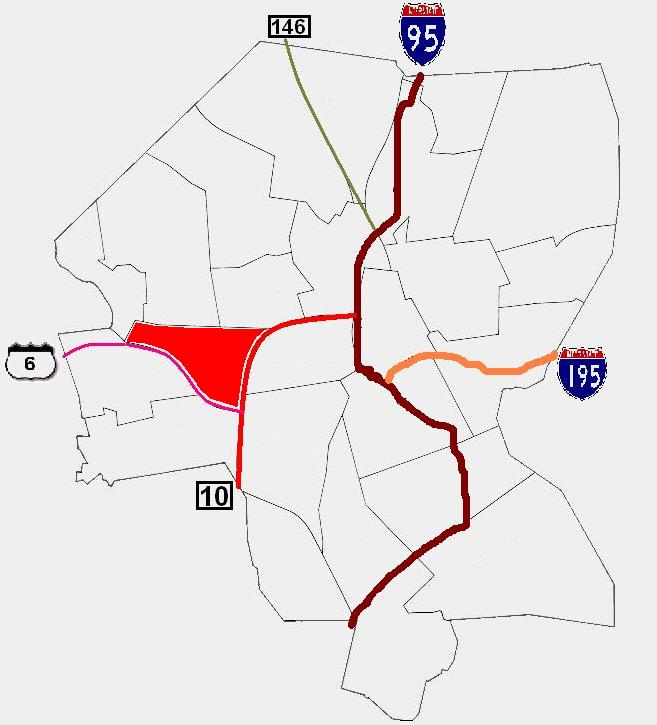
- Location of Olneyville within Providence
- Coordinates: 41.821424°N 71.445977°W
- Country: United States
- State: Rhode Island
- City: Providence

Olneyville is a neighborhood in Providence, Rhode Island bordered by Atwells Avenue to the north, U.S. Route 6 to the south and Rhode Island Route 10 to the east. The Woonasquatucket River runs through the southern portion of the neighborhood. The area is roughly triangular.

Olneyville Square is a major traffic intersection in Olneyville, defined by the intersection of Westminster Street, Broadway, Hartford Ave, Plainfield Street, and Manton Avenue.

== History ==
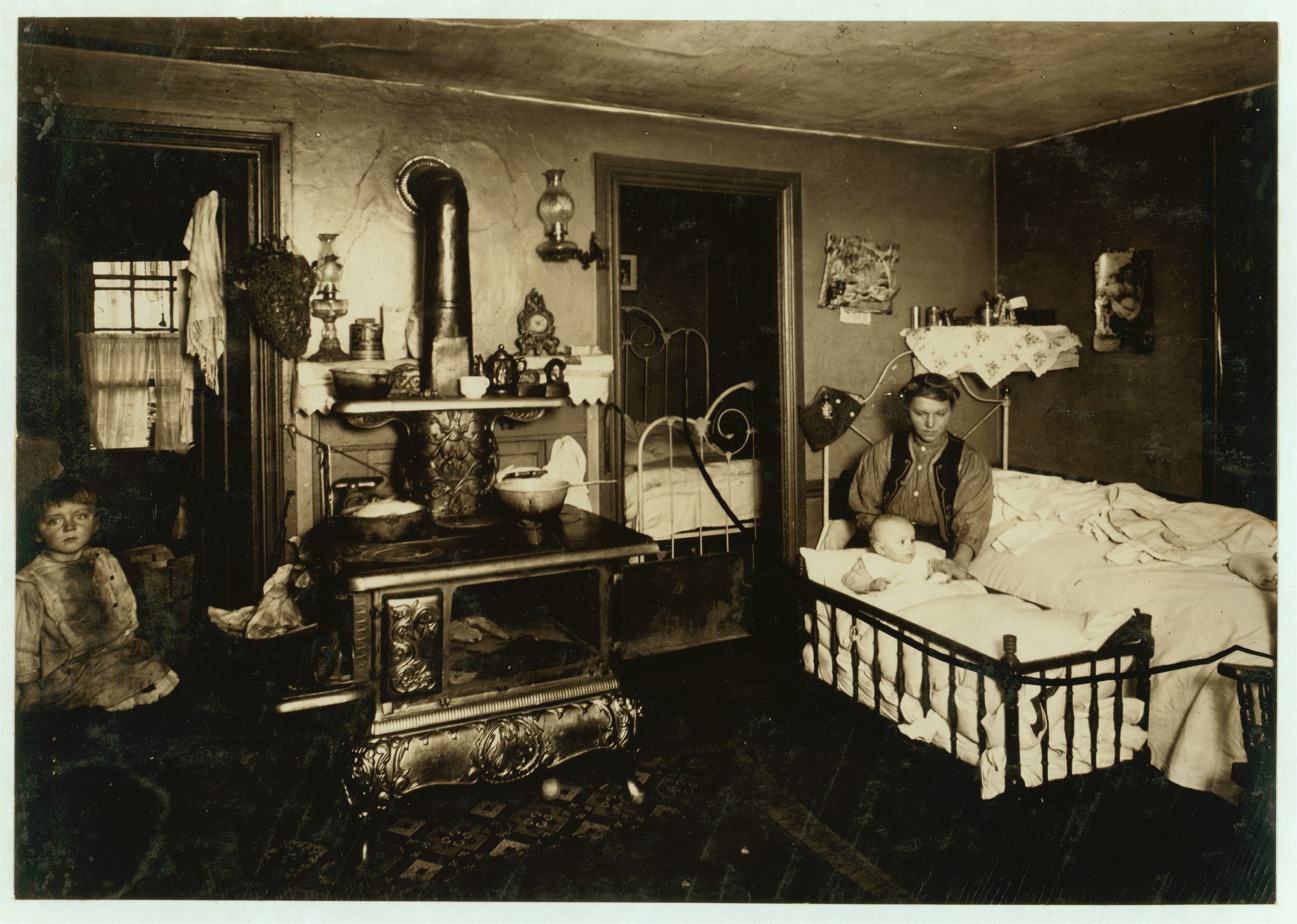
Cotton mill workers in a home in Olneyville, 1912

Roger Williams founded Providence Plantations, which became part of the Colony of Rhode Island. Settlement in Olneyville began at Olneyville Square in the early 18th century as a center of trade with a nearby Narragansett village. The settlement grew significantly around 1785, after Christopher Olney founded a grist mill and a paper mill on a wide part of the Woonasquatucket River. Olney was a captain during the American Revolutionary War and owned a 95-acre farm in the area. By the end of the war, a forge and foundry and other small industries operated in Olneyville.

Through the mid-19th century, Olneyville developed as a railroad junction and a mill district, with much available employment. This helped attract many immigrants. However, the mill industries declined after World War II, causing economic decline. The construction of the Route 6 - Route 10 connector in the 1950s exacerbated these problems by separating Olneyville and other neighborhoods from the rest of the city. In the two decades that followed, Olneyville witnessed a substantial drop in its population.

== Redevelopment ==
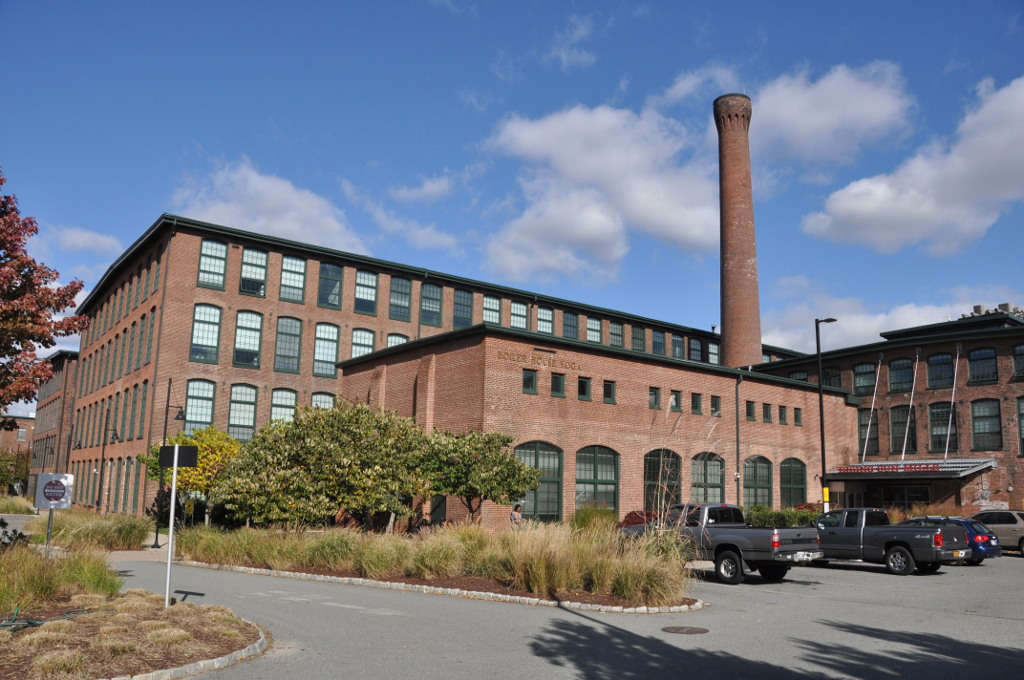
National and Providence Worsted Mills

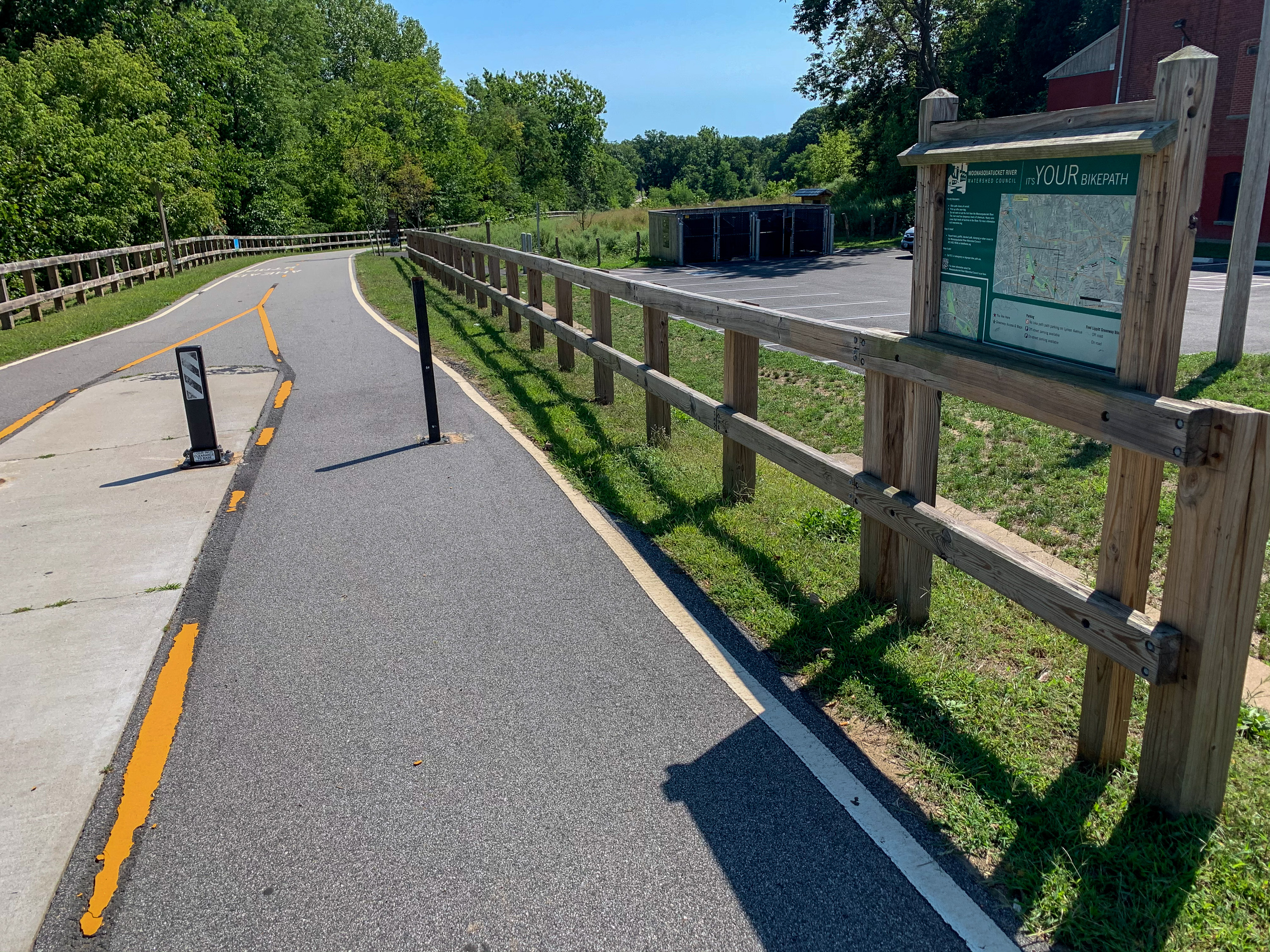
Woonasquatucket River Greenway

Former warehouses and mill buildings in Olneyville were home to a number of artist collectives. Since 2000, many vacant lots and abandoned buildings have been purchased by developers who hope to rejuvenate the area.

However, proposals to redevelop the Olneyville area have met some local opposition, caused by fears of gentrification. In March 2007, the Olneyville Neighborhood Association (ONA) declared its opposition to plans from the United Way to move their headquarters from the East Side to 50 Valley Street in Olneyville. In July 2007, during a meeting of the Providence City Council, the ONA declared a "tax strike" to protest a proposed property tax increase. Residents of Olneyville and Silver Lake expressed concerns that the proposed tax increase would force poorer residents from their homes and declared that they would not pay the amount of any property tax increase.

== Demographics ==
Olneyville's population, 6,495 in the 2000 US Census, is very diverse. As of the 2010 US Census, the racial and ethnic breakdown of Olneyville was 61% Hispanic; 16% White; 13% Black or African American; 4% Asian; 6% Other.

63% of public school children speak a language other than English as their primary language.

The housing stock is 18% owner-occupied and 12% single-family housing units, compared with 35% and 26%, respectively, for Providence overall (US Census 2000)

The median family income is $19,046, well below the citywide average of $32,058. 41.1% of families live in poverty while nearly one in four families receives some form of public assistance.

Rates of lead poisoning 14% of children younger than age 6 had elevated blood lead levels, some of the highest in Providence (2004–2008 RI Department of Health, KIDSNET data).

Of Olneyville's households, 41% report not owning a car (US Census 2000)

Only 3% of total births were less than 2500 g, one of the best rates in Providence (2007 RI Department of Health, KIDSNET data).

Of total births, 88% from 2006 to 2008 were to mothers with public insurance, which is one of the highest rates in Providence (1997–2008 RI Department of Health, KIDSNET data).

== Government ==
Olneyville is divided west to east between Ward 6 and Ward 15. They are represented in the Providence City Council by Democrats Sabina Matos and Council President Pro Tempore.

== Arts and culture ==
Olneyville is a number of art galleries and artists' studios, including Yellow Peril and GRIN, both of which are contemporary art galleries at The Plant, 60 Valley Street, as well as performance venues like Fete Music Hall and The Dirt Palace.

The Wilbury Theatre Group moved to its new space in Olneyville in the summer of 2017, where they perform a season of new and established plays.

The Manton Avenue Project, a play writing program for young people, has been based in Olneyville since 2004.

== Parks ==
Olneyville has three parks, connected by the Woonasquatucket River Greenway and Bike Path. The three parks are: John Donigian Memorial Park on Valley Street, Riverside Park on Aleppo Street, and Joslin Park & Recreational area, on Florence Street.

Olneyville also has at least three community gardens and one school garden. Locals plan to organize a regular, seasonal farmer's market, as well.

== Sports ==
Messer Street Grounds was home to the Providence Grays baseball team of the National League from 1878 to 1885.
